= List of environmental and conservation organizations in the United States =

Environmental and conservation organizations in the United States have been formed to help protect the environment, habitats, flora, and fauna on federally owned land, on private land, within coastal limits, in-state conservation areas, in-state parks and in locally governed municipalities. In addition, some organizations utilize the court system in states and at the federal level to enforce environmental and conservation regulations and laws. Most organizations operate as nonprofits. The revenue of these organizations is used to achieve their goals rather than distributing them as profit or dividends.

In the Environmental history of the United States there have been a multitude of environmental organizations—over 160 private groups are listed below. However the "Group of Ten" (or "Big Green") have been preeminent since the late 20th century: Sierra Club, Audubon, National Wildlife Federation, Environmental Defense Fund, Friends of the Earth, Izaak Walton League, The Wilderness Society, National Parks Conservation Association, Natural Resources Defense Council and Earthjustice.

After a nonprofit environmental and conservation organization has been established at the state level, it typically applies for tax exempt status with U.S. federal income tax. Failure to maintain operations in conformity to the laws may result in an organization losing its tax exempt status. Individual states and localities offer nonprofits exemptions from other taxes such as sales tax or property tax. An environmental and conservation organization that is tax exempt is required to file annual financial reports (IRS Form 990). These tax forms are required to be made available to the public.

== Government agencies ==
- United States Department of the Interior
- United States Forest Service
- Environmental Protection Agency
- Fish and Wildlife Service
- National Park Service

== Native American Nations ==
- Akwesasne Task Force on the Environment
- Eyak Preservation Council
- Indigenous Environmental Network
- Inter-Tribal Environmental Council
- InterTribal Sinkyone Wilderness Council

== Regional ==
=== California ===
- 350 Bay Area
- Ballona Wetlands
- California Trout (CalTrout)
- California Academy of Sciences
- Californians Against Waste
- Californians for Population Stabilization
- Carbon180
- Earth Island Institute
- Environment California
- Friends of Five Creeks
- Golden State Salmon Association
- Heal the Bay
- Klamath Forest Alliance
- Lindsay Wildlife Experience
- Marine Mammal Center, The
- Oakland Zoo
- One World One Ocean
- Pacific Environment
- People's Climate Movement
- Point Blue Conservation Science
- Rainforest Action Network
- Santa Lucia Conservancy
- Save the Bay
- Save the Redwoods League
- Silicon Valley Toxics Coalition
- Surfrider Foundation
- TreePeople
- Trust for Public Land
- Urban Bird Foundation
- Ventana Wildlife Society
- Watershed Project, the
- Wild Farm Alliance

=== Pacific (Alaska, Washington, Oregon, Hawaii) ===
- Alaska Conservation Foundation (Alaska)
- Alaska Conservation Society (Alaska)
- Alaska Sealife Center (Alaska)
- Alaska Wildlife Alliance (Alaska)
- BARK (Oregon)
- Capitol Land Trust (Washington)
- Oregon Wild (Oregon)
- Southeast Alaska Conservation Council (SEACC) (Alaska)
- Stand.earth (Washington)

=== Mountain Region (Montana, Idaho, Wyoming, Colorado, Nevada, Utah, Arizona, New Mexico) ===
- American Prairie Foundation (Montana)
- Boone and Crockett Club (Montana)
- Global Water Policy Project (New Mexico)
- Greater Yellowstone Coalition (Wyoming)
- Idaho Conservation League (Idaho)
- Montana Land Reliance (Montana)
- Mission: Wolf (Colorado)
- RuckusRoots (Colorado)
- Southern Utah Wilderness Alliance (Utah)
- Utah Open Lands Conservation Association (Utah)
- Utah Native Plant Society (Utah)
- Utah Open Lands Conservation Association (Utah)
- WILD Foundation (Colorado)
- Wild Montana (Montana)
- Wyoming Outdoor Council (Wyoming)
- Wyoming Wilderness Association (Wyoming)

=== Midwest (North Dakota, South Dakota, Iowa, Nebraska, Minnesota, Wisconsin, Michigan, Illinois, Indiana, Ohio, Kansas, Missouri) ===
- Chicago Wilderness Alliance (Illinois)
- ConservAmerica (Illinois)
- Greening of Detroit (Michigan)
- Honor the Earth (Minnesota)
- Indiana Forest Alliance (Indiana)
- Iowa Natural Heritage Foundation (Iowa)
- Izaak Walton League (Illinois)
- Keep Indianapolis Beautiful (Indiana)
- McHenry County Conservation District (MCCD) (Illinois)
- Neighbors for Environmental Justice (N4EJ) (Illinois)
- Ohio Citizen Action (Ohio)
- Prairie Rivers Network (Illinois)
- Sand County Foundation (Wisconsin)
- Save the Dunes (Indiana)
- Shirley Heinze Land Trust (Indiana)
- Sycamore Land Trust (Indiana)
- United Plant Savers (Ohio)
- Urban Rivers (Illinois)
- The Wildlife Society (Missouri)

=== South (Texas, Oklahoma, Arkansas, Louisiana, Mississippi, Alabama, Tennessee, Kentucky, West Virginia, Virginia, Maryland, Delaware, North Carolina, South Carolina, Georgia, Florida) ===
- Appalachian Voices (North Carolina, Virginia, Tennessee)
- Arlington Coalition on Transportation (ACT) (Virginia)
- Alliance for the Chesapeake Bay (Virginia)
- Center for Environmental Philosophy (Texas)
- Coastal Conservation Association (Florida)
- Coastal Prairie Conservancy (Texas)
- Conserving Carolina (North Carolina)
- Dogwood Alliance (North Carolina)
- Elephant Sanctuary in Tennessee, The (Tennessee)
- Institute for Energy and Environmental Research (IEER) (Maryland)
- International Council on Nanotechnology (ICON) (Texas)
- Karen Beasley Sea Turtle Center (North Carolina)
- Office of Kentucky Nature Preserves (Kentucky)
- Oklahoma Native Plant Society (Oklahoma)
- Southern Environmental Law Center (Alabama, Georgia, North Carolina, South Carolina, Tennessee, Virginia)
- Tennessee Native Plant Society (Tennessee)
- Texas Campaign for the Environment (Texas)
- Torreya Guardians (Georgia)
- Tri-State Bird Research and Rescue (Delaware)

=== North East (Pennsylvania, New York, Vermont, New Hampshire, Maine, Massachusetts, Rhode Island, Connecticut, New Jersey) ===
- Adirondack Mountain Club (New York)
- Allegheny Land Trust (Pennsylvania)
- Aytzim (New York)
- Big Green Bus, The (New Hampshire)
- Brunswick-Topsham Land Trust (Maine)
- Cape Ann Vernal Pond Team (Massachusetts)
- Ceres (Massachusetts)
- Chebeague & Cumberland Land Trust (Maine)
- Citizens Campaign for the Environment (New York, Connecticut)
- Conservation Law Foundation (Maine, Massachusetts, New Hampshire, Rhode Island, Vermont)
- Hudson River Sloop Clearwater (New York)
- Maine Island Trail Association (Maine)
- Maine Land Trust Network (Maine)
- Natural Resources Council of Maine (Maine)
- New York–New Jersey Trail Conference (New York, New Jersey)
- Ocean Alliance (Massachusetts)
- Riverkeeper (New York)
- Royal River Conservation Trust (Maine)
- Scenic Hudson (New York)
- School for Field Studies, The (Massachusetts)
- Student Conservation Association (New Hampshire)
- Waterkeeper Alliance (New York)
- West Harlem Environmental Action (WEACT) (New York)
- Whippany River Watershed Action Committee (WRWAC) (New Jersey)
- Wild Center, The (New York)
- Wildlife Conservation Society (New York)

== Nationwide/multiple regions ==
- 5 Gyres
- African American Environmentalist Association
- Alliance for Climate Protection — see Climate Reality Project
- Alliance to Save Energy
- American Bird Conservancy
- American Chestnut Foundation
- American Farmland Trust
- American Forests
- American Rivers
- Arbor Day Foundation
- Audubon movement
- Bat Conservation International
- Center for Biological Diversity
- Center for Food Safety
- Center for International Environmental Law
- Chesapeake Bay Foundation
- Citizens' Climate Lobby
- Clean Water Action
- Climate Reality Project
- Climate Mobilization
- Conservation Fund
- Conservation International
- Cool Effect
- Defenders of Wildlife
- Ducks Unlimited
- Earth's Birthday Project
- Earth First!
- Earthjustice
- Earth Liberation Army (ELA)
- Earth Liberation Front (ELF)
- Earth Policy Institute
- Ecotrust
- Endangered Planet Foundation
- Engineers for a Sustainable World
- Environment America
- Environmental and Energy Study Institute (EESI)
- Environmental Defense Fund
- Environmental Design Research Association (EDRA)
- Environmental Integrity Project (EIP)
- Environmental Law Institute
- Environmental Working Group
- Franciscan Action Network
- GivePower
- Greenguard Environmental Institute
- Greenpeace USA
- Institute of Environmental Sciences and Technology
- International Bird Rescue
- Island Conservation
- Keep America Beautiful
- League of Conservation Voters
- National Audubon Society
- National Council for Science and the Environment (NCSE)
- National Geographic Society
- National Parks Conservation Association (NPCA)
- National Wildlife Federation
- National Wildlife Refuge Association
- Natural Resources Defense Council
- Nature Conservancy
- NatureServe
- Negative Population Growth
- New Dream
- Oceana (non-profit group)
- Ocean Conservancy
- Ocean Foundation
- One Planet One Future
- The Peregrine Fund
- Pheasants Forever
- Population Action International
- Population Connection
- Population Council
- Population Media Center
- Population Reference Bureau
- Power Shift Network
- Public Employees for Environmental Responsibility
- Rising Tide North America
- Rocky Mountain Elk Foundation
- Sand County Foundation
- Sea Shepherd Conservation Society
- Sierra Club
- Sierra Student Coalition
- Society for the Study of Amphibians and Reptiles
- Student Environmental Action Coalition (SEAC)
- Trout Unlimited
- Union of Concerned Scientists
- Wild Salmon Center
- Wilderness Society (United States)
- WildEarth Guardians
- Wildlife Conservation Network
- Worldwatch Institute
- World Wildlife Fund

== See also ==
- Environmental history of the United States
- List of conservation organisations
- List of environmental agencies in the United States
- List of environmental organizations
- List of environmental organizations in the Sacramento region of California
- List of green political parties
- List of population concern organizations
- List of renewable energy organizations
- Nonprofit organization
