= EPF =

EPF may refer to:

== Computing and gaming ==
- .epf, a file extension for CadSoft Eagle project files
- Eclipse process framework, an open source project
- Club Penguin: Elite Penguin Force, a game released for the Nintendo DS

== Government programs ==
- Employees Provident Fund
- Established Programs Financing, a former transfer program to the provinces managed by the Government of Canada.
- European Parliamentary Forum
- European Peace Facility, a financing instrument of the EU Common Foreign and Security Policy

== Military and police ==
- Eritrean Police Force
- Expeditionary fast transport (EPF), a US Navy hull classification symbol

== Non-government organizations ==
- Endangered Planet Foundation, an American conservation organization
- Ensuring Positive Futures, a British employment program
- Episcopal Peace Fellowship, an American peace organization

== Other ==
- Early pregnancy factor
- Electricity price forecasting
- EPF Engineering School, a French engineering college
- European Polymer Federation
- European Pickleball Federation
