= Maine Land Trust Network =

- Abbreviation: MLTN
- Founded: 1995 (31 years ago)
- Type: Nonprofit
- Headquarters: Maine
- Location: U.S.
- Region served: Maine
- Services: Conservation
- Website: https://www.mltn.org/

The Maine Land Trust Network (MLTN) promotes discussion among the eighty land trusts in Maine, United States. It was established in 1995.

As of 2023, MLTN members have conserved over 2,685,000 acres (1,087,000 ha) of land, maintain over 2,500 miles (4,000 km) of hiking trails, and provide over 340 water access points. MLTN members protect 61% of the state's land area.

Its conservation partner is the Maine Coast Heritage Trust, of which it is a program. It is run by a steering committee composed of members of some of its constituent trusts.

According to Kate Stookey, president and chief executive officer of Maine Coast Heritage Trust, "MLTN facilitates collaboration and builds capacity for Maine’s land conservation movement statewide."

== Land trusts ==
There is at least one trust in each of the state's sixteen counties.

By county:

=== Androscoggin County ===
- Androscoggin Land Trust
- Land in Common
- Royal River Conservation Trust

=== Aroostook County ===
- Land in Common
- Upper St. John River Organization
- Upper St. John Land Trust
- Woodie Wheaton Land Trust

=== Cumberland County ===
- Brunswick-Topsham Land Trust
- Cape Elizabeth Land Trust
- Chebeague & Cumberland Land Trust
- Eastern Trail Alliance
- Falmouth Land Trust
- Freeport Conservation Trust
- Great Diamond Island Land Preserve
- Harpswell Heritage Land Trust
- Land in Common
- Loon Echo Land Trust
- Maine Island Trail Association
- Oceanside Conservation Trust of Casco Bay
- Peaks Island Land Preserve
- Portland Trails
- Presumpscot Regional Land Trust
- Royal River Conservation Trust
- Scarborough Land Trust
- South Portland Land Trust
- Southern Maine Conservation Collaborative

=== Franklin County ===
- 7 Lakes Alliance
- Androscoggin Land Trust
- Foothills Land Conservancy
- High Peaks Alliance
- Land in Common
- Maine Appalachian Trail Land Trust
- Maine Huts and Trails
- Rangeley Lakes Heritage Trust

=== Hancock County ===
- Blue Hill Heritage Trust
- Crabtree Neck Land Trust
- Frenchman Bay Conservancy
- Great Pond Mountain Conservation Trust
- Island Heritage Trust
- Land in Common
- Maine Island Trail Association

=== Kennebec County ===
- 7 Lakes Alliance
- Kennebec Land Trust
- Land in Common
- Midcoast Conservancy
- Sebasticook Regional Land Trust

=== Knox County ===
- 7 Lakes Alliance
- Kennebec Land Trust
- Land in Common
- Midcoast Conservancy
- Sebasticook Regional Land Trust

=== Lincoln County ===
- Boothbay Region Land Trust
- Chewonki Foundation
- Coastal Rivers Conservation Trust
- Kennebec Estuary Land Trust
- Land in Common
- Maine Island Trail Association
- Midcoast Conservancy

=== Oxford County ===
- Androscoggin Land Trust
- Greater Lovell Land Trust
- High Peaks Alliance
- Land in Common
- Loon Echo Land Trust
- Mahoosuc Land Trust
- Maine Appalachian Trail Land Trust
- Maine Huts and Trails
- Rangeley Lakes Heritage Trust
- Upper Saco Valley Land Trust

=== Penobscot County ===
- Bangor Land Trust
- Brewer Land Trust
- Ecotat Trust
- Holden Land Trust
- Land in Common
- Landmark Heritage Trust
- Orono Land Trust
- Sebasticook Regional Land Trust

=== Piscataquis County ===
- Appalachian Mountain Club – Maine Woods Initiative
- Friends of Wilson Pond Area, Inc.
- Land in Common
- Maine Appalachian Trail Land Trust
- Maine Huts and Trails
- Sebasticook Regional Land Trust

=== Sagadahoc County ===
- Androscoggin Land Trust
- Brunswick-Topsham Land Trust
- Friends of Merrymeeting Bay
- Kennebec Estuary Land Trust
- Land in Common
- Maine Island Trail Association
- Phippsburg Land Trust

=== Somerset County ===
- 7 Lakes Alliance
- High Peaks Alliance
- Land in Common
- Maine Appalachian Trail Land Trust
- Maine Huts and Trails
- Pierce Pond Watershed Trust
- Sebasticook Regional Land Trust
- Somerset Woods Trustees

=== Waldo County ===
- Friends of Sears Island
- Islesboro Islands Trust
- Land in Common
- Maine Island Trail Association
- Midcoast Conservancy
- Sebasticook Regional Land Trust

=== Washington County ===
- Downeast Coastal Conservancy
- Downeast Lakes Land Trust
- Downeast Salmon Federation
- Land in Common
- Maine Island Trail Association
- Pleasant River Wildlife Foundation
- Woodie Wheaton Land Trust

=== York County ===
- Arundel Conservation Trust
- Biddeford Pool Land Trust
- Blandings Park Wildlife Sanctuary
- Eastern Trail Alliance
- Francis Small Heritage Trust, Inc.
- Great Works Regional Land Trust
- Kennebunk Land Trust
- Kennebunkport Conservation Trust
- Kittery Land Trust
- Land in Common
- Mt. Agamenticus to the Sea Conservation Initiative
- Saco Bay Trails
- Saco Valley Land Trust
- Sanford-Springvale Mousam Way Land Trust
- Southern Maine Conservation Collaborative
- Three Rivers Land Trust
- Waterboro Land Trust
- Wells National Estuarine Research Reserve & Laudholm Trust
- York Land Trust, Inc.

Statewide:

- Forest Society of Maine
- Land in Common
- Maine Audubon
- Maine Coast Heritage Trust
- Maine Farmland Trust
- Maine Woodland Owners
- New England Forestry Foundation
- Northeast Wilderness Trust
- The Conservation Fund
- The Nature Conservancy in Maine
- The Trust for Public Land

== See also ==
- List of environmental and conservation organizations in the United States
