= Chesapeake Bay Program =

Organization implementing a plan to remediate ecosystem damage

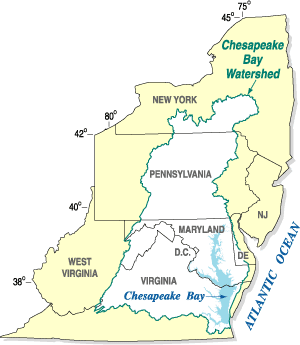
Map of the Chesapeake Bay watershed

The Chesapeake Bay Program is the regional partnership that directs and conducts the restoration of the Chesapeake Bay in the United States. As a partnership, the Chesapeake Bay Program brings together members of various state, federal, academic and local watershed organizations to build and adopt policies that support Chesapeake Bay restoration. By combining the resources and unique strengths of each individual organization, the Chesapeake Bay Program is able to follow a unified plan for restoration. The program office is located in Annapolis, Maryland.

== History ==
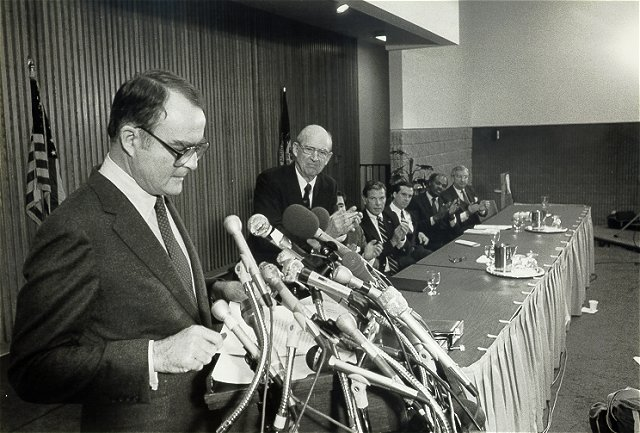
EPA Administrator William Ruckelshaus addressing a Chesapeake Bay Commission conference on December 9, 1983. The 1983 Chesapeake Bay Agreement was signed at the conference.

In the late 1970s and early 1980s, Congress funded scientific and estuarine research of the Chesapeake Bay, which pinpointed three areas that required immediate attention:

- toxic pollution
- nutrient over-enrichment
- dwindling underwater bay grasses.

The Environmental Protection Agency (EPA) released a report in September 1983, based on seven years of research on the bay. The report stated that the bay was an "ecosystem in decline" and cited numerous instances of declines in the populations of oysters, crabs, freshwater fish and other wildlife.

In December 1983 the governors of Maryland, Virginia and Pennsylvania; the mayor of the District of Columbia; and the EPA Administrator signed The Chesapeake Bay Agreement of 1983. From this act, the Chesapeake Bay Program Executive Council was formed.

== Evolution ==
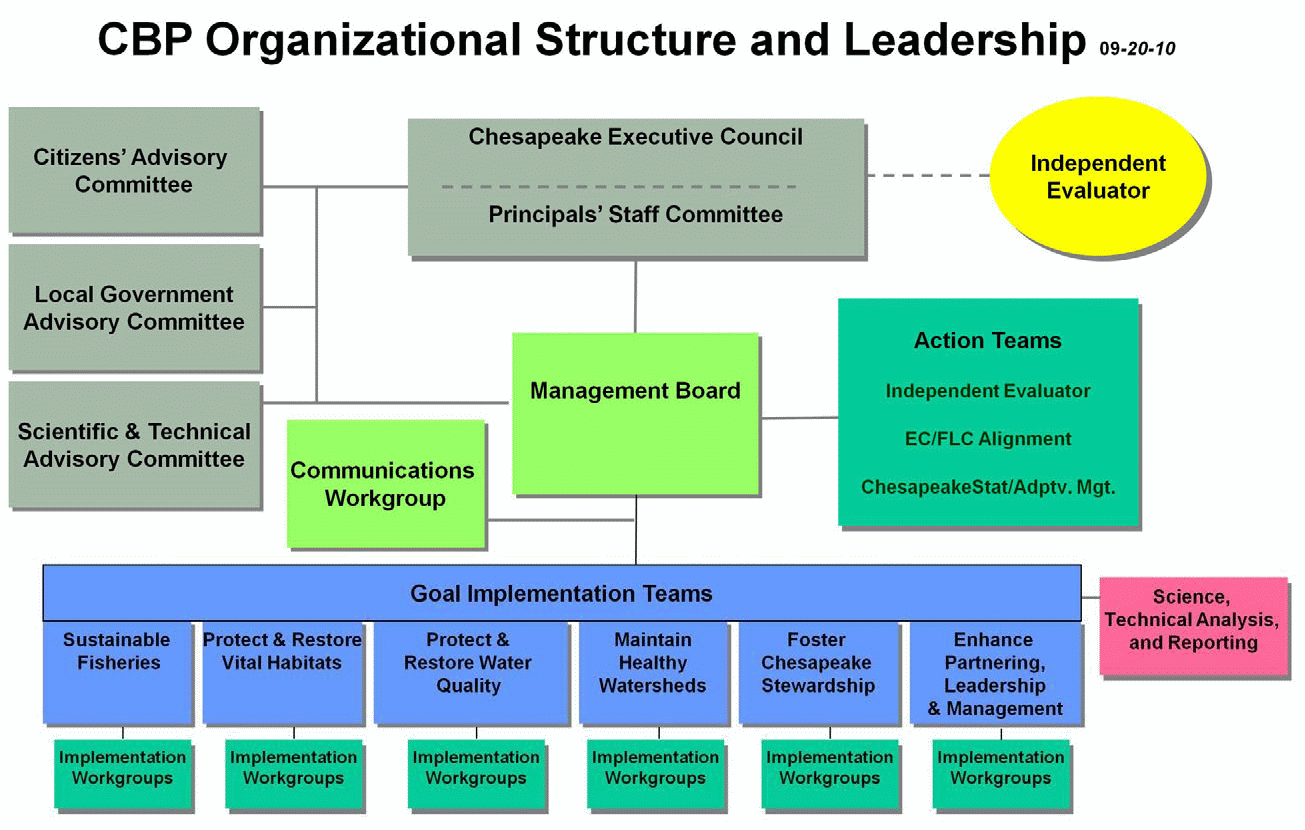
Organization chart of the Chesapeake Bay Program

Since the signing of 1983 agreement, the Chesapeake Bay Program has adopted two additional agreements that provide overall guidance for Chesapeake Bay restoration:

- The 1987 Chesapeake Bay Agreement established the Chesapeake Bay Program's goal to reduce the amount of nutrients—primarily nitrogen and phosphorus—that enter the Chesapeake Bay by 40 percent by 2000. In 1992, the Chesapeake Bay Program partners agreed to continue the 40 percent reduction goal beyond 2000 and to attack nutrients at their source: upstream, in the Chesapeake Bay's tributaries.
- In June 2000, the Chesapeake Bay Program adopted Chesapeake 2000, an agreement intended to guide restoration activities throughout the Chesapeake Bay watershed through 2010. Chesapeake 2000 also provided the opportunity for the adjoining states of Delaware, New York and West Virginia to become more involved in the partnership. These headwater states now work with the Chesapeake Bay Program to reduce nutrients and sediment flowing into rivers from their jurisdictions. The renewed bay agreement was designed to guide restoration activities throughout the bay watershed through 2010. The members pledged to achieve over 100 specific actions all designed to restore the health of the bay. The agreement is organized into five categories, all dedicated to restoration and protection of different areas of the bay's health: living resources, vital habitat, water quality, sound land use, and stewardship and community engagement.
  - The living resource section of the agreement states the goal of "restore, enhance and protect, the finfish, shellfish, and other living resources, their habitats and ecological relationship to sustain all fisheries and provide for a balanced ecosystem." One of the specific goals for this is to help the blue crab population by establishing harvest targets and begin implementing state fisheries management strategies and to manage the blue crab fishery to restore a healthy, size, age structure and biomass. This section also touches on multi-species management, a tenfold increase in the native oyster population, as well as resident and migratory fish passage.
  - The vital habitat protection and restoration section aims to recommit to the existing goal of protecting 114,000 acres (460 km^{2}) of submerged aquatic vegetation which include specific levels of water clarity to be met by 2010. It also touches on wetlands, watershed, and forest preservation and conservation easements.
  - The water quality restoration and protection section states that the program plans on involving aid from stormwater management, upgrading wastewater treatment plants to biological nutrient removal, upgrading managing sewage systems, and developing tributary strategies for each basin. It also states that by 2010, they want to correct the nutrient-relation problems associated with the bay and remove it from the list of impaired waters under the Clean Water Act.
  - The sound land use portion of the agreement talks about permanently preserving 20 percent of the watershed from development by 2010. Also, by 2002, each state will coordinate transportation policies to reduce the dependence on automobiles by encouraging travel alternatives such as biking and bus riding.
  - Lastly, the stewardship section states that by 2001, they want to provide information to enhance the ability of citizen and community groups to participate in bay restoration. Also beginning in 2005, the Chesapeake Bay Program wants to provide an outdoor experience of the bay for every student before they graduate high school in order to encourage knowledge and awareness of the bay’s problems.

== Budget ==
Since the creation of the program, Congress has provided annual appropriations, and the budgets of the Environmental Protection Agency and Department of Agriculture have provided the majority of federal agency funds. Additional significant funding amounts from federal agencies have been provided by the Departments of Defense, Interior and Commerce. Funding has also been provided by the states of Maryland, Virginia, Delaware, New York, Pennsylvania and West Virginia; and the District of Columbia.

== Partners ==
=== Signatories to the Chesapeake Bay Agreement ===
- Chesapeake Bay Commission (legislative assembly representing Maryland, Virginia and Pennsylvania)
- Commonwealth of Pennsylvania
- Commonwealth of Virginia
- District of Columbia
- State of Maryland
- U.S. Environmental Protection Agency

=== Headwater State Partners ===
- New York State
- State of Delaware
- State of West Virginia

=== Federal Agency Partners ===
- Chesapeake Bay Environmental Enforcement Coalition
- National Aeronautics and Space Administration
- National Capital Planning Commission
- U.S. Department of Agriculture
  - Farm Service Agency
  - Natural Resources Conservation Service
  - U.S. National Arboretum
- U.S. Department of Commerce
- U.S. Department of Defense
- U.S. Department of Education
- U.S. Department of the Interior
- U.S. Department of Transportation
- U.S. General Services Administration
- U.S. Postal Service

=== Academic Institution Partners ===
- Academy of Natural Sciences
- Chesapeake Research Consortium
- College of William and Mary
- Cornell Cooperative Extension
- Old Dominion University
- Pennsylvania State University
- Smithsonian Institution
- University of Delaware Cooperative Extension
- University of the District of Columbia
- University of Maryland Center for Environmental Science
- University of Maryland
- University of Maryland, Eastern Shore
- University of Pennsylvania
- University of Virginia
- Virginia Cooperative Extension
- Virginia Polytechnic Institute and State University
- West Virginia University

=== More Partners ===
- Alliance for the Chesapeake Bay
- American Forests
- Anacostia Watershed Society
- Center for Chesapeake Communities
- Center for Watershed Protection
- Chesapeake Bay Foundation
- Chesapeake Bay Trust
- Consortium for International Earth Science Information Network
- Ducks Unlimited
- Ecosystem Solutions
- International City/County Management Association
- Interstate Commission on the Potomac River Basin
- Izaak Walton League
- Low Impact Development Center
- Metropolitan Washington Council of Governments
- Montgomery County Department of Environmental Protection
- National Fish and Wildlife Foundation
- Potomac Conservancy
- Susquehanna River Basin Commission
- Upper Susquehanna Coalition

== See also ==
- Clagett Farm - Project of the Chesapeake Bay Foundation
