= Rogers Road (disambiguation) =

Rogers Road is a name found in various places.

== Canada ==
- Rogers Road is a local road in Toronto.
- Rogers Road streetcar line was a former transit line in Toronto

== United States ==
- Rogers Road is a community in Orange County, North Carolina
