= Eric Freyfogle =

American research professor and conservationist

Eric T. Freyfogle (born 1952) is a research professor at the University of Illinois College of Law and Swanlund Chair Emeritus at the University of Illinois at Urbana-Champaign. He is a writer and lecturer on nature and culture, on environmental and natural-resource challenges, and on private property considered as a dynamic, socially constructed institution. He has long been active in state and national conservation causes, including service on the Boards of Directors of the National Wildlife Federation and the Illinois-based Prairie Rivers Network.

== Biography ==
Freyfogle was born in 1952 in Decatur, Illinois, and attended public schools there. Upon graduating from Stephen Decatur High School in 1970 he studied history at Lehigh University in Bethlehem, Pennsylvania, on an Army ROTC scholarship, graduating in 1973. He then attended the University of Michigan Law School, where he served as Managing Editor of the Michigan Law Review. After law school graduation in 1976 he served as an Army JAGC Captain for four years in the Office of the Army General Counsel in the Pentagon, followed by three years as an associate at the Indianapolis law firm of Baker & Daniels (now Feagre Baker Daniels). He is a long-time lay leader at University Place Christian Church, Champaign, Illinois.

== Academic career ==
Since joining the faculty of the University of Illinois College of Law in 1983 Freyfogle has largely focused his teaching and writing in the areas of property and natural resources law, including wildlife and water law, and on land use law and conservation thought. Following time as the Max L. Rowe Professor of Law and the Guy Raymond Jones Chair in Law he was appointed by the University of Illinois at Urbana-Champaign in 2012 to the position of Swanlund Endowed Professor, the highest academic position at the campus. He has held visiting professorships at the College of William and Mary, the University of Utah, and the University of Michigan and served as a visiting fellow at the Stellenbosch Institute for Advanced Study in South Africa and a Herbert Smith Freehills Visitor to the Law Faculty of the University of Cambridge. He has lectured in the United States and elsewhere, including Brazil, Canada, Great Britain, Italy, Korea, New Zealand, and South Africa.

== Scholarship ==
Freyfogle is known for his wide-ranging, critical writings about private property, which he presents as an evolving, morally complex social institution that is as much cultural as it is legal. His 2003 book, The Land We Share: Private Property and the Common Good, critiques property laws and norms from an ecological perspective and proposes reforms to reduce environmental decline.

His 2007 book, On Private Property: Finding Common Ground on the Ownership of Land, seeks to correct what he terms the widespread “half truths” about private property, explores property's functions and justifications, considers when landowners should be paid for development restrictions, and proposes a “bill of rights” for “the responsible landowner.” These writings and others—including “Property Rights in an Era of Transformation: The Record of the United States” and “Community and the Market in Modern American Property Law”—reflect his longstanding interest in the evolution of U.S. property law and the ways property norms embody evolving social understandings. They also reflect, as do other writings—including “Property and Liberty” and “Private Ownership and Human Flourishing: An Exploratory Overview,”—his interests in the complex, contradictory ways private property can influence human well-being. In various works he has called upon the national conservation movement to take greater interest in private property as an institution and to counter inherited assumptions with a vision of more ecologically responsible land ownership. He has also challenged the presumed divide between public land and private land, contending that all lands reflect varied mixes of public and private.

The other central topic of Freyfogle's writings has been the plight of humans in nature, understood culturally and normatively. His writings here have been distinctly interdisciplinary, making extensive use of environmental history and philosophy, ecological thought, and relevant social science scholarship. Many of his mature ideas came together in two books published by the University of Chicago Press in 2017. A Good That Transcends: Culture Change and Our Common Home explores the cultural roots of human misuses of nature, building upon such earlier works as Agrarianism and the Good Society (2007) and Why Conservation is Failing and How It Can Regain Ground (2006). The book illustrates, as do other works, his long interest in the writings of Aldo Leopold and Wendell Berry and features commentary on Laudato Si’ by Pope Francis. Ultimately the book “proposes, as a means to improve our dealings with nature, a far different intellectual and moral template than the one that has guided progressive reform throughout America's history.” (p. 2) His other 2017 volume, Our Oldest Task: Making Sense of Our Place in Nature, takes up the challenges of distinguishing normatively between the legitimate use of nature and the abuse of it, taking account of the many relevant ecological, social, and moral factors. (Sustainability as a goal, he contends, “is no more than a feeble step . . . an initial foray.” (p. 195)). The work “endeavors to set the full intellectual stage” (p. 5) by exploring the sources of normativity and the rightful role of humans in attributing moral value while critiquing the moral thinness of modern liberal thought and the values embedded in market capitalism. It concludes with a strategy to put modern culture on a new trajectory. An earlier work on nature and culture, Bounded People, Boundless Lands: Envisioning a New Land Ethic (1998) received the Adult Nonfiction Award of the Chicago-based Society of Midland Authors.

Along with the writings in these two areas have been others on more narrowly legal topics. His challenges to western water law show up in “Water Justice”; “Water Rights and the Common Wealth”; a trilogy of writings surveying the course of California water law; and his 2017 Wallace Stegner Lecture at the University of Utah, “Water, Community, and the Culture of Owning,” which includes a proposal for major legal reform. His writings on wildlife law include a co-authored work, Wildlife Law: A Primer (2d ed. 2019), the only survey of U.S. wildlife law.

== Selected publications ==
- “Water, Community, and the Culture of Owning” (2018). Salt Lake City: University of Utah Press. ISBN 9781607816324.
- “The Climate-Change Challenge to Human-Drawn Boundaries (2018), C. Murphy, P. Gardoni, & R. McKim, eds., Climate Change and Its Implication: Risks and Inequalities. Cham, Switzerland: Spring International Publishing. ISBN 978-3-319-77543-2.
- Our Oldest Task: Making Sense of Our Place in Nature (2017). Chicago: University of Chicago Press. ISBN 978-0-226-32639-9.
- A Good That Transcends: How U.S. Culture Undermines Environmental Reform (2017). Chicago: University of Chicago Press. ISBN 978-0-226-32611-5.
- Natural Resources Law: Private Rights and the Public Interest (with Michael Blumm and Blake Hudson) (2015). St. Paul, MN: Thomson-West. ISBN 978-0-314-28912-4.
- “Property Law in an Era of Transformation: The Record of the United States” (2014), South African Law Journal, 131: 883-921.
- “Private Ownership and Human Flourishing: A Critical Review” (2013), Stellenbosch (SA) Law Review 24: 430-454.
- Property Law: Power, Governance, and the Common Good (with Bradley Karkkainen) (2012). St. Paul, MN: Thomson-West. ISBN 978-0-314-91174-2.
- “Property and Liberty” (2010), Harvard Environmental Law Review 34: 75-118.
- Wildlife Law: A Primer (with Dale D. Goble) (2009). Washington: Island Press. ISBN 978-1-55963-975-0.
- “The Land Ethic” (2009), in J. Baird Callicott & Robert Frodeman, eds., Encyclopedia of Environmental Ethics and Philosophy. New York: Macmillan. ISBN 978-0-02-866137-7.
- On Private Property: Finding Common Ground on the Ownership of Land (2007). Boston: Beacon Press. ISBN 978-0-8070-4416-2.
- Agrarianism and the Good Society: Land, Culture, Conflict & Hope (2007). Lexington:University Press of Kentucky. ISBN 978-0-8131-2439-1.
- Why Conservation Is Failing and How It Can Regain Ground (2006). New Haven: Yale University Press. ISBN 978-0-300-11040-1.
- The Land We Share: Private Property and the Common Good (2003). Washington, D.C.: Island Press/Shearwater Books. ISBN 1-55963-890-7.
- “Private Lands Made (Too) Simple” (2003), Environmental Law Reporter 3310155-10169.
- “Community and the Market in Modern American Property Law” (2002), in John F. Richards, ed., Land, Property, and the Environment. Oakland, CA: ICS Press. ISBN 1-55815-516-3.
- Editor, The New Agrarianism: Land, Culture, and the Community of Life (2001). Washington, D.C.: Island Press/Shearwater Books. ISBN 1-55963-920-2.
- “Regulatory Takings, Methodically” (2001), Environmental Law Reporter 31: 10313-321.
- Co-Editor (with J. Baird Callicott) of Aldo Leopold, For the Health of the Land (1999). Washington, D.C.: Island Press/Shearwater Books. ISBN 1-55963-763-3.
- Bounded People, Boundless Lands: Envisioning a New Land Ethic (1998). Washington, D.C.: Island Press/Shearwater Books, recipient of Adult Nonfiction Award of the Society of Midland Authors, 1999. ISBN 1-55963-418-9.
- “Water Rights and the Common Wealth” (1996), Environmental Law 26: 27-51.
- “The Owning and Taking of Sensitive Lands” (1995), U.C.L.A. Law Review 43: 77-138.
- “The Ethical Strands of Environmental Law” (1994), University of Illinois Law Review 1994: 819-846.
- Justice and the Earth: Images for Our Planetary Survival (1993). New York: The Free Press. ISBN 0-02-910695-8.
- “Context and Accommodation in Modern Property Law” (1989), Stanford Law Review 41: 1529-56.
- “Water Justice” (1986), University of Illinois Law Review 1986: 481-519.
- “Land Use and the Study of Early American History” (1985), Yale Law Journal 94: 717-742.
