= Red Gate Park =

Park in Rockville, Maryland

Coordinates: 39.097°N 77.127°W

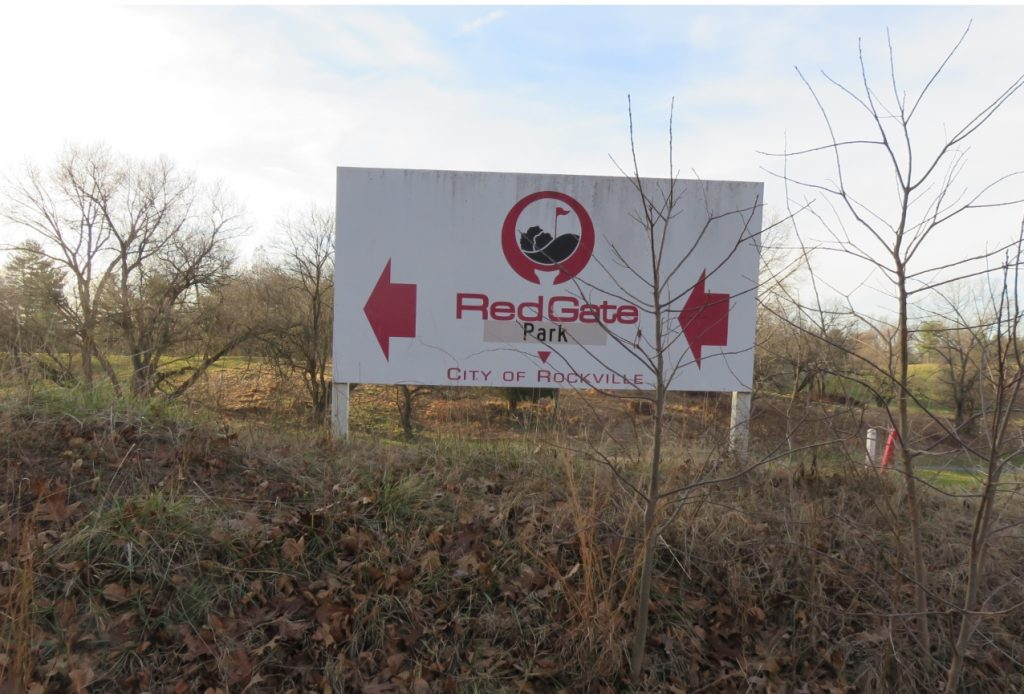
RedGate Park

RedGate Park is a wooded public park in suburban Rockville, Maryland, with over 131 acres of natural green space, situated between Maryland Route 28, parts of Rock Creek Regional Park, and Avery Road. It is administered by the Rockville, Maryland government as a public park and nature preserve.

The park began as a public golf course, called RedGate Golf Course, which was designed and built in 1974. It operated until 2018, when the city of Rockville decided to close the course after a $3.2 million estimate for necessary repairs compelled the management company, Billy Casper Golf, a golf course management company located in Reston, Virginia, to terminate its 10-year lease three years early, opening up the possibility for redevelopment or preservation.

From 2018 to March 2020, extensive debate and discussion took place among city officials and residents regarding the best future for the land, leading the Rockville local government to host information and input sessions to determine its most suitable use.

Friends of RedGate Park, a 501(c)(3) non-profit organization, formed in early 2018 to advocate for converting the defunct golf course into a public park dedicated to nature conservation and passive recreation.

Filmmaker Cintia Cabib produced a documentary which focuses on the birds and birders at RedGate Park and on the grassroots campaign which advocated that the defunct golf course be transformed into a public park.

In March 2020, the city of Rockville voted unanimously to retain the entirety of the 131-acre park as a public nature preservation area. In October 2022, RedGate Park was renamed to RedGate Park and Arboretum.

The park still retains the asphalt paths suited to golf carts, and many of the fixtures and structures that are common to a golf course, but the course itself has largely been absorbed by natural reclamation. This follows a recent trend of declining popularity for the sport of golf, and an increased desire for green space.

According to the Friends of RedGate Park organization, the park now hosts 175 species of native Maryland birds, with adjacent forests and open spaces that provide essential feeding habitats; it is also frequented by other wildlife such as deer and fox. In August 2019, Cornell’s Ornithology designated the site as a "Birding Hotspot" on eBird.

A city-approved master plan was submitted that would transform the mostly-wild green space into a developed multi-use park, with such amenities including a new visitor center, a dog park, community gardens, new road connections, a playground, a picnic area, and other improvements. The dog park was completed in 2024.

In September 2023, the Chesapeake Bay Trust awarded the City of Rockville a $199,930 grant through its Urban Trees Award Program to support the reforestation of RedGate Park. The funds are earmarked to plant over 1,000 trees and 500 shrubs along the park’s southern tract, in line with the Mayor and Council’s approved RedGate Master Plan.

RedGate Park is a grassland habitat, dotted with man-made water features and mature trees that were installed during its time as a golf course. The park is adjacent to the National Park Service's Rock Creek Trail system, though currently there is no pedestrian or bicycle path connection between the two.
