= AAEA =

AAEA may refer to:

- African American Environmentalist Association
- Association of African Election Authorities
- Agricultural & Applied Economics Association
