= Keep Indianapolis Beautiful =

Non-profit environmental organization based in Indiana

Keep Indianapolis Beautiful Inc. (KIBI)
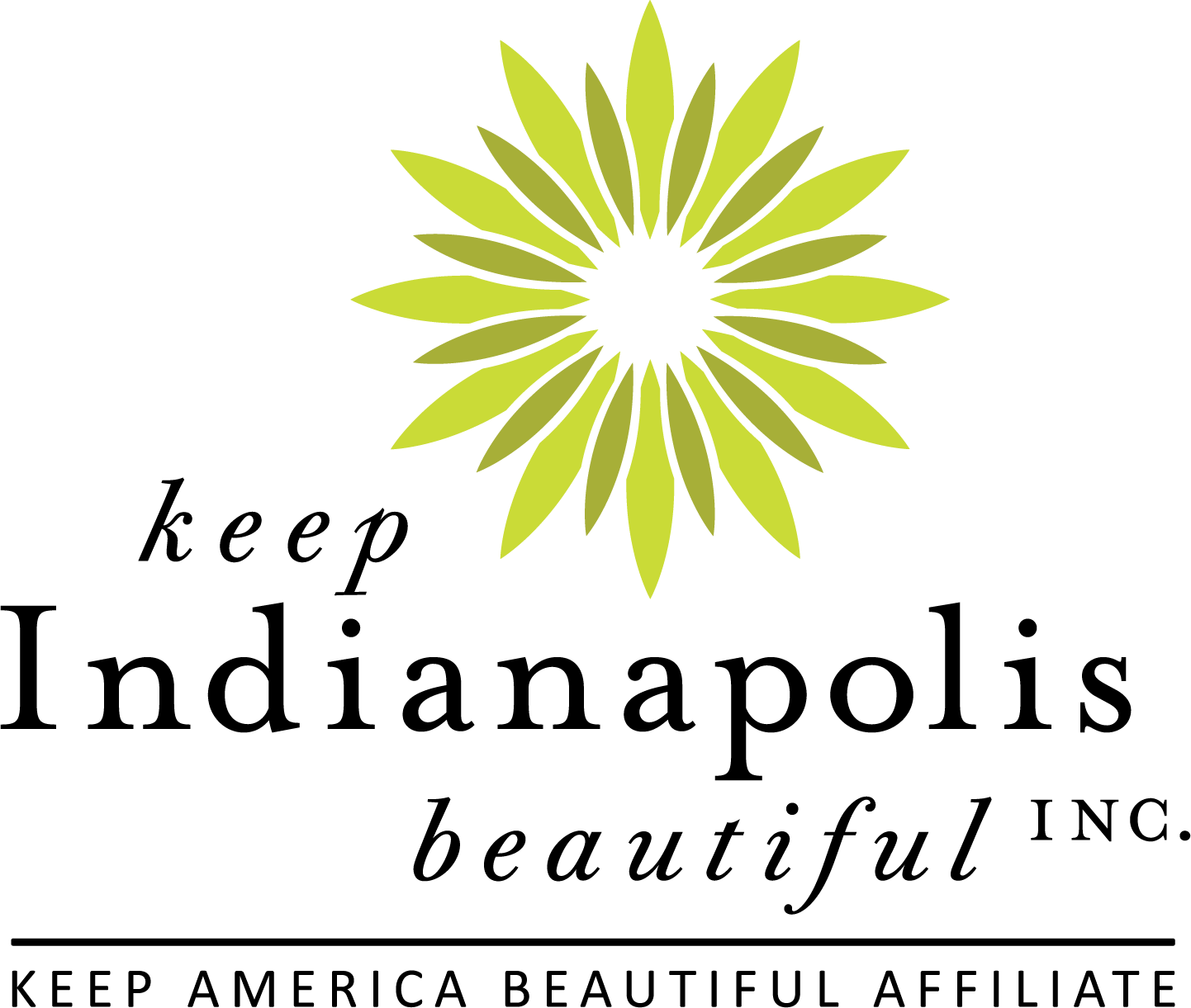
- Formation: 1976
- Headquarters: 1029 Fletcher Avenue Indianapolis, IN 46203
- Location: Indianapolis, IN, United States of America
- CEO and President: Jeremy Kranowitz
- COO: Kristina Uland
- Board Chair: Chris Tucker
- Board Vice Chair: Maithilee Das Lappin
- Affiliations: Keep America Beautiful
- Website: https://www.kibi.org/

Keep Indianapolis Beautiful Inc. (KIBI) is a non-profit organization based in Indianapolis, Indiana, United States. It was founded in 1981 as an affiliate of Keep America Beautiful. The non-profit company works towards building community in the Indianapolis area and "supporting environmental growth". It is located in the Fountain Square neighborhood, which is a historical location in Indianapolis.

== Programs ==
=== Youth Tree Team ===
KIBI's Youth Tree Team is a crew of 60 students who work over the summer with the community to plant trees and preserve parks and natural areas. The position is paid and is an opportunity to develop skills such as compassion, cooperation, and diligence. Applications are open during the winter months, with the intent of a team being created by the summer months.

=== Adopt-A-Block ===
The Adopt-A-Block program provides citizens, companies, and neighborhoods with free supplies to clean the city blocks that they adopted. The program results from a partnership with the city of Indianapolis and the Department of Public Works.

=== Great Indy Cleanup ===
A Great Indy Cleanup is performed by the organizer providing volunteers and assisting with promotion, and KIBI itself providing supplies, media resources, and dumpsters (limited availability).

=== Project GreenSpace ===
Project GreenSpace was a program that, through AES Indiana, was designed to help make Indiana nature more "green" with grass, trees, and outdoor spaces in such places as parks, orchards and outdoor classrooms.

== News ==
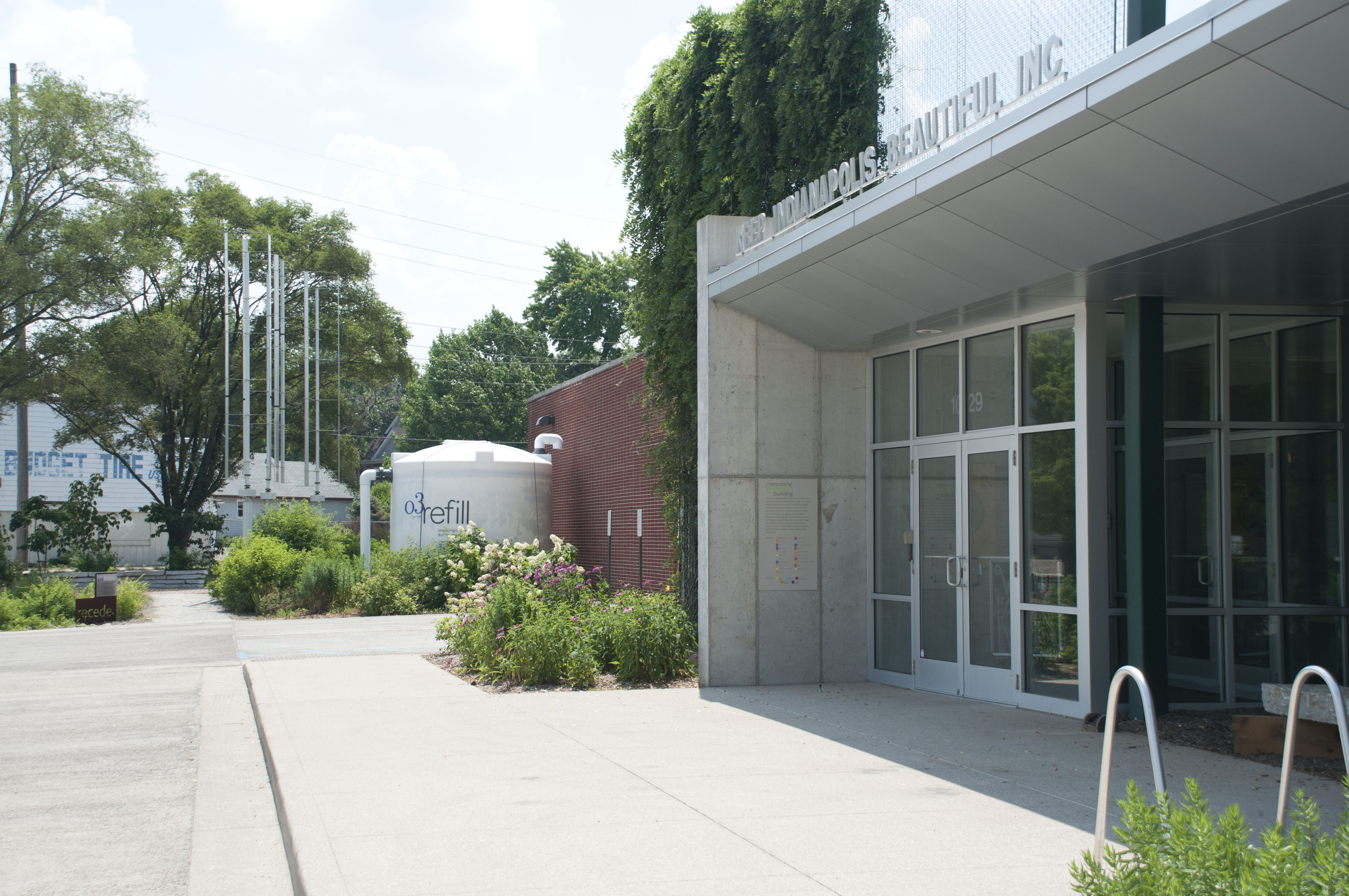
KIB headquarters in 2013

KIBI collaborates with many universities in Indiana to procure student volunteers.

In January 2025, the organization was given a $400,000 grant for Arbor Day to plant trees. In February 2025, the grant was taken back. The specific reasons for the retraction is unknown.

== See also ==
- List of environmental and conservation organizations in the United States
