= Collins Crossing =

Residential complex in North Carolina

Coordinates: 35.906°N 79.084°W

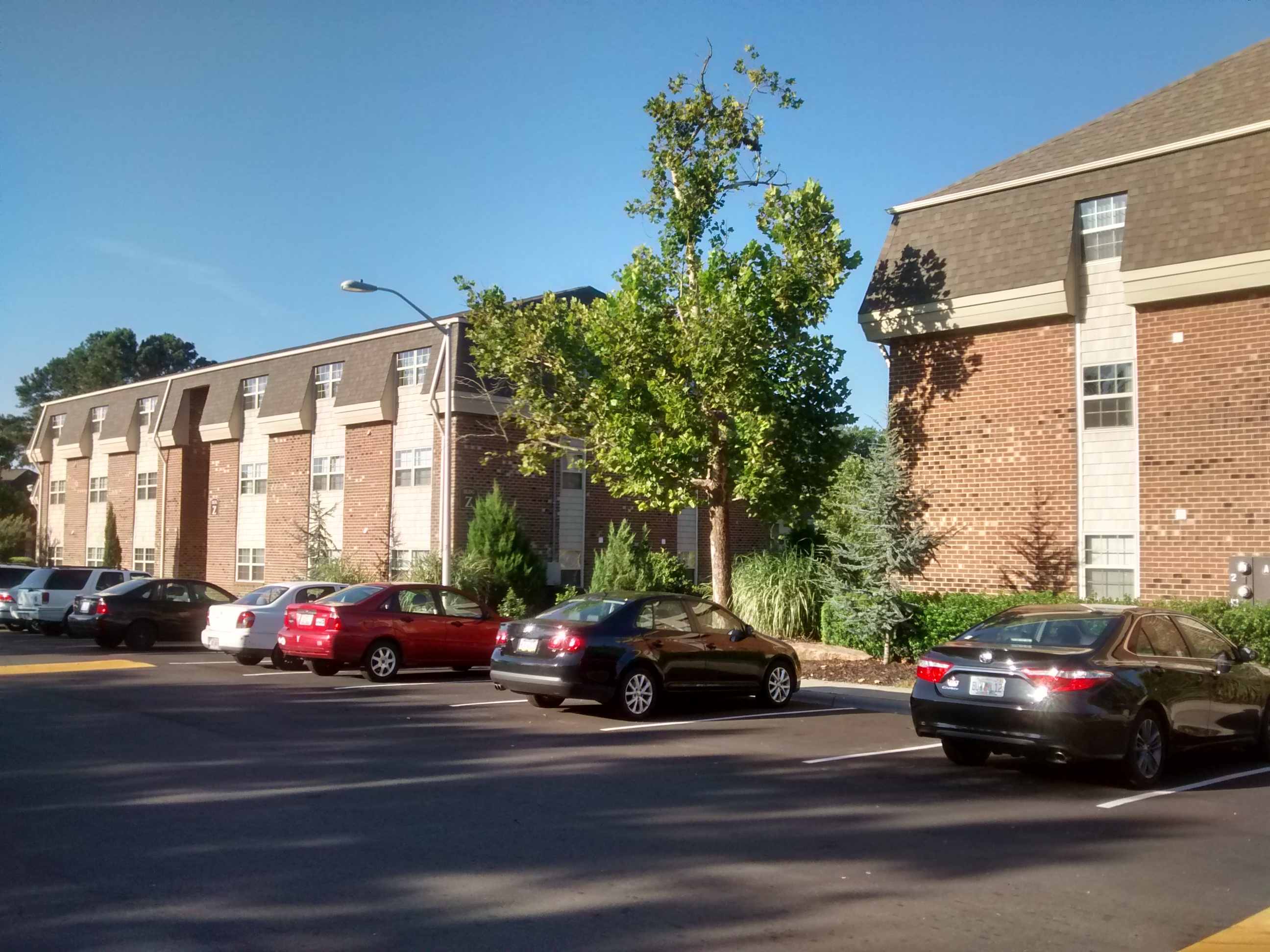
Residences in 2016

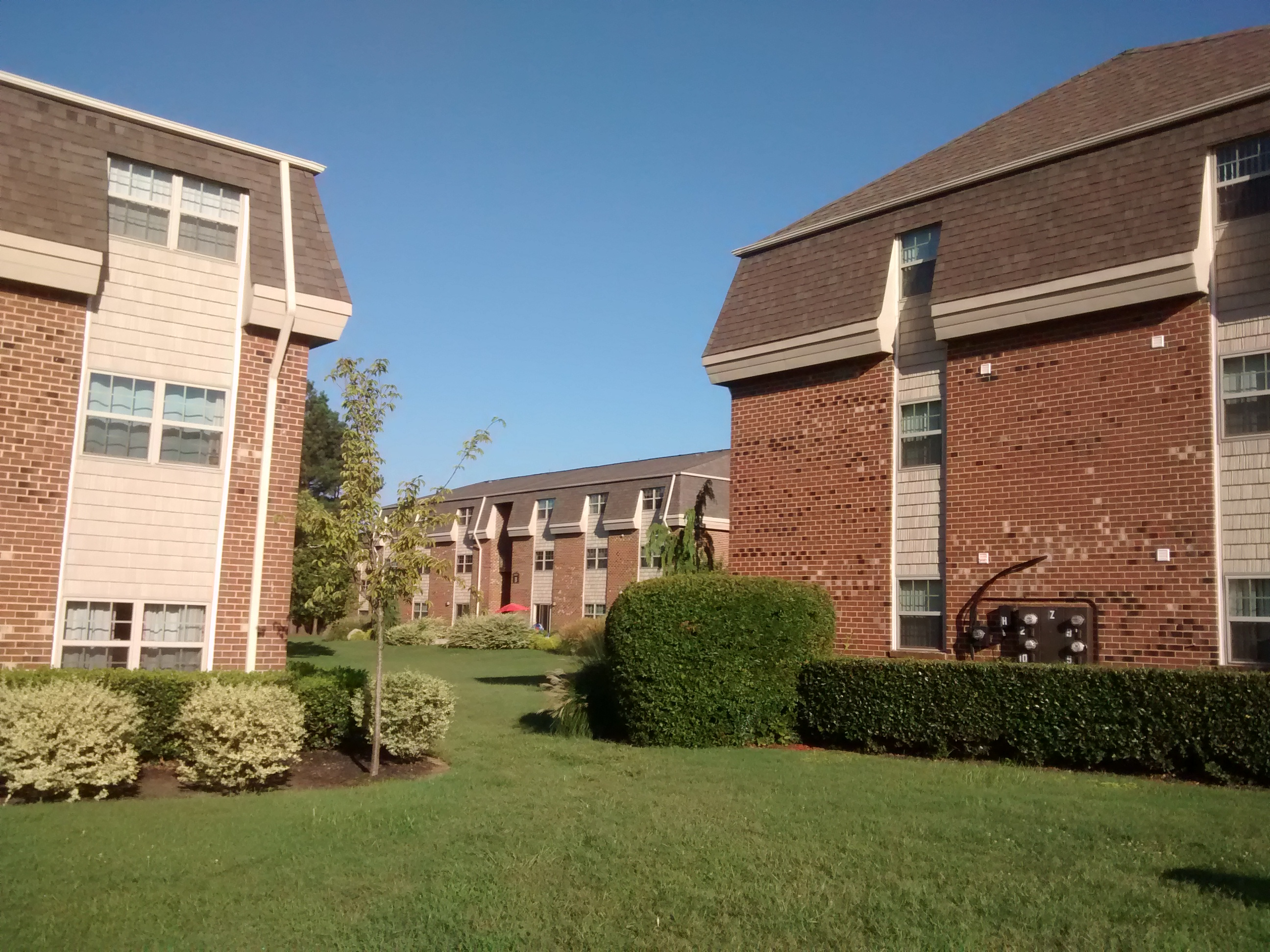
Residences in 2016

Formerly Abby Court, and previously Old Well, is a complex of over 300 residences in North Carolina.

Despite initially being advertised as a complex of condominiums, as of 2010, only about 40 of the units were privately owned. It was purchased in 2012 by Aspen Square Management and underwent extensive renovations along with its new name.

== History ==
The property had historically been plagued by problems with crime, particularly drug-related incidents. When different management took over after a series of high-profile drug busts, they changed the name from Old Well to Abbey Court in an effort to clear the complex’s image.

A high-profile crime occurred at Abbey Court in June 2006, when a 19-year-old man killed his cousin in a parking lot and then shot himself. The men had been arguing over money; neither of the men lived at Abbey Court.

In July 2008, the now-named Abbey Court was again in the news because of a controversy in which the managers began to deny tenants permission to park after requiring residents to display a permit on their cars or be towed. Cars with dents and paint imperfections or cracked windshields were denied permits and began to be towed away. Subsequently, the tenants organized a protest and filed a series of complaints with the city of Carrboro. Cars that had been denied due to issues with appearance were re-assessed. Some protesting residents accused the managers of discriminating against Latino residents. The town sent a housing inspector to check the conditions of the residences.

An organization called Play Street Soccer, an affiliate of the Chapel Hill and Carrboro Human Rights Center, also hosts pick up soccer games for the youth of the complex once each week. The organization began hosting games in the spring of 2011 with the hope of empowering children and building community through soccer.

== Renowned residents ==
Hall of Fame American football player Lawrence Taylor lived at Old Well while he attended the University of North Carolina at Chapel Hill in the late 1970s.
