= Crystal Spring Farm =

- U.S. National Register of Historic Places
- U.S. Historic district
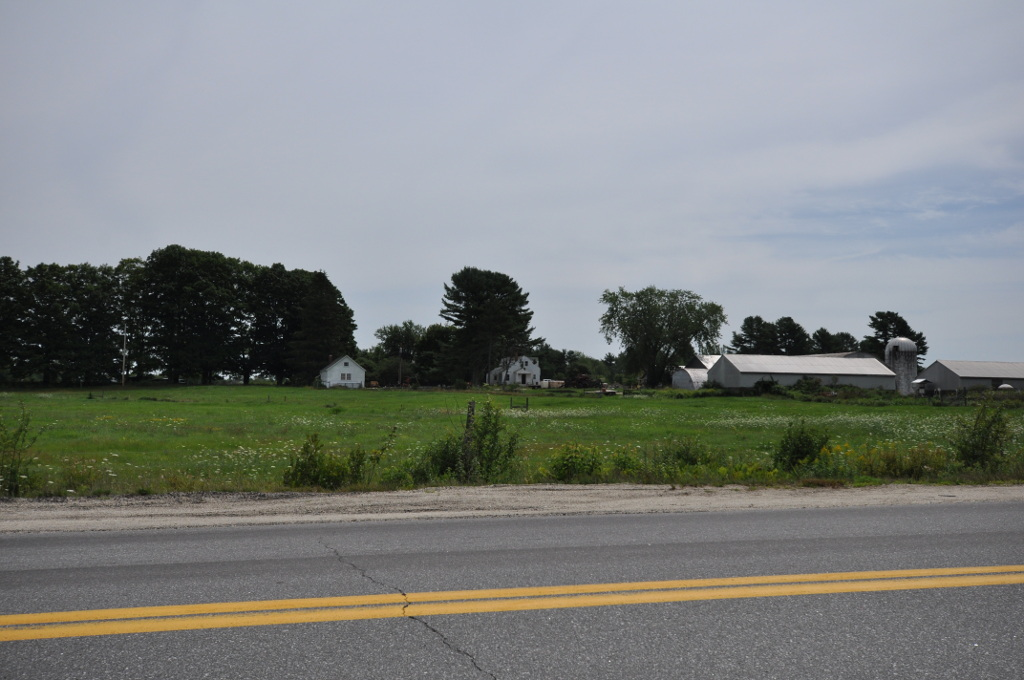

- Location within Maine Location within the United States
- Location: 277 Pleasant Hill Rd., Brunswick, Maine
- Coordinates: 43°53′24″N 69°59′49″W
- Area: 160 acres (65 ha)
- Built: 1947
- Architect: Dr. Bertrand Dionne
- Architectural style: Federal, Late Victorian
- NRHP reference No.: 04000369
- Added to NRHP: April 29, 2004

Crystal Spring Farm is a historic farm property at 277 Pleasant Hill Road in Brunswick, Maine. The 160-acre (65 ha) property has an agricultural history dating to the early 19th century, although most of its buildings are now of mid-20th century origin. The property is now owned by the Brunswick-Topsham Land Trust (BTLT), and is operated as a community farm. It was listed on the National Register of Historic Places in 2004.

== Description and history ==
Crystal Spring Farm is located in a rural area of southwestern Brunswick, its building complex set southeast of the junction of Pleasant Hill and Woodside Roads. The associated farmland consists of two large parcels south of Pleasant Hill Road and on either side of Woodside. The land is predominantly open fields, with some woodlots. The farm complex includes ten buildings, organized roughly in a U shape, with the main house at the eastern end. The house is a 19th-century agglomeration of several residential structures that have been stitched together. To its northwest stands an early 20th-century slaughterhouse. The remaining buildings all date to a building program prompted by a fire in 1946 that destroyed the rest of the original complex. These buildings include concrete barns for housing dairy cattle and processing their milk, a Quonset hut for the storage of hay, equipment sheds and workshops, and a silo.

The area is first documented to have been farmed by the Woodside family, which worked land that included this farm's property for about 120 years beginning in 1783. New owners converted it to principally dairy farming in the early 20th century, and in 1941 it was purchased by Maurice Dionne, whose brother Bert, a veterinarian, took over its operation. He greatly expanded its capacity and production, set back by the 1946 fire. It is possible that the Quonset structures now in use were surplus military materials from the nearby Brunswick Naval Air Station. Its business in decline, the Dionnes sold to the Oakhurst Dairy, a major regional dairy processor. In 1970 the farm's activity was shifted to beef production. In 1997 the Brunswick-Topsham Land Trust (BTLT) purchased 160 acres (since expanded to more than 300), with the aim of preserving the farm as open space and a working agricultural area. It is now used for community-supported agriculture, and the property has walking trails open to the public.

In 2024, BTLT purchased 25 acres (10 ha) of adjoining land at 262 Pleasant Hill Road that was formerly part of the farm. The seller was an anonymous individual who purchased the land in late 2023. They sold it to the land trust via a two-year private loan. The acquired land, on the northern side of Pleasant Hill Road, includes a historic barn and a clock tower which contains the original clock from Brunswick Town Hall prior to its demolition in the 1960s.

== See also ==
- National Register of Historic Places listings in Cumberland County, Maine
