= Stephen Decatur High School (Decatur, Illinois) =

Former school in Illinois

Stephen Decatur High School (orig. Decatur High School)
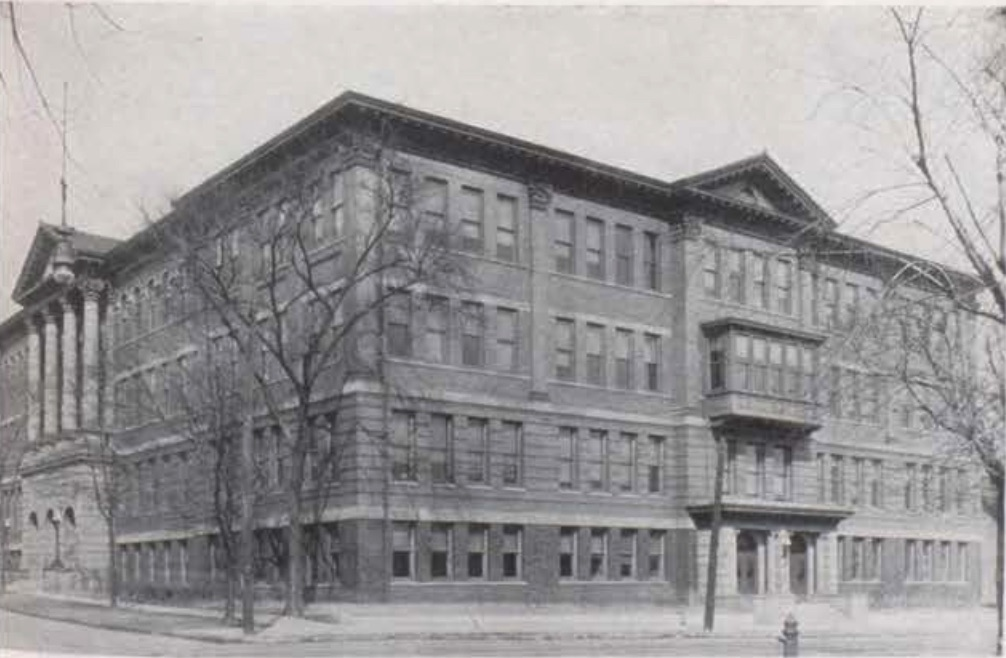

Location
- Decatur, Illinois, US
- Coordinates: 39.8452°N 88.9523°W

Information
- Type: Public High School
- School district: Decatur Public Schools; District 61
- Colors: Red and White
- Team name: Reds (until 1945); Running Reds (after 1945 state basketball championship)
- Newspaper: The Observer
- Yearbook: The Decanois

Stephen Decatur High School was a public high school in Decatur, Illinois, United States, which existed from 1862 to 2000. Stephen Decatur High School was simply known as Decatur High School until 1957, when the city's only high school was joined by Lakeview High School (a small rural district absorbed by consolidation), and MacArthur and Eisenhower High Schools, which were newly constructed to accommodate the student population that was exploding as a result of the post-World War 2 "baby boom".

The school, like the city, was named after Stephen Decatur, Jr. one of the great naval heroes of the post-Revolutionary War era. He battled pirates off the Barbary coast of Africa (twice), fought in the War of 1812, and at 25, is still the youngest person ever to achieve the rank of captain in the history of the U.S. Navy. He eventually attained the rank of commodore (a flag officer rank roughly equivalent to rear admiral) but was killed in a duel with a fellow naval officer.

== Locations ==
Thirty-three years after the city of Decatur, Illinois began as little more than a log cabin settlement along the banks of the Sangamon River, its first secondary school opened to hold a six-month school year, at the height of the Civil War in 1862-1863. The students met in a room in a building known as the Church Street School.

From 1863 to 1869, the high school held classes in the Baptist church on the northeast corner of East William and North Water Streets. The year 1867 saw the first graduating class from Decatur High School, which consisted of four girls who had completed the three-year course of study.

The first official high school building opened on the northwest corner of East North and North Broadway Streets in the fall of 1869 (today Broadway Street is known as Martin Luther King (MLK) Drive). A class of eight graduated in 1870, but there were no graduates in 1871, because the course of study was lengthened to four years. The student population was expanding in the latter part of the 1800s, and building additions were made in 1892 and 1895. A portion of this 19th-century building still existed into the late 1970s, when it was razed to make room for the grounds expansion of St. Patrick's Roman Catholic School, which stood between the two buildings.

By the year 1900, the school had grown to 731 students and 19 faculty members. It was clear that a new Decatur High School would need to be constructed to keep pace with the demand for educational services in the growing city of Decatur, Illinois.

That replacement building opened in the fall of 1911 in the block to the west of the older high school building, at the northeast corner of East North and North Franklin Streets, with an address of 400 North Franklin Street. The original portion of the building was constructed of red brick and had marble columns on the main west entrance. An additional three-floor classroom wing was added on the north end of the building in 1932. It is this building that most older adults today associate with (Stephen) Decatur High School, as it was in use for more than 60 years.

For a school fight song, the high school adapted the Northwestern University fight song, "Go You Northwestern", restyling it as "Go You Decatur". A recording of the song, made in the 1960s by the school's Redcoat marching/concert band, can be found here

== The Gay Kintner Era ==
In the late 1940s, Decatur High School added on a much larger 4200-seat gymnasium to the east side of the school. Called by some the finest gymnasium between Chicago and St. Louis, the high school facility was larger even than the University of Illinois Huff Gymnasium, where the nationally known Fighting Illini basketball team played its games at the time.

The new Decatur gym was necessary to house the crowds packing in to watch legendary coach Gay Kintner chase his fourth state title at the helm of the Stephen Decatur basketball team, having guided the team to state championships in 1931, 1936, and 1945. No Illinois high school basketball team had ever won four state championships. Decatur High teams had traditionally been called the "Reds", but after the 1945 championship, the team was nicknamed the "Running Reds"—and the name stuck.

On February 15, 1960, the last game of the regular season, Kintner had coached what many observers said was his best team since the 1945 state championship team to an 8-point lead over the crosstown rival MacArthur Generals at the Generals' home court. He had just emerged with the team from the locker room to begin the second half, when he collapsed from a heart attack and died on the court. The Stephen Decatur basketball facility was renamed Kintner Gymnasium in his honor. The 64-year-old Kintner (1895-1960) had coached the Running Reds for 32 years, through 948 games, winning over 68% of the time with a record of 649-299. The Running Reds finished that fateful 1959-1960 regular season with a 22-2 record, won the Regional, Sectional, Supersectional, and Quarterfinal rounds of the 1960 tournament, before falling to eventual state champion Chicago Marshall in the Semifinal round, and to West Frankfort in the consolation game, finishing fourth in the 1960 tournament.

Two years later, under Kintner's successor, Coach John Schneiter, the school won its fourth, and final, state championship, defeating a Chicago Carver High School team that featured future University of Michigan and NBA superstar Cazzie Russell. Decatur's Ken Barnes provided the winning margin on a free throw with six seconds left in the game.

All four championships were won under the older unified system, where all state schools competed in the same state tournament, before the introduction of the current class system that divides the state's schools by enrollment size and results in multiple "state champions" each year. Stephen Decatur High School is one of only a handful of Illinois schools with over 1000 basketball victories in its history (W-1352, L-912 for a .597 winning percentage 1913 - 2000)

== Notable alumni ==
- Lucille Carroll, nee Ryman
- June Christy, nee Shirley Luster, graduated from Decatur High School in 1943
- Annamary Dickey, soprano at the Metropolitan Opera and Broadway star in Rodgers and Hammerstein musicals, graduated 1928
- James Benton Parsons, U.S. District Judge and bandleader of first African-American band of World War II, graduated from Decatur High School in 1929
- Dave Scholz, basketball player for University of Illinois, draft pick of Philadelphia 76ers
- Eric Freyfogle, research professor and Swanlund Chair Emeritus at the University of Illinois at Urbana-Champaign
- Jackie Spinner, former Baghdad Bureau Chief of The Washington Post

== Closure of the 1911 building ==
After an arson fire in March 1970 destroyed classrooms and school offices in the southwest corner of the building, the facility reopened some weeks later, but after a study recommended replacing, rather than rehabilitating, the building, the building was scheduled for demolition in 1975. In the final school year for the original Stephen Decatur High School building (1974-1975), school class schedules were changed to accommodate the students from the crosstown Lakeview High School because of extensive damage that the Lakeview building received when a railroad car filled with isobutane exploded in a nearby railroad yard on July 19, 1974. Stephen Decatur students attended the building in the mornings and Lakeview students used the facility in the afternoons.

When the new Stephen Decatur High School campus opened in the fall of 1975 on the far north side of the city, it was the first high school in Decatur to be handicapped accessible (as it was all on one level) and the first to have air conditioning in the classrooms. The center jump circle from the old wooden floor at Kintner Gym was removed and hung on the wall in the new school's gym as a tribute to the original high school building. It could not be incorporated into the new gym's floor because the new gym floor's surface was rubberized rather than wood construction.

== Final Closure ==
Stephen Decatur was closed as a high school when Decatur Public Schools consolidated from three high schools to two due to reduced enrollment in District 61. At the time of the closure in 2000, the Stephen Decatur High School newspaper, The Observer, was the oldest continuously published school newspaper in Illinois, with 106 years of issues (1895-2000).

The former high school building re-opened as Stephen Decatur Middle School in 2001. The athletic teams at Stephen Decatur Middle school are still called the "Running Reds", although the school did not adopt the high school's fight song, "Go You Decatur" but rather created its own school song.

A 2012-2015 renovation project for the Eisenhower and MacArthur high school facilities caused the Stephen Decatur building to be used as a high school once again, while "Stephen Decatur Middle School" met in another facility in the center of the city—ironically, just across the street from the former site of the original Stephen Decatur High School.
