= Howland Forest =

Forest in Maine, United States

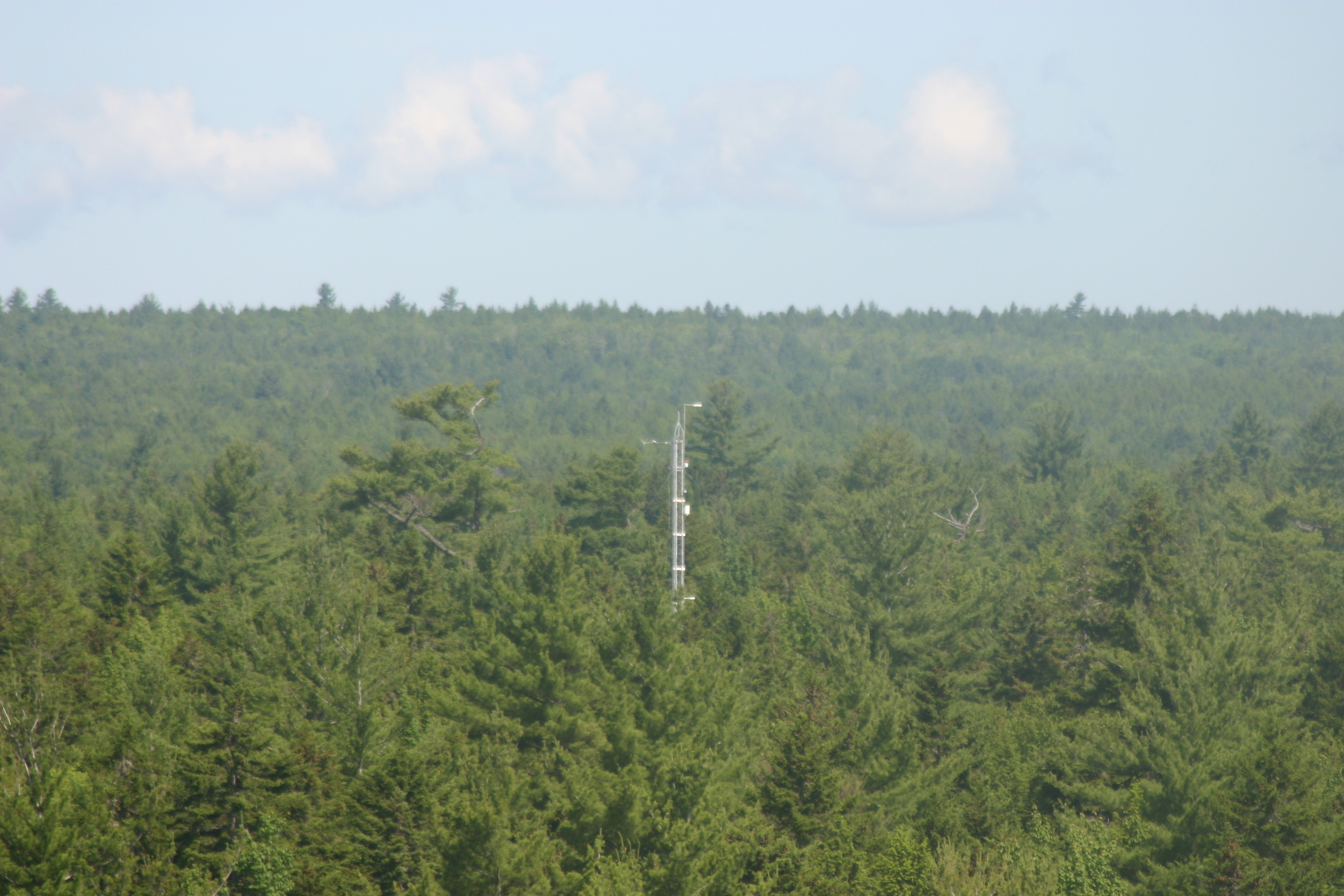
- View of the Howland Forest canopy from one of the site's research towers.

- Location within Maine
- Location: Maine, United States
- Nearest city: Bangor
- Coordinates: 45°12′N 68°44′W
- Owner: Northeast Wilderness Trust

The Howland Forest is a 558-acre tract of transitional boreal-hardwood forest located near Howland, Maine, which is part of the broader North Maine Woods.

== History ==
Well-decayed, uniformly distributed tree stumps are evidence of historical logging activity, which ceased around 1900. Since the forest's establishment as un unmanaged site, it has been only lightly disturbed. The tract is part of the 1.1 million acres (4,500 km^{2}) of Maine forest sold in 2005 by International Paper (IP) to the Seven Islands Land Company, a private forest investment management holding company. In 2007, the research forest was purchased by Northeast Wilderness Trust ensuring its wild and natural state into the future. The site was certified in 2013 as a Climate Action Reserve (CAR681) with the purpose of providing carbon offset credits. The Howland Forest is a founding member of the AmeriFlux and FLUXNET research networks. Land adjacent to the forest is owned by GMO Renewable Resources, LLC, used commercially for softwood timber.

== Topography ==
Flat to gently rolling forestland dominates the area, with pit-and-mound topography at fine scales. The forest is on average 60m above sea level. Elevation is highest in the north corner at 120m above sea level, sloping downward east and south to 19m above sea level at the southern edge. On the whole, elevation is minimally variable, with less than 68m change in elevation within a 10sqkm area.

== Climate ==
A cool, damp, continental climate characterizes the forest. Temperature varies greatly across months, with an average annual temperature of 6.2 °C (43.2 °F). Extreme temperatures occur in summer and winter, with summer maximums reaching 30 °C (86 °F) and winter minimums reaching -30 °C (86 °F). The first frost often occurs in October, around day 280 of the calendar year, while the first thaw is generally in March or April, roughly day 90 of the year. Precipitation is fairly consistent throughout the year, with an annual mean precipitation of 1148mm (45in). Roughly a quarter of annual precipitation is snow, which accumulates as a 2m snowpack between December and March.

== Ecology ==
The Howland Forest is situated at the ecotone of North American boreal spruce-fir zone, being predominately boreal northern hardwood transitional forest with some palustrine wetland sections. It falls within the New England/Acadian forests ecoregion. The forest overall has mixed-age composition, with some 100-200 year old remnant trees forming the canopy. The average height of the stand is about 20m tall. The forest's trees are roughly 90% coniferous, with abundant eastern hemlock (Tsuga canadensis) and red spruce (Picea rubens). These two species account for >70% of tree biomass within the forest. Other conifers include balsam fir (Abies balsamea), northern white cedar (Thuja occidentalis), and white pine (Pinus strobus). Among the 10% of deciduous trees, red maple (Acer rubrum), paper birch (Betula papyrifera), yellow birch (Betula alleghaniensis), and aspen (Populus grandidentata) are present. The soils are formed on coarse-loamy granitic basal till, which gives it an acidic character with high organic content and low fertility. Upland soils of the forest are Aquic Haplorthods - fine sandy loams. Soil drainage is highly variable across small areas, ranging from very poorly drained to well drained.

== Research forest ==
The tract had previously been designated as a research forest under IP's ownership, attracting researchers from the US Forest Service, the University of Maine, NASA, NOAA, and the Woods Hole Research Center. Areas of study included acid rain, nutrient cycling, soil ecology, and more recently, forest carbon uptake and loss. Various meteorological and scientific instruments are positioned throughout the site to support long-term research, NASA's Forest Ecosystem Dynamics Project among them. The forest has one of the longest records of carbon flux measurement in the world, dating to 1996, providing important information about carbon sequestration in mature forests.
