= Indiana Forest Alliance =

Non-profit environmental organization based in Indiana

- Founded: 1996
- Location: Indianapolis, Indiana
- Website: https://indianaforestalliance.org/

The Indiana Forest Alliance (IFA) is a non-profit environmental group based in Indianapolis, Indiana, United States. The IFA focuses on issues pertaining to the forests of the state of Indiana, particularly the preservation, longevity, and health of native forests. Their stated official mission is: "(t)o preserve and restore Indiana’s native hardwood ecosystem for the enjoyment of all."

== History ==
Founded in 1996, the Indiana Forest Alliance formed as a coalition of seven groups to coordinate efforts in protecting the Hoosier National Forest and various state forests. The IFA had their main office in Bloomington, IN until the summer of 2016, when they moved their office to Indianapolis, IN.

== Initiatives ==
In 2017–2018, the IFA has focused on a variety of initiatives including: the protection of the Yellowwood Backcountry Area (BCA) in Brown County, IN, the Wild Indiana Campaign promoting the designation of wild areas within Indiana state forests throughout the state, and surveying and inventorying the flora and fauna of Indiana forests.

== Awards ==
On December 2, 2017, IFA was awarded the Organization of the Year from the Hoosier Environmental Council.

== Criticism ==
Some criticize the IFA's efforts, arguing that logging and removing trees is necessary for forest health. Revenue from timber sales are also pointed to as a solution the Indiana Division of Forestry's declining budget and could potentially allow the Division of Forestry to increase the amount of forests through purchasing adjacent private lands. The Division of Forestry also points out that the state forests in Indiana exist partly to serve as a source of commodities for the state. Moreover, the Division of Forestry is required by Indiana state law to log timber in state forests that has worthy commercial value.

== See also ==
- List of environmental and conservation organizations in the United States
