= Stone Barn Farm =

- U.S. National Register of Historic Places
- U.S. Historic district
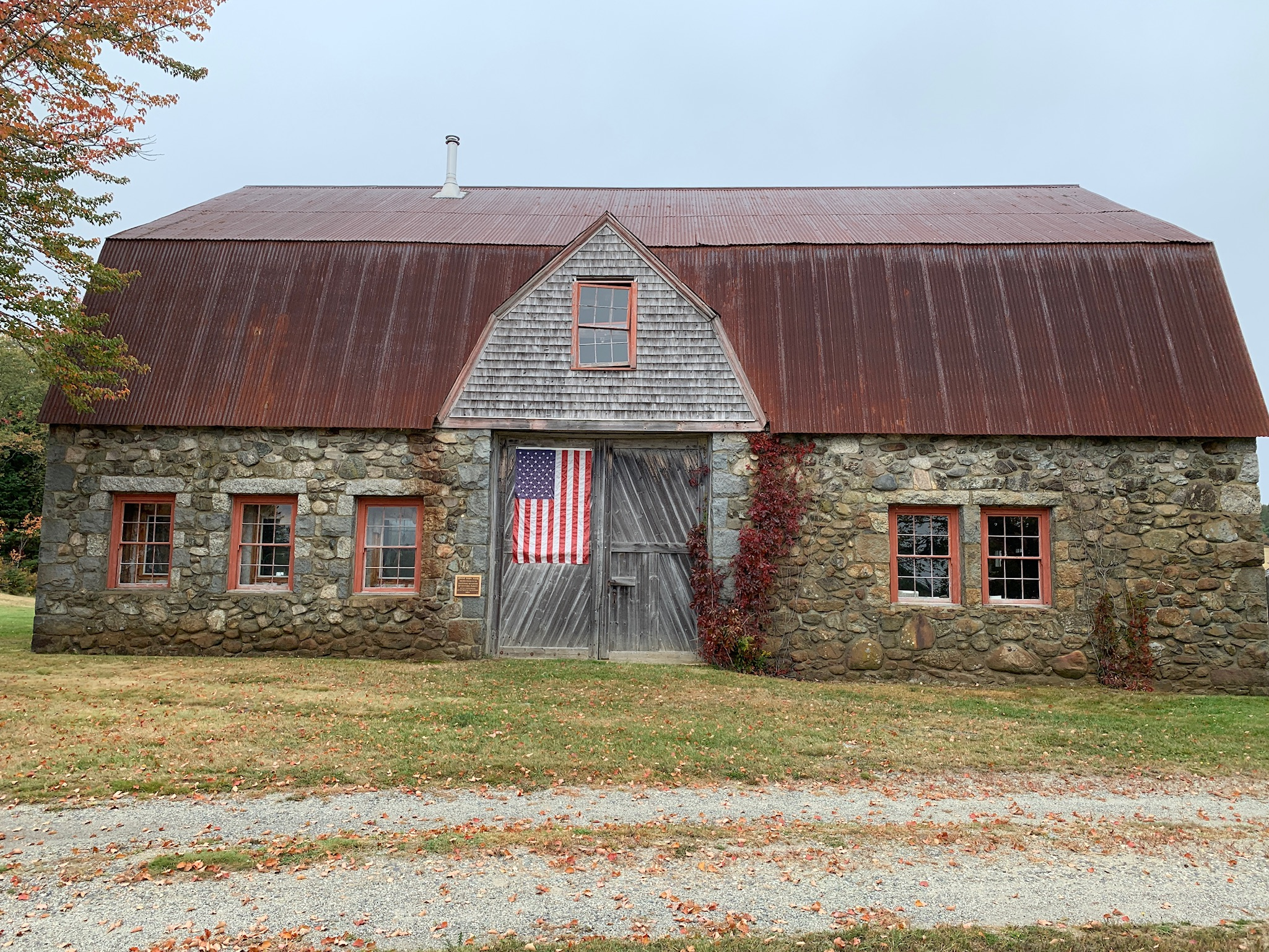
- The front of the barn in 2020

- Location within Maine Location within the United States
- Nearest city: Bar Harbor, Maine
- Area: 167 acres (68 ha)
- Built: 1850
- Built by: Richard Paine; Shea Brothers
- Architectural style: Mid 19th Century Revival
- NRHP reference No.: 01001271
- Added to NRHP: November 29, 2001

Stone Barn Farm is one of a small number of surviving farm properties on Mount Desert Island off the coast of Maine, United States. Located at the junction of Crooked Road and Norway Drive, the farm has a distinctive stone barn, built in 1907, along with a c. 1850 Greek Revival farm house and carriage barn. The property was listed on the National Register of Historic Places in 2001, and is subject to a conservation easement held by the Maine Coast Heritage Trust.

== Description and history ==
Stone Barn Farm occupies 167 acres (68 ha) of land in north-central Bar Harbor, a rural inland area of the fashionable resort community. It is set on the north side of Crooked Road, just west of its junction with Norway Drive, and consists of 30 acres (12 ha) each of fields and marshland, and about 100 acres (40 ha) of woodland. The farm complex is set near Crooked Road, and consists of a wood-frame house and carriage barn, and an unusual gambrel-roofed barn whose first level is stone and granite (the latter quarried from nearby Otter Creek). As of 2020, only its southern gambrel end is clapboarded. The house is 1 1/2 stories in height, with a three-bay gabled front sheltered by a hip-roofed porch. Two additions extend to the rear of the building. The carriage house a single-story clapboarded structure with a gable roof, and a track-mounted sliding door providing access to its interior. The stone barn is fashioned out of glacial till, and has a two-leaf board-and-batten door providing access to its interior.

The farmhouse and carriage house were probably built sometime between 1850 and 1860, based on their architectural style, although local histories have placed the farmhouse construction as early as 1840. The builder was Richard Paine, whose farm was 45 acres (18 ha), most of it uncleared, in 1860. In 1907 Paine's son, Willis, sold the farm to the Shea Brothers masonry firm, who may have built the stone barn as a vehicle to showcase their building skills. The Sheas eventually leased the property back to the Paines for a time. In 1963, the property was acquired by Harry and Mary "Cindy" Owen, who granted the Maine Coast Heritage Trust (MCHT) a conservation easement on the property in 2001. MCHT purchased the property in 2019 for $625,000.

== See also ==
- National Register of Historic Places listings in Hancock County, Maine
