= Rogers Road =

Community in Orange County, North Carolina, United States

Coordinates: 35.959°N 79.084°W

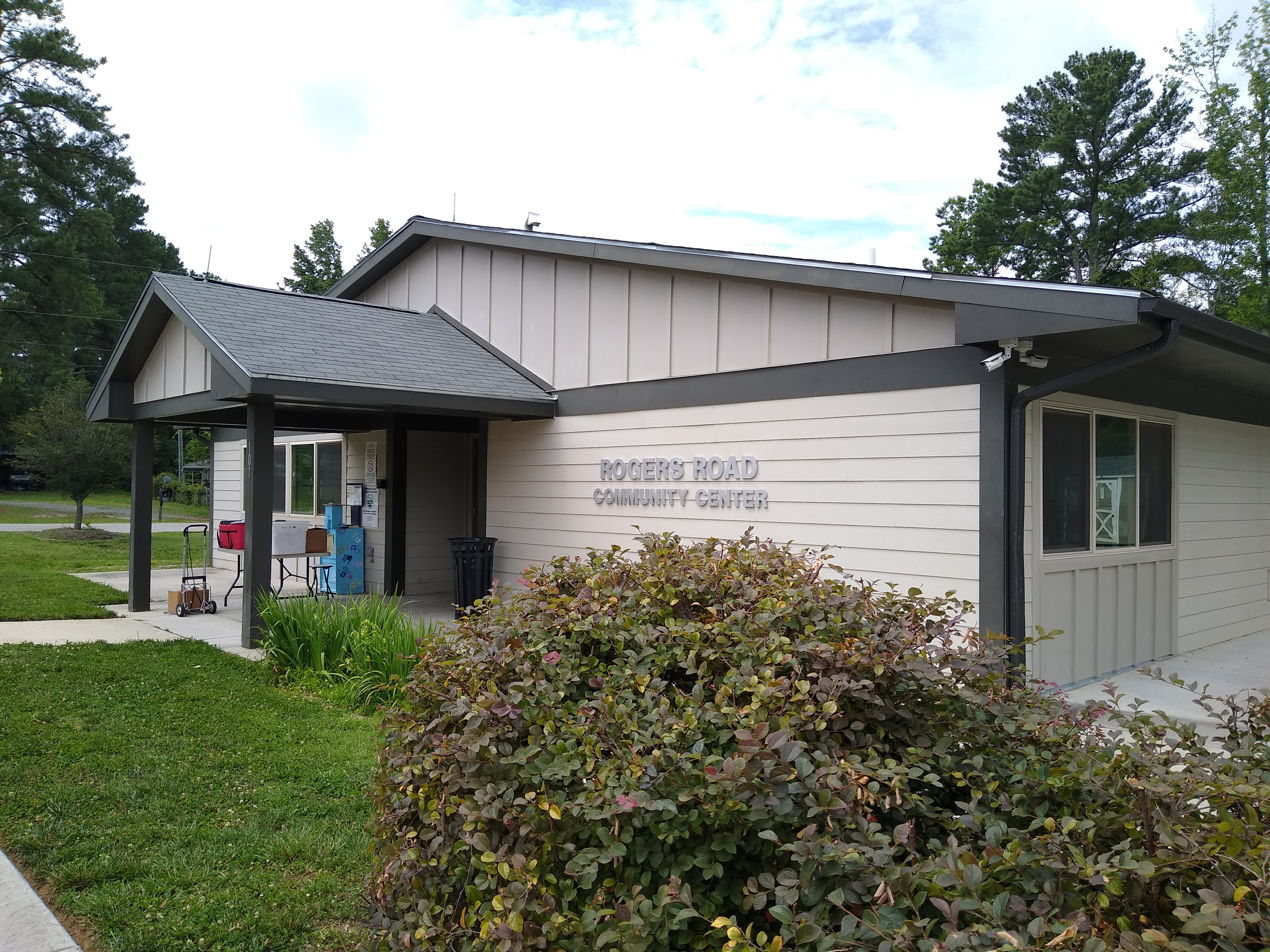
Rogers Road Community Center

Rogers Road is a community located in Orange County, North Carolina, United States. It is well known for its history of environmental injustice and battles thereagainst.

== History ==
Since the mid-19th century, the Rogers-Eubanks Community has been home to many African-American families. A great deal of the black-owned family farmland in this area has been passed down throughout the generations. Rogers Road was originally a wagon-track in the late 19th century, and Eubanks Road contained a small school founded by a former slave. The school provided an education for the neighborhood's black children in a time when they had no such opportunities. In current times, the Rogers-Eubanks Community has maintained its rich culture despite being the host to mainly low-income households. The social bonds among the families that formed their roots over 100 years ago have been crucial to the ability of the residents to battle the county and achieve environmental equality.

An organization called Play Street Soccer, an affiliate of the Chapel Hill and Carrboro Human Rights Center, also hosts pick up soccer games for the youth of the area once each week. The organization began hosting games in the spring of 2011 with the hope of empowering children and building community through soccer.

== Dumping disputes ==
=== Orange County's growing problem ===
From 1939 to 1979, many new families moved into this historically small neighborhood, buying houses and land and establishing themselves in the area surrounding Rogers Road. Just like most of Orange County at the time, the Rogers-Eubanks Community was moving away from being a small group of tight-knit families and moving toward rapid expansion. Aside from changing the nature of the community, there was one other problem that the county was not well-prepared to solve: garbage. More people equals more garbage, but in the 1970s, the political scene was active and a lot of change was beginning to happen. Along with the formation of the United States Environmental Protection Agency (EPA) in December 1970, the American people were becoming concerned with inflation, racial tensions, conservation, and pollution. This new-found national interest in preserving the environment "called into question the common practice of burning household waste and disposing of waste into…waterways." All of these national concerns were equally existent in Orange County. The issue of race was prominent in Orange High School where many black students were accused of "carrying weapons, insulting white female students, and passing out literature" at school. The school emblem was changed from the "black panther" and ' 'Dixie' ' was no longer allowed to be played at the school's football games due to its racial associations.

=== The promises of Howard Lee and Orange County, 1970 ===
The county was still in need of a place to put its rapidly growing volume of refuse. The mayor at the time was a man named Howard Lee. Howard Lee was elected in 1969 and was the first African-American to be elected as mayor in a southern, mostly white area since reconstruction. In 1970, the Orange County Board of County Commissioners (BOCC) discussed a solution to the growing waste problem as the county's existing landfills were nearing capacity more and more each day. The search for a piece of land on which to locate the new landfill began in 1971. Various sites were considered and the initial decision had been to locate the landfill in Chestnut Ridge, but at some point between June 8 and June 29, 1972, the site was dropped and changed to a site on Eubanks Road (then State Road 1727) where it still remains. Despite his plans and promises to "prevent zoning decisions from being influenced by considerations of wealth, race, or political influence", Lee was under the pressures of time, progress, and space, making it difficult to ensure that every consideration was met.
There was a great deal of protest before the landfill was built on the Eubanks Road site by both individual citizens and community groups. One such group was the New Hope Improvement Association, an organization led by John L. Kline that consisted of roughly 500 members living in the area surrounding the proposed site. Lawyer B.B. Olive from Durham aided the group in their struggle. Although the team failed to prevent the construction of the landfill, Olive is remembered as one of the biggest advocates against it.
The County Commissioners were at a loss after losing Chestnut Ridge as an option and now facing opposition and protest from the residents living near the site on Eubanks Road. After a denial of the rezoning of the site from "residential" to "rural industrial", the New Hope Improvement Association was energized and tried to strengthen the force against the landfill's creation on Eubanks Road by filing a legal complaint against the county. Right before this legal battle was to be fought, Mayor Howard Lee visited the community and said: "We want to put a landfill out here. To do it, we're going to pave your road. When the landfill is full, we're going to turn it into a recreation center for you." Having convinced the families that this may be beneficial, Lee singlehandedly weakened his opposition and eventually, despite the community being one that was "strongly opposed to having a landfill near them", the unlined landfill was built on 80 acres (320,000 m^{2}) of land on Eubanks Road in 1972.

=== Widening the divide ===
In late 1980s, the county announced that there would be an expansion of the landfill rather than the promised shutdown and recreational facilities. David Caldwell, Judy Nunn Snipes, and B.B. Olive led a new activist group in the 90s in response to the proposed actions and demanded a shutdown of the landfill and compensation for having hosted the facility for the promised number of years. The county had known almost a decade earlier in the late 70s that the need to expand would be an issue in future years. Once the citizens were informed, there was internal debate among citizens and officials within the county. Many arguments of the injustice were made, and the residents of the Rogers Road coalition believed that the areas creating the waste were not the ones hosting the facilities for that waste, a fact that they hoped would change.

=== What now? ===
Many of the black residents felt as though they had been completely neglected by the government and betrayed and fooled by their mayor, the person who was supposed to be their advocate, not their enemy. One of the main reasons the dump hadn't been located in Chestnut Ridge was to avoid creating dangers for the children who attended a nearby year-round camp, yet so many families in the Rogers-Eubanks community feel that their neighborhood is family-oriented aside from the landfill and that their children's health is being negatively affected. Upon hearing that the government was planning on placing a new facility in the same area, the citizens were outraged. In March 2006, the county's Solid Waste Advisory Board officially recommended the Eubanks Road site as the location of the new solid waste transfer station.
Having already temporarily expanded the existing landfill and ignored the people's requests for amenities, the local town governments proceeded to go behind the backs of the citizens in the Rogers Road community and give the county both control of the landfill and 60 more acres of land for the siting of a solid waste transfer station. The families in this area had already been dealing with increased truck traffic, landfill odor, deteriorating water quality, and unwanted visits from buzzards, rats, and stray dogs searching for food in the county's trash for many years, and feel that it is unfair to bear it any longer. The commissioners in Orange County have responded to the uproar from the Rogers Road residents and promised to reconsider the site, but they have yet to promise to completely wipe the Eubanks Road site off the list of possibilities. Many people in the area worry about their ancestral property. The planned facility is expected to cost $4.7 million.

== Water shortage ==
The landfill, although modern for the time, was not constructed in a way that kept the area safe from the toxins and waste that leached into the ground of the surrounding area. Tests conducted in the early months of 2010 showed that only two of the eleven wells in the Rogers Road area are supplying the area's residents with water "within the EPA recommended limits".
Water lines were eventually laid in the area but did not reach all the way down Rogers Road, and for many families, the hook-up fees that ran up costs of about $2,000 were out of the price range for many citizens in the area. The sewer hook-up fees were even more expensive, reaching about $3,000 per household. Despite the program set up by the county to give assistance to homeowners unable to afford these costs, many either could not afford the water bills that followed or did not fall low enough on the income bracket to be considered in need.
In February 2010, Orange County Board of Commissioners unanimously passed a resolution that is expected to plan a way to provide safe and clean water options for households located within 3,000 feet (910 m) of the landfill. If the plan comes to fruition, possible solutions include fixing and replacing existing wells or give the residents access to the county's public water supply by extending the lines. The residents seem hopeful that the government will choose to extend the water supply rather than simply repair the wells.

=== Possible health hazards ===
People in the neighborhood have questioned the safety of the water since shortly after the landfill was first built in the 70s. Many noticed their loved ones coming down with cancer among other sicknesses and a change of the color of the water in which their families drank, cooked with, and bathed in. The government denied any allegations from the start that it was a result of the landfill and as a result felt no obligation to give them the amenities which they lacked.
Contaminants have been found in tests done on some of the wells in the area around the Orange County Regional Landfill. Vinyl Chloride, tetrachloroethylene, dichloroethene, and benzene are all chemicals that could cause health problems in high doses. The concentration of vinyl chloride was found to be 16 mg/L when the regulations state the acceptable range to be 0.002 mg/L-0.015 mg/L. Dichloroethene also exceeds the standards, found at a concentration of 232 mg/L when the accepted level falls at 70 mg/L. Additionally, the benzene was discovered to exist at a level of 7 mg/L when it should not be any greater than 1 mg/L. The health effects of these chemicals are said to be dangerous if long-term exposure occurs. Lack of data to prove that the chemicals have affected the health is what maintains the rift between the beliefs of the citizens and those of the local government.

== Government involvement ==
The government has been trying to make amends in recent years, but many residents of the area see these changes as superficial attempts at "patching" the problem and not really fixing the source of all of the issues that the area faces.
A huge problem with the legislation is that Rogers Road has only some parts within city limits but other parts are transition areas between Carrboro and Chapel Hill known as "extraterritorial planning jurisdiction." This has allowed for a great deal of neglect as no one wants to take responsibility for the area that is not within the drawn city lines.
In December 2006, the town of Chapel Hill began developing the Rogers Road Small Area Plan. This plan is designed to provide a "more detailed look at the impacts of providing public services in the area, especially the extension of sanitary sewer, and the impacts of developing an affordable housing site." It also serves as an outlet to analyze "desirable land uses and revision to the land use plan water and sewer extension plan, roadway network, bicycle and pedestrian facilities plan, transit service plan, zoning ordinance and map amendment." This plan affects the Greene Tract, an area containing Chapel Hill, Carrboro, and other parts of Orange County. Many residents fear the loss of ancestral property in relation to this plan as well.
Related government action has started to be taken to aid communities like the Rogers-Eubanks Community. In September 2007, Senator Hillary Clinton introduced a bill titled the Environmental Justice Renewal Act. Despite the efforts to aid poverty-struck areas, some advocates, like African American Environmentalist Association (AAEA) president Norris McDonald, feel that bills like the EJRA are insufficient and just strategic political moves to gain votes.
The idea that this was an instance of racial discrimination really started to flourish in the first decade of the 21st century. In Oct 2007, Reverend Robert Campbell, "one of the town's leading activists for environmental justice in the Rogers Road community" filed a complaint with the EPA in reference to the Rogers-Eubanks Community claiming that county officials had "violated Title VI of the Civil Rights Act of 1964" and the regulations set by the EPA that prohibited discrimination. The mention of the lengthy history of such behavior, groundwater contamination, and the lack of sewer and water lines were also discussed.
Reverend Campbell's complaint that he filed "with the Department of Justice about the siting of the transfer station" is not agreed upon by local government officials. The county's commissioner Barry Jacobs said that the decision was in no way a matter of racial or socioeconomic discrimination and that he is "thinking about" considering other sites. Having gained a great deal of national attention, the Rogers-Eubanks community coalition ensure that it became an issue in the 2007 elections, hoping that incoming politicians will see it as an issue needing repair.
Reverend Robert Campbell was invited to the "Obama Administration's green energy table" and went in hopes of gaining a commitment for federal stimulus money to improve the water and air quality of his neighborhood. He traveled to the White House and spoke to EPA Administrator Lisa Jackson and Department of Health and Human Services Secretary Kathleen Sebelius about the issues facing the Rogers-Eubanks Community. Hoping to influence policy change, discuss a national campaign for reducing, reusing, and recycling, and the suggest the expansion of testing and forming infrastructure, Rev. Campbell had great hopes for the meeting after the great response to the grant he had submitted to the EPA. The Reverend feels that if money were available, the issues of air, sewage, and water could be dealt with properly.

== Rogers-Eubanks "Coalition to End Environmental Racism" (CEER) ==
Founded in 2007, the Rogers-Eubanks Coalition to End Environmental Racism, often abbreviated as CEER, has a three part mission. The first part is to undo the recent decision of Orange County to locate a new waste transfer center in their community. The second is to restore just health and safety in the areas surrounding the Orange County Landfill. The third part of their mission is to make heard the concerns of local residents, and to provide them with healthy and safe water.
The group was brought together through grass roots efforts, yet in the two and a half years since it was founded, many other organizations have taken an interest to the cause. Some of these include the Chapel Hill/Carrboro branch of the NAACP, the Women's league of Peace and Freedom and the students and faculty of the University of North Carolina. Like almost any other environmental justice movement, the involvement of outside groups is likely to continue to be a huge aid in the fight for the Rogers-Eubanks Community against Orange County and its new waste transfer station.

=== Ineffective to influential? ===
On September 20, 2007, this mission was very clearly laid out in a memorandum from the Solid Waste Director to the County manager over a span of approximately fourteen months. After five meetings, the Rogers-Eubanks community had twenty-six points on their "Wish List for Enhancement". These points are quite varied but not the least bit unreasonable, such as finding an alternate site for the Waste Transfer Station, provide municipal water for those who did not get it the first time, reduce the odor surrounding us, and stop dividing Rover-Eubanks as a community.
In the September 24, 2007 issue of the Daily Tar Heel, a resident of the Rogers-Eubanks community was quoted saying, "Most of us feel we're not being heard," and that they, "just aren't getting a strong feel that what we're saying is going to make a difference." However that Thursday, more than 40 residents and members of CEER attended the Assembly of Government meeting, where it is usually policy to not let representatives speak. However at this meeting, Neloa Jones was given the floor and allowed to make a speech about the promises that had been broken for the past thirty-five years. During her heartfelt speech, Jones was quoted saying, "I don't know if people understand what it's like to live beside a landfill for 35 years." This statement brings a lot into perspective, reminding outsiders that the garbage is not just an inconvenience; it is a huge detriment to the quality of life of members of the Rogers Road community.
"I guess all that noise we've been making, somebody listened," said the Rev. Robert Campbell on Saturday November 14, in reference to his invitation to the White House. He had a chance to discuss the environmental and physical health of his community with EPA Administrator Lisa Jackson and Department of Health and Human Services Secretary Kathleen Sebelius. The Reverend was invited because he is one of the co-founders / co-chairs of CEER, is a prominent figure in the environmental justice movement and is president of the Rogers-Eubanks Neighborhood Association. He says the main issue with his community is lack of funding, and his goal is to get more funding so more positive steps can be taken to clean up the Rogers-Eubanks community.
However, despite the recent change to these positive events, the water quality of the poor neighborhoods in the Rogers Road community is as bad as ever. According to a recent water and ground test, 9 of the 11 wells servicing the community are contaminated and do not meet EPA standards. For over thirty-five years the citizens have been fighting the filth put into their community, and it appears that their struggle is not over yet.

=== Coalition officers & committee chairs ===
- Neloa Jones – Co-Chair
- Rev. Robert Campbell – Co-Chair
- Jack Sanders – Strategic Planning Committee Chair
- Stan Cheren – Communications Chair
- Barbara Hopkins – Secretary
