= Brunswick-Topsham Land Trust =

Conservation group in Maine

- Abbreviation: BTLT
- Founded: 1985 (41 years ago)
- Type: Nonprofit
- Headquarters: Brunswick, Maine, U.S.
- Location: U.S.
- Services: Conservation
- Executive Director: Steve Walker
- Website: https://www.btlt.org/

The Brunswick-Topsham Land Trust (abbreviated BTLT) is a volunteer-run conservation group based in Brunswick, Maine, United States. Established in 1985 and funded by its members, it owns many preserves and trail networks, and has assisted in the creation of town-owned parks and preserves. The trust, one of eighty land trusts in Maine, covers the towns of Brunswick, Topsham and Bowdoin.

The trust's executive director is Steve Walker, while its president is Emily Swan.

== History ==
Since 1985, the trust has conserved over 3,100 acres (1,300 ha) of land.

== Properties ==
As of 2024, the trust owns the following 44 conservation lands:

Brunswick:

- 250th Park
- Bunganuc Woods
- Chase Reserve
- Coleman Farm
- Coombs Property
- Crystal Spring Farm
- Dunbar Property
- Howard Point Property
- Larrabee Farm
- Lower Coombs Island
- Maquoit Bay Conservation Land
- Morse Farm
- Mountfort Farm
- Neptune Woods
- Packard Farm
- Peggy Coffin Pond Preserve
- Pennell Brothers – Coffin Preserve
- Pennelleville Meadow
- Simpson Farm
- Skolfield Preserve
- Stoddard Property
- Upper Coombs Island
- Woodward Cove
- Woodward Point Preserve

Topsham:

- Alora Drive
- Androscoggin Woods
- Bradley Pond Farm Preserve
- Cary Property
- Cathance River Nature Preserve
- Cow Island
- Fairwinds Farm
- Head of Tide Farm
- Head of Tide Park
- Little River Preserve
- Mill Forest
- Muddy River Property
- Odell Property
- Perry Property
- Ricker-Scammon Farm
- Robert Williams’ Preserve
- Rogers Property
- Smart Property
- Tarbox Preserve

Bowdoin:

- Dow Property

== See also ==
- List of environmental and conservation organizations in the United States
