= Maine Coast Heritage Trust =

- Abbreviation: MCHT
- Formation: 1970 (56 years ago)
- Founded: 1970
- Type: Nonprofit organization
- Purpose: Land conservation and coastal preservation
- Headquarters: Maine, United States
- Location(s): Topsham, Mount Desert Island, Rockport & Whiting, Maine
- Key people: Executive Directors, Presidents and CEOs over the years: Elmer Beal, Jr.; Robert O. Binnewies; Jay Espy; Tim Glidden; Kate Stookey
- Website: https://www.mcht.org/

The Maine Coast Heritage Trust is a nonprofit land conservation organization. Its conservation partner is the Maine Land Trust Network, which is one of its programs.

== Formation ==
In 1969, Margaret Rockefeller learned from the staff at Acadia National Park that conservation easements could be used to protect the natural scenery of islands in a portion of the Gulf of Maine from Penobscot Bay to Schoodic Point. A precedent for this conservation action existed along the 469-mile Blue Ridge Parkway in the Appalachian Highlands of Virginia and North Carolina where conservation easements had been acquired in the 1930s-40s by the National Park Service to preserve natural scenery.

With the encouragement of her husband, David Rockefeller, and participation by Thomas Dudley Cabot, Margaret Rockefeller formed the nonprofit Maine Coast Heritage Trust in 1970 to assist island owners who might choose to donate conservation easements to Acadia National Park. The name for the organization was recommended by Robert Orville Anderson; Jane Boardman designed the MCHT logo; Anne Morrow Lindbergh provided wording for the first MCHT brochure. Elmer Beal, Jr., a native of Mount Desert Island, was hired as Executive Director. In the first year of operation, thirty conservation easements were donated by island-owners to Acadia National Park. The MCHT subsequently formed alliances with additional public and private organizations and expanded its activities to include the entire Maine Coast.

In 1982, the Maine Coast Heritage Trust co-founded the nationwide Land Trust Alliance. In 1985, the MCHT acquired the 193-acre Witherle Woods Preserve, the first of many preserves, such as the Stone Barn Farm, acquired to provide coastal access and preserve natural habitat.

== Conservation progress ==
By the 1980s, the Trust was considered to be one of the country's most significant land trusts, and by 1996, when Rockefeller died, the Trust had protected more than 66,000 acres (27,000 hectares) of land which included 173 islands and 250 miles (400 km) of coastline. On locations such as Malaga Island, the Trust also protected the cultural history of the region.

On the 50th anniversary of the Maine Coast Heritage Trust in 2020, it listed 329 whole islands protected by conservation easements and 148 preserves available for public access, a combined total of 156,000+ acres including 99 miles of trail. Among projects pursued in 2021, the MCHT successfully acted to acquire and preserve Little Whaleboat Island (22-acres), Sheep Island (59-acres), Monroe Island (225-acres), and 1,700 acres of wildland on the Schoodic Peninsula.

Other areas of focus include Penobscot Bay, Yarmouth, Machias Bay, Casco Bay.

== Leadership ==
Founding Board members included: Margarent M. "Peggy" Rockefeller, Thomas D. Cabot, and Robert O. Binnewies. Binnewies subsequently resigned from the Board to succeed Elmer Beal, Jr., as MCHT Executive Director.
