= Chesapeake Bay Commission =

Advisory body

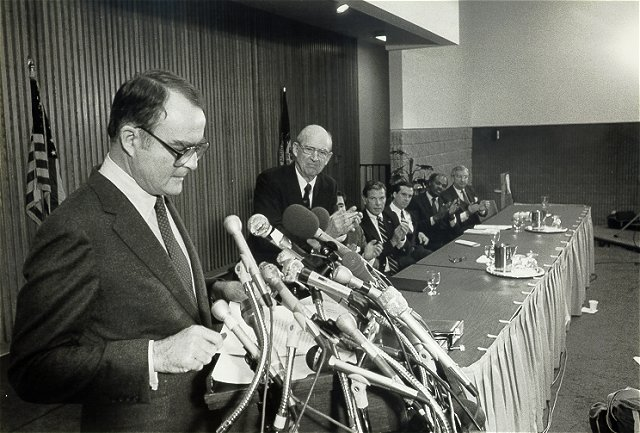
EPA Administrator William Ruckelshaus addressing a Chesapeake Bay Commission conference on December 9, 1983. The 1983 Chesapeake Bay Agreement was signed at the conference.

The Chesapeake Bay Commission is an advisory body that consults with the legislatures of Maryland, Virginia and Pennsylvania about environmental, economic and social issues related to the Chesapeake Bay. The commission is a signatory to all agreements on matters regarding the bay, and advises Congress on bay-related issues. The commission was established under state law in 1980 by the states of Maryland and Virginia. Pennsylvania joined the commission in 1985. Since its inception, the commission has led the adoption of hundreds of federal, multi-state, and state policies and laws in order to improve the environment of the bay.

The commission was a signatory to the Chesapeake Bay Agreement of 1983, which was also signed by the governors of Maryland, Virginia and Pennsylvania; the Mayor of the District of Columbia; and the Administrator of the United States Environmental Protection Agency (EPA). The agreement recognized the need for a cooperative approach among the various governmental jurisdictions to address pollution problems in the bay, and established the Chesapeake Bay Program, an inter-agency partnership of federal and state agencies, academic institutions, citizen groups and non-governmental organizations.

In 2000, the commission was a signatory to the Chesapeake 2000 Agreement, which was also signed for the Commonwealth of Virginia, the states of Maryland and Pennsylvania, the District of Columbia, and the United States of America. This more comprehensive agreement committed these signatories to future restoration actions to reduce pollution, restore habitat, protect the bay's resources, improve land use practices, and community engagement. This agreement laid out 102 commitments and goals to work to achieve within the decade and reaffirmed their previous commitments to past Chesapeake Bay Agreements.

The commission membership consists of state legislators, state cabinet secretaries and citizen representatives. As of 2023, the chair of the commission is Scott Martin, State Senator of Pennsylvania. The full commission meets quarterly, and staff maintain offices in Annapolis, Maryland; Richmond, Virginia; and Harrisburg, Pennsylvania.

== See also ==
- Chesapeake Bay Program – regional inter-agency partnership
