= Play Street Soccer =

US non-profit organization

Play Street Soccer is a non-profit organization based in Carrboro, North Carolina. The organization began as an on-site program of the Chapel Hill and Carrboro Human Rights Center under the leadership of coach John Mulholland in 2010. Originally, Coach Mulholland taught soccer lessons to children living in the Abbey Court Apartments, historically an apartment complex for low-income families. Since its beginning, Play Street Soccer has now grown to host pick-up soccer games at three low-income neighborhoods in Chapel Hill and Carrboro through the efforts of UNC student, Carey Averbook. Games are held at Abbey Court Apartments, Rogers Road, and Estes Park apartments throughout the week during the fall and spring. Volunteers from The University of North Carolina at Chapel Hill help facilitate the games as part of various service-learning classes offered at the institution.

Play Street Soccer's mission is to bring soccer to communities where most children can't travel to club teams. In addition, the organization hopes to bring together the children and parents of each community through friendly competition. By having the children self-officiate, Play Street Soccer hopes to instill ideals responsibility, teamwork, and cooperation in its participants in addition to positively affecting the children's physical and mental wellness. By involving college students, the pick-up games can also provide positive role models for the community members.
