= Environmental Integrity Project =

- Abbreviation: EIP
- Formation: 2002
- Founders: Eric Schaeffer, Michele Merkel
- Type: 501(c)(3) non-profit
- Purpose: Environmental Advocacy
- Headquarters: Washington, D.C.
- Website: http://environmentalintegrity.org/

The Environmental Integrity Project (EIP) is a Washington, D.C.–based environmental nonprofit organization that advocates for more effective enforcement of environmental laws. The organization was founded in 2002 by former U.S. Environmental Protection Agency (EPA) attorneys Eric V. Schaeffer and Michele Merkel. EIP is known for its legal and investigative efforts to reduce air and water pollution from coal-fired power plants, oil and gas facilities, factory farms, and other sources including incinerators and waste water treatment plants. The group also focuses on environmental justice and pollution in the Chesapeake Bay. EIP is headquartered in Washington, DC, and it has another office in Austin, Texas, and staff in Pennsylvania, Vermont, and Georgia. In 2013, Charity Navigator, an independent charity evaluator, rated EIP as a four-star charity organization.

EIP maintains Ashtracker.org, a website that provides records about groundwater contamination at coal ash dumps. The site relies on industry-reported data from state and company records.

== Mission ==
The Environmental Integrity Project’s objectives are as follow:

1. To provide objective analysis of how the failure to enforce or implement environmental laws increases pollution and affects the public's health;
2. To hold federal and state agencies, as well as individual corporations, accountable for failing to enforce or comply with environmental laws;
3. To help local communities in key states obtain the protection of environmental laws.”

== See also ==
- List of environmental and conservation organizations in the United States
- Environmental law
