= List of environmental organizations in the Sacramento region of California =

List of environmental organizations in the Sacramento region of California

- California Native Plant Society (CNPS)
- Cosumnes River Preserve (CRP)
- African American Environmentalist Association (AAEA)
