= Carbon180 =

Environmental nonprofit organization

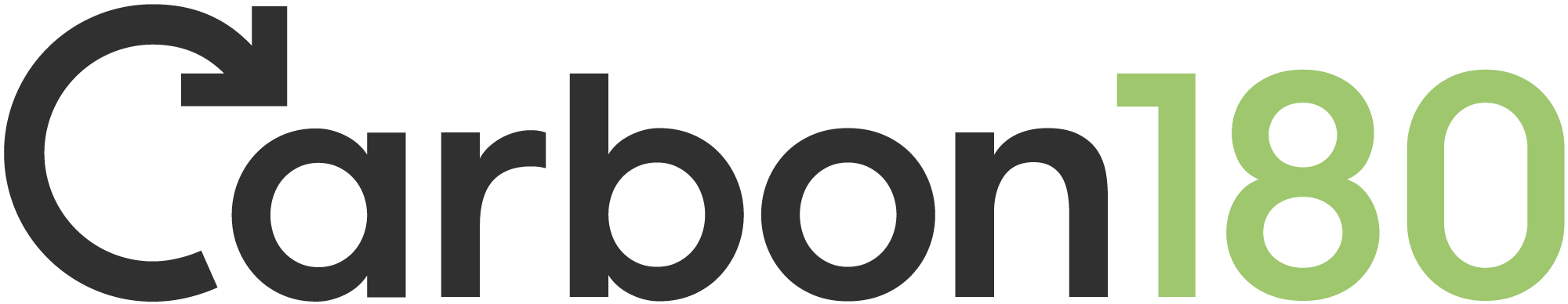
- Formation: 2015
- Founder: Noah Deich and Giana Amador
- Founded at: Berkeley, California
- Legal status: 501(c)(3) organization
- Headquarters: Washington, D.C.
- President: Noah Deich
- Website: carbon180.org

Carbon180 is a nonprofit environmental organization headquartered in Washington, D.C. In 2015, Giana Amador and Noah Deich co-founded the organization at the University of California, Berkeley. Carbon180 advocates for carbon dioxide removal solutions, including, but not limited to, direct air capture (DAC), forest carbon removal, and agricultural soil carbon. Carbon180 engages with lawmakers, academic and science-based institutions, and businesses to fund and deploy carbon removal technologies and methods.

== History ==
Launched in 2015 at the University of California, Berkeley, Carbon180 was formerly known as the Center for Carbon Removal until 2018. In 2017, the Center created the New Carbon Economy Consortium with research universities and national labs to conduct research, share knowledge, and build out pathways to deploy and scale carbon removal solutions. Also in 2017, the Center helped advocate for amendments to the Section 45Q tax credit, specifically to include projects that involve DAC. The tax credit passed in the 2018 Bipartisan Budget Act. In 2018, Carbon180 retained Cassidy and Associates for a short time and in 2020, retained the Coefficient Group to lobby and engage with congressional offices on climate legislation.

Carbon180 has received the attention of celebrities as Grimes, Halsey, and Odesza have all pledged to donate a percentage of their NFT proceeds to the organization. Grimes has pledged a portion of her proceeds from physical artwork as well.

== Activities ==
Carbon180's main activities pertain to federal policy advocacy, the New Carbon Economy Consortium, and the Leading with Soil Initiative. The organization also provides fact sheets and deep dives describing various approaches to carbon removal.

=== Federal policy advocacy ===
The nonprofit supports legislation related to carbon dioxide removal, such as H.R.7434 – Federal Carbon Dioxide Removal Leadership Act of 2022, and is advocating for carbon removal solutions (e.g., soil carbon) as the U.S. Congress considers the 2023 Farm Bill. Carbon180 recently shared its outlook for DAC implementation with the U.S. Department of Energy as the agency moves forward with the Regional Direct Air Capture Hubs program.

=== New Carbon Economy Consortium ===
Launched in 2017, the Consortium includes representatives from the Lawrence Livermore National Laboratory, National Renewable Energy Laboratory, Arizona State University, University of Wyoming, Colorado State University, Columbia University, Cornell University, Howard University, Purdue University, University of British Columbia, University of California, Berkeley, University of Wyoming, Worcester Polytechnic Institute, Global CO_{2} Initiative, and Carbon180. The Consortium has hosted workshops to outline and develop a multi-disciplinary research agenda to understand the human, environmental, and economic implications of a new carbon economy.

=== Leading with Soil Initiative ===
Carbon180 views soil carbon sequestration as a viable climate solution and has published a report entitled, Soil Carbon Moonshot: Grounding Carbon Storage in Science, which proposes a $2.3 billion interagency effort to research and scale soil carbon practices.

== See also ==
- Carbon dioxide removal
- Carbon capture and storage
- Carbon sequestration
- Carbon offset
- Climate change mitigation
- Direct air capture
- Soil carbon
