= Eyak Preservation Council =

American conservation organization

- Abbreviation: EPC
- Formation: 1989
- Founder: Dune Lankard
- Type: Nonprofit
- Tax ID no.: 68-0424723
- Legal status: 501(c)(3)
- Purpose: Conservation, Salmon, Eyak people
- Headquarters: Cordova, Alaska
- Board President: Dune Lankard
- Executive Director / Co-founder: Carol Hoover
- Main organ: Executive Director, Board of Directors, Advisory Council
- Website: https://eyakpreservationcouncil.org/

The Eyak Preservation Council (EPC) is a non-profit organization based in Cordova, Alaska whose mission is to protect wild salmon habitat, indigenous Eyak culture, natural habitat, and fish and wildlife of the Copper River Delta and Prince William Sound. It was conceived in 1989 following the March 24, 1989 Exxon Valdez oil spill and became a 501c3 organization in 2000.

On its official website, EPC defines its mission as the following: “To honor Eyak heritage and to conserve wild salmon culture and habitat through education, awareness and the promotion of sustainable lifeways for all people.”

EPC has a full-time staff of two, an advisory council, and a board of directors.
