= Eclipse process framework =

The Eclipse process framework (EPF) is an open source project that is managed by the Eclipse Foundation. It lies under the top-level Eclipse Technology Project, and has two goals:

- To provide an extensible framework and exemplary tools for software process engineering - method and process authoring, library management, configuring and publishing a process.
- To provide exemplary and extensible process content for a range of software development and management processes supporting iterative, agile, and incremental development, and applicable to a broad set of development platforms and applications. For instance, EPF provides the OpenUP, an agile software development process optimized for small projects.

By using EPF Composer, engineers can create their own software development process by structuring it using a predefined schema. This schema is an evolution of the SPEM 1.1 OMG specification referred to as the unified method architecture (UMA). Major parts of UMA went into the adopted revision of SPEM, SPEM 2.0. EPF is aiming to fully support SPEM 2.0 in the near future. The UMA and SPEM schemata support the organization of large amounts of descriptions for development methods and processes. Such method content and processes do not have to be limited to software engineering, but can also cover other design and engineering disciplines, such as mechanical engineering, business transformation, and sales cycles.

IBM supplies a commercial version, IBM Rational Method Composer.

== Limitations ==
The "content variability" capability severely limits users to one-to-one mappings. Processes trying to integrate various aspects may require block-copy-paste style clones to get around this limitation. This may be a limitation of the SPEM model and might be based on presumption that agile methods are being described as these methods tend not to have deep dependencies.

== See also ==
- Meta-process modeling
