= McHenry County Conservation District =

Public land management agency in Illinois

Agency overview
- Formed: July 1971
- Headquarters: 18410 US Highway 14; Woodstock, Illinois
- Agency executives: Elizabeth S. Kessler, Executive Director; David Kranz, Board President; Vern Scacci, Board Vice President
- Website: www.mccdistrict.org

The McHenry County Conservation District (MCCD) is a conservation district located in McHenry County, Illinois, United States.

MCCD was founded in 1971 and manages and maintains approximately 25,000 acres of land throughout the county. This includes parks, conservation areas, campgrounds, bicycle trails, hiking trails, and horse trails.

== Managed sites ==
The following locations are directly managed by MCCD:

Name	Land Area (acres)
Alden Sedge Meadow	192
Beck's Woods	283
Boger Bog	38
Boone Creek	608
Brookdale	1,645
Coral Woods	775
Dufield Pond	78
Elizabeth Lake Nature Preserve & Varga Archeological Site	345
Exner Marsh	220
Fel Pro RRR	277
Fox Bluff	279
Glacial Park	3,412
Goose Lake Conservation Area	169
Harrison Benwell	75
Hebron Peatlands	185
Hickory Grove & Lions Prairie and Marsh	411
High Point Conservation Area	253
The Hollows	478
Kishwaukee Headquarters	153
Lake in the Hills Fen	400
Marengo Ridge	818
North Branch	521
Pioneer Fen Conservation Area	47
Pleasant Valley	2,080
Queen Anne Prairie Conservation Area	906
Rush Creek	726
Silver Creek	840
Spring Grove Conservation Area	0.5
Stickney Run	629
Winding Creek	631
