= Royal River Conservation Trust =

Conservation group in Maine, United States

- Abbreviation: RRCT
- Founded: 1988 (38 years ago)
- Type: Nonprofit
- Headquarters: Yarmouth, Maine
- Location: U.S.
- Region served: Southern Maine
- Services: Conservation
- Executive Director: Chris Franklin
- Website: https://www.rrct.org

The Royal River Conservation Trust (RRCT) is a volunteer-run conservation group based in Yarmouth, Maine, United States. Established in 1988 and funded by its members, it owns many preserves and trail networks, and has assisted in the creation of town-owned parks and preserves, state parks and state wildlife-management areas. The trust, one of eighty land trusts in Maine, covers seven towns and cities in Androscoggin County and Cumberland County which form the watershed of the Royal River: Yarmouth, North Yarmouth, Pownal, New Gloucester, Gray, Durham and Auburn.

The trust's executive director is Chris Franklin, while its president is Emily Sneath Jones.

== History ==
The trust was formed as a result of a group named the Friends of the Royal River and land trusts in Yarmouth, Pownal, North Yarmouth and New Gloucester.

== Properties ==
- Elmwood Trails
- Chandler Brook Preserve - Conservation Easement
- Dunn's Depot Trail - Conservation Easement
- Dédəbonsagk Preserve
- Fels–Grove Farm Preserve - Conservation Easement
- Fern Hollow Preserve
- Flowing North Preserve
- Granite Falls Preserve
- Intervale Preserve
- Little Meadow Preserve
- Knight's Pond Preserve - Conservation Easement
- Littlejohn Island Preserve
- Long Hill Road Preserve
- Mèmak Preserve
- Old Harris Road Preserve
- Pisgah Hill Preserve
- River Elf Trail - Conservation Easement
- Riverfront Woods Preserve - Conservation Easement
- Chesley Meadows Preserve
- Skyline Farm - Conservation Easement
- Spear Farm Estuary Preserve - Conservation Easement
- Thayer Brook Preserve
- Thoits Branch Headwaters Preserve
- Thurston Wildlife Marsh

== See also ==
- List of environmental and conservation organizations in the United States
