= Wyoming Wilderness Association =

American non-profit organization

- Abbreviation: WWA
- Formation: 1979; 47 years ago
- Type: Nonprofit
- Tax ID no.: 38-3667856
- Legal status: 501(c)(3)
- Headquarters: Sheridan, Wyoming
- Members: >700 (2012)
- Governing Council President: Bill Voigt
- Executive Director: Khale Century Reno
- Website: https://www.wildwyo.org

The Wyoming Wilderness Association is an American non-governmental, not-for-profit working to protect Wyoming's wild public lands through wilderness designations. WWA was founded in 1979 by a group of wilderness advocates and outdoors people who envisioned the first Wyoming Wilderness Act. In 2003, WWA grew again with an opportunity to protect additional wild watersheds, intact ecosystems, old-growth forests, wildlife habitat, and wildlife migration corridors. As of 2012, the organization has over 700 members with offices in Sheridan, Buffalo, Lander, Dubois, and Jackson Wyoming.

On February 10, 2012, The Wyoming Wilderness Association celebrated its 10th anniversary advocating for more wilderness in Wyoming.
