= Chebeague & Cumberland Land Trust =

Conservation group in Maine, U.S.

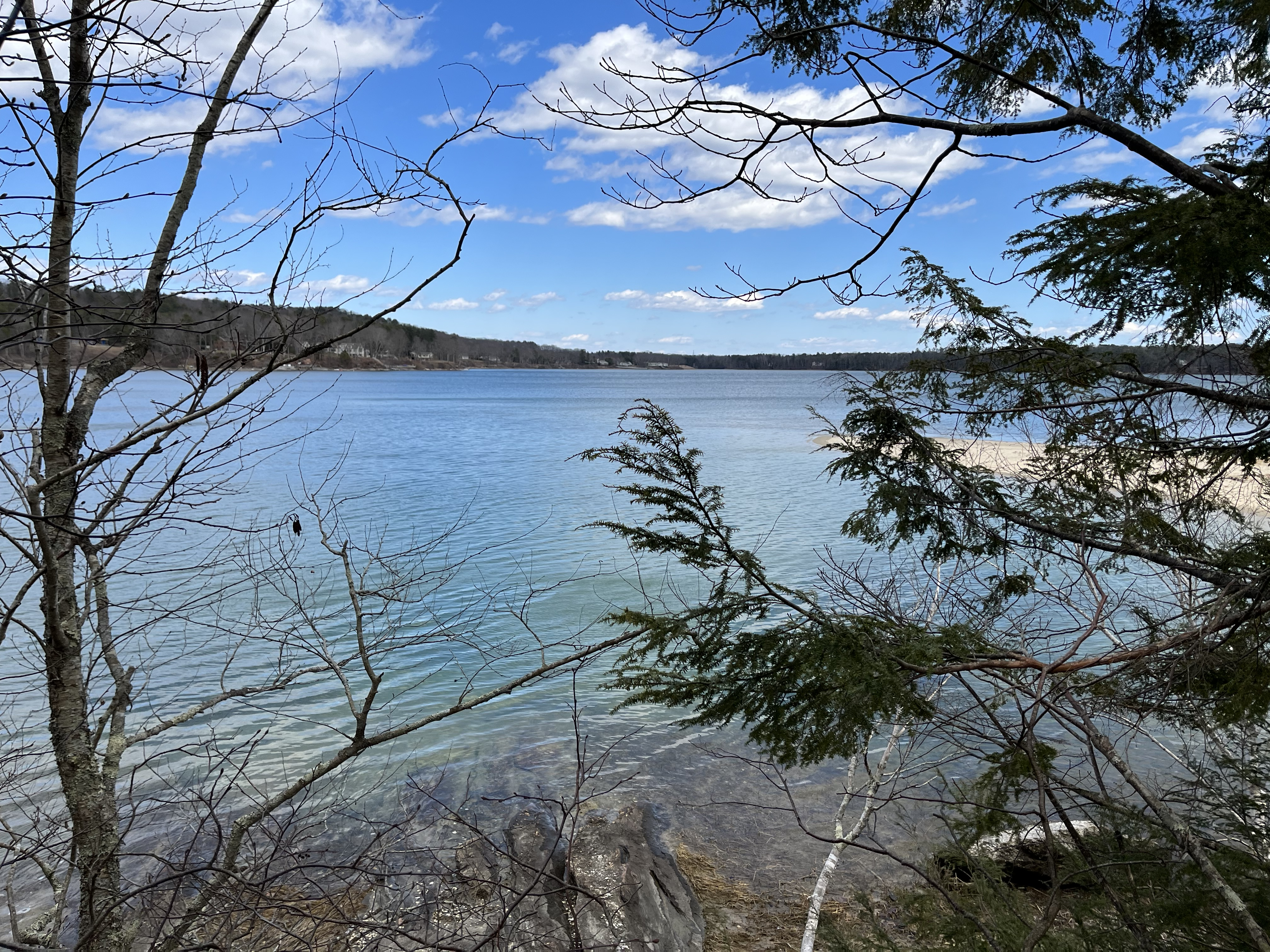
- Broad Cove Reserve, Cumberland
- Abbreviation: CCLT
- Founded: 1987 (39 years ago)
- Type: Nonprofit
- Headquarters: Cumberland, Maine
- Location: U.S.
- Services: Conservation
- Executive Director: Penny Asherman
- Website: https://www.ccltmaine.org/

The Chebeague & Cumberland Land Trust (CCLT) is a volunteer-run conservation group based in Cumberland, Maine, United States. Established in 1987 and funded by its members, it owns many preserves and trail networks, and has assisted in the creation of town-owned parks and preserves. The trust, one of eighty land trusts in Maine, covers the towns of Cumberland and Chebeague Island.

The trust's executive director is Penny Asherman, while its president is Rod Vogel.

== History ==
The trust, originally named Cumberland Mainland & Islands Trust, was formed in 1987 while a national movement was underway "to protect land for its natural resource value and enjoyment of the public." Chebeague Island was then part of Cumberland, but it seceded in 2007; as such, the trust changed to its current name.

Since 1987, the trust has completed 31 conservation projects and 23 conservation easements, protecting over 1,000 acres (400 ha).

== Properties ==
- Basket Island, Casco Bay
- Belvin, Chebeague Island
- Berkovich, Cumberland
- Broad Cove Reserve / Spears Hill Trail, Cumberland
- Bruce Hill, Cumberland
- Carley–Grant, Cumberland
- Chandler Reserve, Chebeague
- Curit, Chebeague
- Deer Point, Chebeague
- Farwell Forest, Cumberland
- Frog Pond and Salamander Swamp, Cumberland
- Gray Path, Chebeague
- Greely Woods, Cumberland
- Hamilton Durgin Woods and Durgin Trail, Chebeague
- Higgins Farm, Chebeague
- Indian Point, Chebeague
- Jessie Bullens–Crewe, Cumberland
- Knight's Pond Preserve, Cumberland
- Littlefield Woods, Chebeague
- Longwoods Preserve, Cumberland
- Meetinghouse Farm, Cumberland
- Ministerial Island, Casco Bay
- Read Family Farm and Woods, Cumberland
- Rines Forest, Cumberland
- Rock Bridge, Cumberland
- Rose's Point, Chebeague
- Sanford's Pond, Chebeague
- Spring Brook Farm, Cumberland
- Stockman Island, Casco Bay
- Waterfall Trail, Cumberland

== See also ==
- List of environmental and conservation organizations in the United States
