= Cape Ann Vernal Pond Team =

Nonprofit organization based in the US

- Abbreviation: CAVPT
- Formation: 1990
- Director: Rick Roth
- Website: capeannvernalpondteam.org

The Cape Ann Vernal Pond Team (CAVPT) is a nonprofit organization operating around Cape Ann, Massachusetts, and devoted to identifying and preserving vernal ponds, as well as educating the public about reptiles and amphibians.

The organization was founded in 1990 by Rick Roth and became a registered 501(c)(3) non-profit in 2006.

Its educational work involves putting on events in which attendees can view and interact with different species of snakes. These shows are put on in various schools, libraries, and other public places.

The team also leads nighttime trips to vernal ponds, educating the public about their ecology and conservation.

CAVPT has identified and certified over 300 vernal pools on Cape Ann, a process intended to give the ponds protection from development through the Massachusetts Natural Heritage and Endangered Species Program, as the ponds receive little governmental protection unless certified.
