= Employees Provident Fund =

Employees Provident Fund or Employees' Provident Fund refer to:

- Employees' Provident Fund Organisation, in India
- Employees Provident Fund (Malaysia)
- Employees Provident Fund Nepal
- Employees' Provident Fund (Sri Lanka)
