= Celebrate Planet Earth =

U.S. non-profit organization

Celebrate Planet Earth, formerly known as Earth's Birthday Project, is a U.S.-based 501(c)(3) environmental educational non-profit organization.

== History ==
Since Earth's Birthday Project's founding in 1989, it is estimated that more than 15 million school children have participated in butterfly and sunflower activities, as well as rainforest and river conservation.

In the late 1980s, as the twentieth anniversary of Earth Day approached, Cliff Ross was teaching middle school in New York City. Ross, his wife Lisa Werenko and his brother Tom Ross had just published their first environmental children's book, It Zwibble, the Star-touched Dinosaur, through Scholastic. It seemed to them that Earth Day might be more effective if it could be a celebration; if it could become a day not only for activists but also for children. They thought, "Why not give the Earth a birthday party?"

They then invited children from across New York City to celebrate the first Earth's Birthday on the Great Lawn of Central Park. With the help of teachers, donors and the Parks Commission, the children celebrated the 20th anniversary of Earth Day on April 20, 1990, and were joined by NYC Mayor Dinkins.

The first year's events "launched" the Earth's Birthday Project as a nonprofit organization. Several components of the first celebration have become hallmarks of Earth's Birthday Project's educational activities through the years:

- Butterflies – With a donation from Carolina Biological Supply, cups of painted lady butterfly caterpillars were given to 4,000 Head Start classrooms. After observing the metamorphosis of caterpillars into butterflies, the preschoolers released the butterflies on Earth Day.
- Sunflower seeds – children planted seeds in their classrooms and took the seedlings home to enjoy in pots or gardens until they bloomed.
- Rainforest conservation – Inspired by the Children's Rainforest in Costa Rica, initiated by students at Fagervick School in Sweden, Ross's eighth-grade class at Packer Collegiate Institute enrolled children across NYC to collect pennies and purchase threatened rainforest land in Latin America. The children donated the funds to The Nature Conservancy, an international conservation organization.

Earth's Birthday Project still puts butterflies into the hands of children, through programs in schools and individually to families. The organization also promotes the teaching of environmental issues as part of school science curriculum.

Earth's Birthday Project rebranded as Celebrate Planet Earth in 2019.

== Butterflies and sunflowers ==
Earth's Birthday Project provides teachers with live butterflies, ladybugs and sunflower seeds to capture children's imaginations and to engage them in close observation of living things. Through corporate sponsorship, like International Paper and the Toyota U.S.A. Foundation, Earth's Birthday Project provides hands-on materials to classrooms for free. In northern New Mexico, the NM Public Education Department has sponsored elementary science initiatives with Earth's Birthday Project.

== Rainforest conservation ==
Between 1989 and 2009, students participating in coin drives, bottle collections and other simple fundraising activities have raised $6.25 million to purchase and protect more than 400,000 acres of rainforest and other endangered habitat in partnership with conservation organizations like The Nature Conservancy, Conservation International and Nature & Culture International.

== Criticism ==
There is concern about the environmental impact of butterfly releases, in particular the release of monarch butterflies at weddings. Underlying the arguments against butterfly releases is the idea that companies should not raise butterflies for any commercial purposes, including science education, butterfly pavilions, weddings and celebrations; butterflies should only be experienced in nature. Arguments include the potential spread of disease into wild populations, influence on the gene pool, introduction of species outside of their native range and cruelty to captive insects. Whether these concerns are overstated or if they need serious study is unclear. Concerning Earth's Birthday Project specifically, the organization supplies painted lady butterfly caterpillars, which are native throughout North America, for educational purposes only. Observing the metamorphosis of a butterfly in approximately 21 days teaches children about insect life cycles which is included in the required curricula of many states. Butterfly releases by a classroom are small, 3–5 butterflies; if several classrooms participate, there may be 20–30 butterflies. In addition teachers and parents report that raising butterflies introduces children to caring for the natural world and leads easily to improving wildlife habitat at school and in the local community.

== Partners ==
Partners of the organization include World Land Trust, The Nature Conservancy, and African Wildlife Foundation.
