= Northeast Wilderness Trust =

- Northeast Wilderness Trust Corporation
- Formation: 2002; 24 years ago
- Type: Nonprofit
- Tax ID no.: 01-0729039
- Legal status: 501(c)(3)
- Purpose: Wild land conservation and protection
- Headquarters: Montpelier, Vermont
- Board President: Mark Anderson
- Executive Director: Jon Leibowitz
- Board of directors: Mark Anderson; Susie O'Keeffe; Rick Rancourt; Brian Tijan; Emily Bateson; Kristin DeBoer; Brett Engstrom; Carol Fox; Daniel Hildreth; Randy Kritkausky; Eric Sorenson; Henry Tepper; Liz Thompson; Paul Torrence
- Website: https://newildernesstrust.org/

The Northeast Wilderness Trust is a non-profit conservation organization based in Montpelier, Vermont, working to preserve and restore forest landscapes in Maine, New Hampshire, Vermont, New York, Massachusetts, and Connecticut. Its mission is to conserve forever-wild landscapes for nature and people. It was founded in 2002.

The Northeast Wilderness Trust works with landowners and partners to restore, rewild, and preserve forest landscapes through land acquisition, conservation easements, donations, and other conservation methods. Its land protection priorities are based on conservation science, wilderness potential, threat abatement, and opportunity.

Wilderness Trust projects include the Howland Research Forest (Maine), Alder Stream Wilderness Preserve (Maine), Eagle Mountain Wilderness Preserve (New York), Binney Hill Wilderness Preserve (New Hampshire), Woodbury Mountain Wilderness Preserve (Vermont), and others across the Northeast. As of March of 2022, the organization protects over 64,000 acres of wilderness.

In February 2020, the Wilderness Trust purchased 50 acres of land connected to the Binney Hill Wilderness Preserve which includes the Binney Pond shoreline.

== See also ==
- Conservation in the United States
