= Chesapeake Bay Trust =

U.S. non-profit organization

- Formation: 1985; 41 years ago
- Type: Nonprofit
- Tax ID no.: 52-1454182
- Legal status: 501(c)(3)
- Headquarters: Annapolis, Maryland
- Board Chair: Gary Jobson
- President: Jana Davis, Ph.D.
- Website: cbtrust.org

The Chesapeake Bay Trust is a non-profit organization established by the Maryland General Assembly in 1985. Its mission is to support restoration and environmental education efforts that improve the health of the Chesapeake Bay watershed and Maryland's other natural resources. The organization makes millions of dollars in grants per year. The organization receives no public tax dollars. It is funded primarily through sales of commemorative Chesapeake Bay license plates, voluntary donations to the Chesapeake and Endangered Species Fund, and partnerships with other funders and foundations. Headquartered in Annapolis, Maryland, the organization has repeatedly received four stars (the highest possible rating) from Charity Navigator, an independent charity evaluator.
