= Endangered Planet Foundation =

American non-profit organization

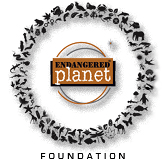
- Founded: 2007
- Founder: Charles Michael Murray
- Type: Private foundation (IRS status): 501(c)(3)
- Purpose: Environment, Conservation, Arts, Community
- Location: Laguna Beach, California, United States
- Method: Exhibitions, Seminars, Environmental Education, Sponsorships, Festivals, Artwork
- Website: www.endangeredplanetfoundation.org

The Endangered Planet Foundation (EPF) is a 501(c)(3) non-profit organization founded in the United States whose mission is to raise awareness of pro-environmental causes.

== Overview ==
EPF was founded by Charles Michael Murray, a graphic designer and commercial photographer, as the philanthropic arm of the Endangered Planet Gallery, an art space opened in Laguna Beach, California in 2005.

EPF board of directors and advisors have included Earth Day founder John McConnell, Joanne Tawfilis, a Bob Marley Peace Award winner and former United Nations executive, attorney Jonathan R. Ellowitz, and environmental author, Chris Prelitz.

== Activities ==
Endangered Planet in collaboration with The Art Miles Mural Project featured a talk by Angelina Usanova - "Miss Eco International 2024" in Laguna Beach on August 4, 2024, on environmental degradation and possible solutions.

Early fundraising efforts organized by EPF include the public screenings of the documentary films The 11th Hour and One: The Movie. EPF also co-produced a town hall meeting titled "Laguna Beach – Earth Trustee", featuring a discussion panel headed by John McConnell, and a City of Laguna Beach Proclamation stating Earth Day coincides with the vernal equinox.

Additional activities aimed at raising awareness of environmental and humanitarian issues included supporting Habitat for Humanity of Orange County, promoting/co-funding Sailors Without Borders in its mission to bring aid (such as solar panels and much-needed goods) to the victims of the 2010 Haiti earthquake, and a collaboration connecting arts with the environment known as the "Environmental Mile" which toured internationally as part of the Art Miles Mural Project (AMMP).

EPF sponsored and organized the One Earth | One Dream EcoFests in 2008 and 2009 with grants made available by entities such as the City of Laguna Beach. The events drew thousands of participants to view green exhibitors, award-winning films, eco-themed design and art exhibits. Also featured were symposiums where keynote speakers, including photographer and National Geographic’s Eco-Ambassador, Chris Jordan, former UN Ambassador Anwarul Chowdhury, Wayne Nastri, of the U.S. Environmental Protection Agency, and noted artist, Wyland, discussed environmental concerns, examining topics such as environmental impacts on women's and children's health, food and farming practices, eco-business, sustainable living and automotive fossil fuel reduction. EPF, One Earth | One Dream provided support and sponsorship of the Laguna Beach Earth Day & Kelp Fest in 2012.
