= Prairie Rivers Network =

US non-profit organization

- Abbreviation: PRN
- Formation: 1967; 59 years ago
- Founder: Bruce Hannon; Patricia Hannon
- Tax ID no.: 37-6085905
- Legal status: 501(c)(3)
- Headquarters: Champaign, Illinois
- Location: United States
- Board President: Jon Mcnussen
- Executive Director: Maggie Bruns
- Website: prairierivers.org
- Formerly called: Committee on Allerton Park

Prairie Rivers Network (PRN) is a non-profit organization (a registered 501(c)(3) organization in the United States), located in Champaign, Illinois. Their work goes on throughout Illinois as an independent, state affiliate of the National Wildlife Federation. The organization describes its mission: "Using the creative power of science, law, and collective action, we protect and restore our rivers, return healthy soils and diverse wildlife to our lands, and transform how we care for the earth and for each other. We protect water, heal land, and inspire change."

== History ==
The organization was founded in 1967 by Bruce and Patricia Hannon under the name Committee on Allerton Park. Initially organized to stop a dam project by the United States Army Corps of Engineers on the Sangamon River near Decatur, Illinois. The dam was opposed because the resulting reservoir would have flooded large parts of Allerton Park and adjacent lands. The effort to stop that project, that would have created the Oakley Reservoir, was ultimately successful and it was federally deauthorized in 1985. The organization changed its name in 1984 to Central States Education Center, and again in 1998 to Prairie Rivers Network.

PRN advocates for waterways and the health of riparian ecosystems throughout Illinois. The key areas of the PRN's work include pollution from industrial agriculture and factory farming, contamination from coal ash and coal mining, and working with communities and farmers on efforts to maintain and restore the health of soil and water.

=== Coal ash and the suit against Dynegy ===
In May 2018, PRN, represented by Earthjustice, sued the company Dynegy over violations of the Clean Water Act resulting from coal ash piles along the Middle Fork of the Vermilion River. The coal ash piles are connected to the Vermilion Power Station, which was closed by Dynegy in 2011. The Power Station was built by Illinois Power along the west bank of the Vermilion River in 1956, and acquired by Dynegy in 2000. After the station's closure in 2011, Dynegy merged with Vistra Energy Corporation, and the new company now operates under the name Vistra.
