= Alliance for the Chesapeake Bay =

U.S. nonprofit organization

The Alliance for the Chesapeake Bay (Alliance) is a regional nonprofit organization that builds and fosters partnerships and consensus to protect and restore the Chesapeake Bay and its rivers and streams. Their motto is "Together, we can get the job done!".

The Alliance hosts a diverse network of local watershed groups and hosts events such as an annual gathering of conservation professionals and local activists called the Chesapeake Watershed Forum. The Alliance implements local programs that connect people to their local river such as Project Clean Stream, an annual volunteer stream cleanup effort and River Trends which supports "citizen scientists" who monitor the quality of bodies of water in their area and become directly involved in local restoration efforts.

The Alliance was founded in 1971 and has offices in Annapolis, Maryland, Camp Hill, Pennsylvania, and Richmond, Virginia. The Alliance focuses its activities around three primary goals:

- Engaging Communities to find Solutions. Programs which bring together citizens, watershed groups, businesses, local governments, and others to build collaborative projects and innovative programs that educate and engage them in local restoration efforts and projects that facilitate a balanced analysis issues, foster participation in the establishment of sound policy, and build consensus where constructive dialogue is lacking.
- Connecting People to the Bay and its Rivers. Programs which promote local on-the-ground volunteer and education experiences with local stream and forests, monitoring water quality, or enhancing citizen participation that makes a difference in local communities. Since 1990 the Alliance has sponsored "River Sojourns." These are educational and awareness-raising events in which people take a paddling trip down different rivers in the Bay's watershed. The trips build an ethic of environmental stewardship via on-river and camping activities focusing on historical, ecological, and cultural topics.
- Healing the Land and Water. The Alliance coordinates a broad range of on-the-ground restoration programs. The Alliance’s signature BayScapes and River Wise programs give homeowners and businesses the information they need to develop landscapes that conserve water, prevent pollution and create wildlife habitat. The Alliance has been a leader in the development of functional landscapes such as rain gardens. The Alliance works with landowners and municipalities to sustain healthy forests and plant trees along streams and rivers—among the most cost effective ways to reduce the flow of pollution into the Bay. Restorative programs range from planting trees in an urban center to managing large scale stream restoration projects but are always designed to involve and support local governments and watershed groups.
