= African American Environmentalist Association =

The Center for Environment, Commerce and Energy (Center) is a private, public interest group focusing on environmental issues. Its stated aims include protecting the environment, enhancing human, animal and plant ecologies, promoting the efficient use of natural resources and increasing participation in the environmental movement.

The African American Environmentalist Association (AAEA) is the outreach arm of the Center.

The Center describes itself as "aggressively non-partisan". It has supported Republican policy positions, and particularly those of President George W. Bush on such issues as stem cell research and nuclear power, but has also expressed support for Democrats including Joseph Lieberman.

The Center is listed as a member of the Nuclear Fuels Reprocessing Coalition and Norris McDonald is its Co-Chairman. AAEA is listed as a member of the New York Affordable Reliable Electricity Alliance. AAEA maintains the Environmental Justice Blog

== Leadership ==
The group was founded by Norris McDonald who remains its president.
