= Mountain Justice (organization) =

Nature conservation organization based in the United States

Mountain Justice is a grassroots movement established in 2005 to raise worldwide awareness of mountaintop removal mining and its effects on the environment and peoples of Appalachia. The group seeks to encourage conservation, efficiency, solar and wind energy as alternatives to all forms of surface mining. It self-describes as "a regional Appalachian network committed to ending mountaintop removal". It seeks justice because the mountaintop removal (MTR) it opposes is a form of coal mining known as mountaintop removal mining which produces coal sludge toxic waste which is stored in a dam on the mountain and leaches into the groundwater, which poisons the environment, which defaces the top of the mountain, and which is not stopped due to political corruption.

The group is non-hierarchical, and decisions are made using a consensus model of decision making. In 2008, the group shortened their name from Mountain Justice Summer to simply Mountain Justice to reflect the year round efforts of their activities.

== Group details ==
Location: Kentucky, Tennessee, Virginia, and West Virginia

Mission Statement: Mountain Justice seeks to add to the growing anti-MTR citizens movement. Specifically Mountain Justice demands an abolition of MTR, steep slope strip mining and all other forms of surface mining for coal. We work to protect the cultural and natural heritage of the Appalachia coal fields. We work to contribute with grassroots organizing, public education, nonviolent civil disobedience and other forms of citizen action.

Historically coal companies have engaged in violence and property destruction when faced with citizen opposition to their activities. Mountain Justice is committed to nonviolence and will not be engaged in property destruction.

We work together to create diverse and sustainable economies in Appalachian regions traditionally dominated by the coal industry by supporting businesses, jobs and ways of living that are not environmentally or culturally destructive and are nourishing to the social and biological fabric of healthy communities.

== Actions ==
=== June 7, 2005: First stockholders meeting of National Coal Corporation Disrupted ===
On June 7, 2005, approximately 45 Mountain Justice activists, some in animal costumes, surprised the first-ever shareholders meeting of Knoxville-based National Coal Corporation with a marching band, chants, drumming and noise makers. Demonstrators demanded that National Coal stop mountaintop removal mining and distributed informational flyers to shareholders. The sheriff and National Coal Corporation responded by assaulting protesters with pain compliance, choke holds and arrested three on bogus felony charges.

=== June 30, 2005: West Virginia citizens occupy Massey headquarters ===
On June 30, 2005, Concerned parents, grandparents and other citizens of Coal River Valley, West Virginia, with support from Mountain Justice participants, delivered a list of demands to Massey Energy's headquarters in Richmond, Virginia, insisting that Massey respond. Two were arrested for trespassing when they refused to leave the premises until Massey responded to their demands. The citizens demanded that Massey shut down its preparation plant, coal silo, 1,849-acre mountaintop removal coal mine and 2.8 billion-gallon coal sludge dam - a toxic waste storage facility — located feet from an elementary school, Marsh Fork Elementary, in Sundail, West Virginia.

=== Aug. 15, 2005: Earth First!/Mountain Justice blockade of Campbell County mountaintop removal site ===
On August 15, 2005, Earth First! and Mountain Justice activists blockaded a road leading to National Coal's mountaintop removal coal mine in Campbell County, Tennessee. Activists stopped a car on the road, removed its tires, locked themselves to the vehicle, and erected a tripod with a person perched on top of it. National Coal workers arrived and threatened the protestors; one tried to ram the tripod with his car. Eleven people were arrested; the police treated the arrested activists very roughly, endangering their safety.

=== June 26, 2007: March & Street Theater at Dominion Headquarters ===
On June 26, 2007, 35 people with the Southern Appalachian Mountain Stewards and Mountain Justice marched in Richmond, VA, calling for Dominion Resources to abandon its plans for a Wise County Plant in southwest Virginia. The march began at Massey Energy's headquarters, where participants acted out a "baby shower" for newly mined coal. With "baby coal" placed in a coffin, the march moved to Dominion Resources' headquarters and a mock funeral was held for the coal, drawing a line between strip mining and coal-fired power plants.

=== Mar. 16, 2007: Sit-in at West Virginia Gov. Manchin's office ===
On March 16, 2007, dozens of West Virginia community members - together with activists from Mountain Justice and Rising Tide North America - occupied the office of West Virginia Governor Joe Manchin, in protest of the State Mine Board's approval of construction permits for a second coal silo near Marsh Fork Elementary School in Sundial, West Virginia. Community activists demanded that the state move the school; state officials have failed to comply thus far. Eleven people were arrested at this action, and many were treated roughly by police.

=== Nov. 15, 2007: Rainforest Action Network day of action against coal finance ===
On November 15, 2007, Rainforest Action Network activists - acting together with allies from Coal River Mountain Watch, Appalachian Voices, Rising Tide North America, Mountain Justice, Student Environmental Action Coalition, and Energy Justice Network - staged dozens of actions against Citibank and Bank of America branches in cities across the county, in protest of those two companies' refusal to stop funding new coal power plant development and coal mountaintop removal mining. In San Francisco, RAN activists attached caution tape - reading "Global Warming Crime Scene" - to dozens of Bank of America and Citibank ATMs, and held "cough-ins" in several branches. Similar ATM closure actions were held in New York City, Davis (CA), Los Angeles, Portland (OR), and St. Petersburg (FL), while protests against the two companies were held in numerous other cities.

=== March 6, 2008: Bluegrass at the Bank, Boone, NC ===
On March 6, 2008, approximately two dozen Mountain Justice activists visited a Bank of America in Boone North Carolina to protest the bank's funding of mountaintop removal coal mining and coal-fired power plants.

=== March 28, 2008: Mountain Justice Spring Break action at AMP-Ohio headquarters in Columbus ===
On March 28, 2008, activists participating in Mountain Justice Spring Break occupied the lobby of AMP-Ohio's headquarters in Columbus, Ohio, and demanded a meeting with AMP's CEO Marc Gerken. Several people stated their intention to conduct a sit-in in the office if their demands weren't met; about 40 people protested outside. After 30 minutes, Gerken met with the protestors, and agreed to their demands: to schedule a meeting of the board of trustees at which community members could present their concerns with AMP-Ohio's proposed coal-fired power plant in Meigs County, Ohio. No arrests were made.

=== June 30, 2008: Activists Blockade Dominion Headquarters ===
On June 30, 2008, 20 Activists with Blue Ridge Earth First! and Mountain Justice blockaded the entrance to Dominion Resources' corporate headquarters to protest the company's plan for the new coal-fired Wise County Plant in Southwest Virginia. Four protesters formed a human chain with their hands encased in containers of hardened cement and a fifth dangled by a climber's harness from the Lee Bridge footbridge. After several hours police made their way through the miles of backed up traffic to cut the activists out of the lockboxes and barrels. The climber came down on his own. Police also detained eight others standing on the sidewalks supporting the lockdown team. 13 in total were arrested.

=== July 10, 2008: Mountain Justice activists protest approval of coal gasification plant, Boston, MA ===
On July 10, 2008, nearly fifty Mountain Justice activists gathered in opposition to a coal project in Massachusetts, donning hazmat suits and delivering a pile of coal while displaying "global warming crime scene" caution tape on the front steps of the Office of Energy and Environmental Affairs in Boston. The action was in response to the office dismissing an appeal of the state's approval for a coal gasification project in Somerset, MA.

=== July 20, 2008: Four arrested at Tennessee strip mine ===
On July 20, 2008, residents from coal-impacted communities throughout Appalachia gathered for a march at Zeb Mountain, the largest surface coal mining site in Tennessee, to protest the environmentally destructive practice of mountaintop removal and surface coal mining. The march was organized by United Mountain Defense, Mountain Justice, and Three Rivers Earth First! and included political theater, life-sized puppets and rousing speeches. In an act of civil disobedience, four citizen activists walked across a line marked with police tape designating National Coal Corporation's property. The four were immediately arrested without incidence and removed from the property by the Campbell County Sheriff's office.

=== September 15, 2008: 20 Protesters lock-down at Dominion coal plant construction site, Wise County, West Virginia ===
On September 15, 2008, around 50 peaceful protesters entered the construction site of Dominion Resources Virginia's coal-fired Wise County Plant. Twenty protesters locked their bodies to eight large steel drums, two of which have operational solar panels affixed to the top that illuminated a banner reading "renewable jobs to renew Appalachia." In addition to those locked to the construction site, over 25 protesters convened in front of the plant singing and holding a 10'x30' banner, which said "we demand a clean energy future." Eleven were arrested. This action was organized by Mountain Justice, Blue Ridge Earth First!, Rainforest Action Network, Asheville Rising Tide, and Students for Democratic Society.

=== March 14, 2009: 14 Arrested at TVA headquarters in Knoxville, Tennessee ===
Local residents joined dozens of activists from across the country in a demonstration at the Tennessee Valley Authority's headquarters, which resulted in the arrest of 14 individuals, after participating in a "die in" in front of the building. This event was held in solidarity with communities affected by the destructive impacts of mountaintop removal coal mining and the survivors of the coal ash disaster in Harriman. The demonstration began with a rally in Market Square, where organizers from United Mountain Defense and Mountain Justice spoke about coal's impact from cradle to grave on communities in Appalachia and the surrounding area. At the end of the march people interested in participating in civil disobedience gave a statement as to why they wanted to take this action. With the support of a singing crowd each participant fell to the ground representing the deaths caused by the coal industry. After a few minutes Knoxville law enforcement informed the participants that they were blocking the sidewalk, and that they needed to remove themselves from the area. All 14 people were arrested, and cited for loitering.

=== March 20, 2009: 'Bluegrass at the Bank' hits Florida Bank of America branch ===
Members of Mountain Justice and Earth First! from Florida and Appalachia disrupted the lobby of a Bank of America branch in Sarasota, FL in protest of the Bank's continued funding of mountaintop removal mining and the construction of new coal-fired power plants despite recent claims of environmental concern.

=== May 23, 2009: 17 arrested at 3 separate action in Coal River Valley, West Virginia ===
In the morning, two people donning hazmat suits and respirators were arrested after taking boating into the Brushy Fork Impoundment in the Coal River Valley. Later, over seventy-five residents of Coal River Valley along with members of Mountain Justice and Climate Ground Zero picketed the entrance to Massey Energy's Marfork Complex mining site. The group was protesting Massey's plans to blast 100 feet near the Brushy Fork sludge impoundment. Seven people were arrested after approaching the dam facility's entrance and refusing to leave. In the third action, six people chained themselves to a dump truck on a MTR mine owned by Patriot Coal on Kayford Mountain. All six were arrested.

=== June 23, 2009: 31 Arrested at Marsh Fork Elementary School ===
Mountain Justice and residents of Coal River Valley again joined forces for a rally at Marsh Fork Elementary School, where the group delivered a list of demands to Massey Energy. The approximately 400 protesters were met by Massey employees, who shouted obscenities and taunts at the protesters. Arrests were made after a smaller group of the activists sat down in the middle of the road. Among those arrested were 94-year-old former U.S. Congressperson Ken Hechler, NASA scientist James E. Hansen, actress Daryl Hannah, and West Virginia residents.

=== July 26, 2009: MJS parades against the TVA in Knoxville, Tennessee ===
An activist parade made its way through downtown Knoxville. Almost 100 people associated with Mountain Justice, United Mountain Defense, and Three Rivers Earth First!. Around the Tennessee Valley Authority Headquarters and the John J. Duncan Federal Building, home of the Office of Surface Mining environmental regulator. The group protested the TVA's involvement in coal extraction and combustion, especially in light of the December 2008 coal combustion waste spill at a TVA plant.

=== August 14–19, 2009: Nationwide rallies at regional EPA headquarters ===
Rallies were held against the Environmental Protection Agency's role in mountaintop removal at the regional EPA offices in Atlanta, New York, Boston, Dallas, Kansas City, Philadelphia, San Francisco, and Washington, D.C. Some of the groups involved were Mountain Justice, Mountain Defense, Student Environmental Action Coalition, and Energy Justice Network. The protests were organized because mountaintop removal permits were approved under EPA chief Lisa Jackson and the Obama administration despite Obama's campaign rhetoric opposing the mining practice.

=== October 19, 2009: 7 Arrested at West VirginiaGovernor's Office ===
Residents of Coal River Valley and their allies delivered a letter to West Virginia Governor Joe Manchin, urging him to declare a state of emergency and rescind permits for the Bee Tree mountaintop removal mine on Coal River. The letter was signed by 13 residents and accompanied by nine personal statements, a cross-section image of the neighboring Brushy Fork sludge impoundment and underground mines below, and an aerial image of the impoundment. Seven people sat in Manchin's antechamber and refused to leave at the office's closing time; the seven were arrested with misdemeanors for trespassing and obstruction.

=== October 22, 2009: Lockdown on WV MTR mine ===
Four Climate Ground Zero and Mountain Justice activists chained themselves to each other and blocked a road on a mountaintop removal mine in Kanawha County, WV. The protesters were joined by four people who provided them with support; all eight were arrested. Bail was set at $2,000 each (totaling $16,000) with no 10% bond option, and was ordered to be paid in cash only.

=== October 27, 2009: KY MJ protests University of KY alliance with Coal ===
Kentucky Mountain Justice organizers hung a banner at the University of Kentucky in Lexington in protest of a decision to name a campus building the "Wildcat Coal Lodge." Despite opposition from some faculty, basketball players and fans, environmentalists, and general student population, the Board of Trustees approved the dorm name in a 16–3 vote at their annual meeting in October 2009. Among the concerns about "coal" in the name was the issue that it arguably conflicts with UK's pledge to transition to renewable energy and that the building is LEED-certified. A letter from an opposing Board of Trustees member to UK faculty can be found here.

=== January 20–29, 2010: Tree Sits Stops Blasting on Coal River Mountain ===
Three protesters associated with Climate Ground Zero and Mountain Justice halted blasting on a portion of Massey Energy's Bee Tree mountaintop removal mine on Coal River Mountain, West Virginia by ascending three trees, two tulip poplars and an oak tree. David Aaron Smith, 23 Amber Nitchman, 19 and Eric Blevins, 28 were on platforms approximately 60 feet up in direct protest of mountaintop removal mining and blasting near the Brushy Fork Coal Impoundment. Joshua Graupera, Isabelle Rozendaal, and Bernard Fiorillo were also arrested for providing ground support. The tree sit halted blasting for nine days. A federal judge granted a permanent injunction to Marfork Coal Co. Inc., a subsidiary of Massey Energy, ordering the defendants to keep off all company property. The occupation was strategically placed next to the spot where Massey was blasting for a road for the Bee Tree mine. Massey employees responded with constant harassment including air horns, bright lights throughout the night, and violent threats. Governor Joe Manchin called for an end to the violence but did not take any steps to intervene. One tree-sitter came down on the fourth day. On the fifth day, police arrested someone who was attempting to deliver aid bags to the tree-sitters. The remaining two tree-sitters decided to descend because of cold temperatures.

=== May 18, 2010: Protest at Massey Shareholders Meeting ===
Environmental groups (including Mountain Justice, Coal River Mountain Watch, the Ohio Valley Environmental Coalition, and Rising Tide) teamed up with labor unions to protest Massey Energy at the company's annual shareholder meeting in Richmond, Virginia. The event was six weeks after an explosion at Massey's Upper Big Branch mine killed 29 miners, the worst coal mining disaster in the U.S. in forty years. Protesters called for Don Blankenship to resign and be prosecuted by the law for the accident and many other safety and environmental violations Massey has committed under Blankenship. Some protesters wore orange jumpsuits. At least two were arrested after hanging a banner inside the Jefferson Hotel, where the meeting took place, and were cited for trespassing.

=== June 8, 2010: PNC Bank protested for MTR financing ===
In Lexington, Kentucky, Mountain Justice participants and coalfield residents joined local residents to protest a PNC Bank branch because of the bank's role in financing mountaintop removal mining. The protest included a floating banner and a clown street-theater troupe. PNC bank has been the number one financier of MTR mining since January 2008. As PNC was the recipient of government bailout money, protesters highlighted the connection between taxpayer money and money invested in MTR.

=== July 14, 2010: Lockdown on Coal River Mountain ===
Two protesters with Mountain Justice and Climate Ground Zero locked themselves to mining equipment on the Massey Energy's Bee Tree mine, close to the Brushy Fork sludge impoundment. They were joined by two people filling supportive roles. All four were arrested and held on $12,000 bail altogether.

== See also ==
- Capitol Power Plant
- Global warming
- Environmental justice and coal mining in Appalachia
