= Fossil Fools Day =

Day focused on environmental issues

- Date: 1 April
- Next time: 1 April 2027
- Frequency: annual

Fossil Fools Day is an international environmental demonstration day on April 1 annually. The name is a play on the terms "Fossil Fuels" and "April Fools' Day."

Fossil Fools Days have been held in many cities around the world. Larger demonstrations have been organized by environmental organizations such as Energy Action Coalition and Rising Tide. These events oppose energy derived from fossil fuels, promote education about alternative sources of energy, and encourage support for climate justice, strong legislation, corporate responsibility and a clean renewable energy future. Protests may also encourage citizens to do their part with lifestyle changes such as riding bikes, reducing electricity usage, and investing in solar or wind energy for their homes.

== Origin ==
Fossil Fools Day began in 2004 with coordinated actions across American and Canadian high schools and universities where they played over 125 coordinated April Fools' Day pranks centered around the dangers from using and harvesting fossil fuels. Pranks included "a mock oil spill at a public fountain, and meandering an inflatable black pipe" to oppose a proposed oil pipeline between the United States and Canada. Other demonstrations were focused on education, such as the use of stationary bikes attached to generators to show the difference in power use between incandescent and fluorescent bulbs on the campus of the University of North Carolina.

== Fossil Fools Day activities ==
Subsequent Fossil Fools Day activities garnered additional international attention. In 2008, with 35 actions targeting the fossil fuel industry across Britain, 100 in North America, and some in South Africa and Australia, April 1 became an established day for climate activism. The international Rising Tide network joined by Earth First!, Rainforest Action Network, the Energy Action Coalition, the Canadian Youth Climate Coalition, the Australian Student Environment Network and others called for action on Fossil Fools' Day through street blockades and satirical signage. Activists temporarily blocked construction at a North Carolina coal plant, created disruptive blockades of fossil fuel infrastructure in Britain, and displayed a banner in Newcastle Australia that asked, "How does buying stuff fuel climate change?"

== See also ==
- Conservation movement
- Earth Day
- Energy Action Coalition
- Environmentalism
- Environmental protection
- Natural resource
- Renewable resource
