= Rock Creek, West Virginia =

Rock Creek, West Virginia may refer to:

- Rock Creek, Boone County, West Virginia, an unincorporated community
- Rock Creek, Raleigh County, West Virginia, an unincorporated community
