= Student Environmental Action Coalition =

The Student Environmental Action Coalition (SEAC) was a student-run, student-led US national environmental group that originated in Chapel Hill, North Carolina. In the beginning it focused primarily on conserving, protecting, and restoring the natural environment, but later its member student environmental organizations took on a broader definition of the environment that includes racism, sexism, militarism, heterosexism, economic justice, and animal rights.

By challenging the power structure that threatens these conditions, SEAC worked to create progressive social and environmental change on both the local and global level. It took a hard-line stance on the issues it addressed. It went through several different stages of organization, and ended up as a bottom-up organization so that the headquarters took its direction from the individual chapters around the country. The national organization was wound up in 2014, but dozens of campus environmental groups still bear its name.

== History and past accomplishments ==
In 1988, students placed an ad in Greenpeace magazine about networking with other young environmentalists. Later, their first action was a letter writing campaign to support a Global Warming Protection Act. In early 1989, they set about organizing a national student environmental conference with the aim of launching a new, united, national student environmental movement in the United States. Called Threshold, this historic conference on the weekend of October 27–29, 1989, was a success, attracting more than 1,700 students from 225 universities and schools from 43 states and several countries. The conference effectively brought the organization to life, and its participants voted to make SEAC's first national campaign saving old-growth forest and reforming the U.S. Forest Service. The next time SEAC members met in Champaign, Illinois, a year later, they were 7,000 strong from every U.S. state, plus others from 11 countries.

At a summer 1991 meeting of the SEAC National Council, the group agreed on 2 major new projects: another national conference (called Common Ground, held in Boulder Colorado), and an international effort to influence outcome of the Earth Summit being held in Rio de Janeiro, Brazil in 1992. The Council also approved a field-organizing program.

The work on the Rio Summit was conducted under the banner Action for Solidarity, Equality, Environment and Development (A SEED), and involved youth organizations from around the world. A SEED grew into SEAC’s largest project, including a speaker’s tour, educational events, and coordinated conferences in three states and 23 countries over a single weekend and connected together by email and fax. In March 1992, SEAC organized demonstrations at the United Nations and by June, a SEAC member had been added as an official observer on the US delegation to the Summit. SEAC became the North American arm of the ASEED network, which operated in 62 countries.

At its peak SEAC employed 13 full-time staff in 1991, split between the national office, work on A SEED, and field organizing. In 1992, SEAC’s staff was cut to five amidst a loss of funding. 1992 also witnessed changes in the governance of the group as the National Council meeting agreed to the demand from a SEAC People of Color Caucus (POCC) to give the POCC equal representation on the Council. In 1993, SEAC campaigned on fighting the North America Free Trade Agreement and held its first summer Training Program. It also joined the Free Burma Campaign. In 1994, SEAC started a project, proposed by the POCC, called the Environmental Justice Initiative (EJI). The EJI sought to educate and empowering youth and high school students, and part of this initiative evolved into Youth United for Community Action, which became its own organization in 1996.

In the summer of 1996, SEAC's Coordinating Committee decided to cut a program that held activist training sessions at different schools in order to save money, but this precipitated a loss of philanthropic funding. Amid an internal struggle of staff, leadership and members, ultimately all the national staff quit and the national office closed. Meanwhile regional and local organizing continued, though the emergence of large and well-funded student networks as offshoots of mainstream national environmental organizations such as Sierra Student Coalition and student PIRGs, undermined SEAC's position at the center of student environmental activism. In 1997 volunteers reopened a much scaled down national office in Philadelphia, Pennsylvania.

Some of the accomplishments of SEAC chapters include:

January 1991- As SEACers protested the war in Iraq and at the same time launched the Energy Independence Campaign.

1992 - The New York chapter brought together 120 schools to protest the Hydro-Québec II dam in Canada. This dam would have flooded an area 1000 kilometers and damaged land of the indigenous Cree tribe. SEAC and the Cree challenged the two billion dollar Rupert River hydroelectric project again in 2005. Originally, the Cree had agreed on payment for this over 50 years summing $70 million at the hand of Grand Chieft Ted Moses. However, Matthew Mukash is the person now challenging it. In August 2005, “federal and provincial environmental review panels said Hydro-Québec's impact study was deeply flawed and sent the provincial utility back to the drawing board.”

1994 - Pitt & Michigan State removed themselves from the Mt. Graham Telescope project in Arizona which was endangering red squirrel habitat and sacred Apache land. Judge Alfredo Marquez oversaw the case in court stated the "risks of irreparable injury to the endangered red squirrels which live on the site" violated the Endangered Species Act and the National Environmental Policy Act.

At a University of Wisconsin, Madison Greens, Madison’s own annual Earth Day was created. Frances Moore Lappe (social change activist and one of Earth Days founders), Dana Lyons (environmentalist), and Road Rage (anti-GMO road show) visited the celebration. Part of the event was also a protest against the Agracetus Campus, a subsidiary Monsanto known for its genetically engineered Roundup as well as transgenic corn, cotton and soy. Roundup, a pesticide applied to crops, has glyphosates, which had varying results regarding carcinogenicity.

Miami Dade, Florida - A Student Organization for Animal Rights from the Miami-Dade Community College successfully pushed a bill through its General Assembly regarding the situation of factory-farmed pigs. This was a first nationwide.

Late 2002 – Berea, Kentucky – a joint effort observed a leap forward when the Pentagon released information stating “neutralization and supercritical water oxidation -- not incineration -- is its preferred recommended technology for destruction of chemical weapons stored at the Blue Grass Army Depot.”

November 2002 - After a two-year campaign, SEAC successfully convinced office supply company Staples to stop offering products that came from endangered forests and start offering recycled paper products.

Shepherdstown, West Virginia - A student won an election on the town council which was “a huge role in fighting gentrification as well as signing the town onto the US Mayors' Climate Protection Agreement”

“No Coal Days of Action” exposed Citibank and Bank of America’s support of destructive coal companies when SEACers performed a “die-in” and effectively shut down the Citibank branch in Washington, D.C.

March 2007 - Students protested mountaintop coal removal at “Mountain Justice Spring Break”, West Virginia.

October 2007 – “No War No Warming,” a war and global warming protest congregated at Capitol Hill on Independence Avenue.

== SEAC’s principles ==
SEAC has published 14 organizational principles:

1. Fight environmental degradation
2. Recognize the impact of the environment on human individuals and communities.
3. Support human rights.
4. Support animal rights.
5. Demand corporate responsibility.
6. Fight class inequalities.
7. Fight racism.
8. Fight sexism.
9. Fight homophobia and heterosexism.
10. Fight imperialism and militarism.
11. Have a diverse membership.
12. Develop an activist rather than a volunteer approach.
13. Link our issues to local, community concerns.
14. SEAC National exists to empower the grassroots through training and education. We view national campaigns as one of the tools to accomplish these goals.

== Last projects ==
At the end of its life, SEAC had one national campaign, Campus Climate Challenge, and three initiatives: Tampaction, Militarism and the Environment, and Mountain Justice.

The Campus Climate Challenge
SEAC was one of 30 organizations from the United States and Canada that was a part of Campus Climate Challenge, their primary campaign. Climatechallenge.org is a partner in fighting global warming.1, 10

Tampaction
Those participating in Tampaction believe that tampons and menstrual pads oppress people who menstruate. The products themselves are thought to be detrimental to the environment. The companies that make the products are suspected of dumping toxins into the ecosystem. Participants of Tampaction want to embrace their body and all that that implies and return to a more natural mindset, like herbal for example.

Militarism and the Environment
SEAC also fought military conflicts since in military conflicts bombs are dropped and/or dangerous chemicals are used, such as in napalm and chemical weapons. SEAC believed no war can be considered good. “No War No Warming” was an active project due to this concern. SEAC aimed for complete nuclear disarmament and a complete dismantling of nuclear arsenals.

Mountain Justice Spring Break
Mountain Justice Spring Break was an ongoing project supported by SEAC. Mountaintop mining economically benefits very few (including employment), and has disproportionally far-reaching environmental impacts, including soil erosion and flooding. When the mountaintop removal blasts ignite, dust particulates of materials in the soil become airborne and are having a negative impact on human health. In addition, when the blast site is too close to residential areas, the structural stability of the residential buildings is adversely affected.

== Schools with SEAC chapters ==
By state and alphabetized:

- Hendrix College (AR)
- San Francisco Bay (CA)
- University of Colorado, Boulder (CO)
- American University (DC)
- Bradley University (IL)
- Illinois State University (IL)
- Southern Illinois University (IL)
- Ball State University (IL)
- Indiana University (IN)
- St. Mary's College of Maryland (MD)
- University of Massachusetts Boston (MA)
- University of Massachusetts Dartmouth (MA)
- Central Michigan University (MI)
- Eastern Michigan University (MI)
- Grand Valley State University (MI)
- Michigan State University (MI)
- University of Michigan (MI)
- Wayne State University (MI)
- Hastings College (NE)
- University of New Hampshire, Durham (NH)
- Drew University (NJ)
- Spaulding High School (NH)
- Binghamton University (NY)
- Hofstra University (NY)
- The New School (NY)
- State University of New York College of Environmental Science and Forestry, Fredonia (NY)
- Stuyvesant High School (NY)
- Syracuse University (NY)
- Federal University of Technology Owerri (Nigeria)
- Central Carolina Community College (NC)
- University of North Carolina, Chapel Hill (NC)
- Wake Forest University (NC)
- Warren Wilson College (NC)
- Hiram College (OH)
- Ohio State University, Columbus (OH)
- University of Cincinnati, Cincinnati (OH)
- University of Toledo (OH)
- Carnegie Mellon University (PA)
- Mercyhurst University (PA)
- Shippensburg University (PA)
- Temple University (PA)
- University of Pittsburgh (PA)
- Providence College (RI)
- University of Regina (SK)
- Claflin University (SC)
- Clemson University (SC)
- College of Charleston (SC)
- Furman University (SC)
- University of South Carolina, Columbia (SC)
- Winthrop University (SC)
- Wofford College (SC)
- Middle Tennessee State University, Murfreesboro (TN)
- Tennessee Technological University, Cookeville (TN)
- Tusculum College (TN)
- The College of William and Mary (VA)
- James Madison University (VA)
- Thomas Jefferson High School for Science and Technology (VA)
- University of Virginia's College at Wise (VA)
- Virginia Tech (VA)
- Anstead Middle School (WV)
- Gilbert High School (WV)
- Glenville State College (WV)
- Fairmont State University (WV)
- Marshall University (WV)
- Midland Trail High School (WV)
- Shepherd University (WV)
- South Charleston High School (WV)
- University of Vermont (VT)
- West Virginia State University (WV)
- West Virginia Wesleyan College (WV)
- University of Wisconsin–Oshkosh (WI)

== See also ==
- Education in the United States
- Environment of the United States
- Environmental groups and resources serving K–12 schools
