= Twilly =

Twilly may refer to:

- Twilly Cannon (1955–2016), American environmental and social justice activist
- Willy (textile machine), also called a twilly
- Twilly Spree, a character in the 2000 novel Sick Puppy by Carl Hiaasen
