= Climate Ground Zero =

Civil disobedience campaign in West Virginia, US

Climate Ground Zero (CGZ), founded in February 2009, is a nonviolent civil disobedience campaign against mountaintop removal mining based in the southern coalfields of West Virginia. According to their website, Climate Ground Zero believes "that the irrevocable destruction of the mountains of Appalachia and its accompanying toll on the air, water, and lives of Appalachians necessitates continued and direct action". The organization seeks to end mountaintop removal mining by drawing attention to the issue through protests involving trespass on the property of mining companies. By locking down to machinery on mine sites, occupying trees in the blast zone, or blockading haul roads to mine sites, protesters associated with Climate Ground Zero directly interfere with mining practices. Other protests draw attention to the alleged negligence of regulatory agencies such as the West Virginia Department of Environmental Protection (WVDEP) or the federal Environmental Protection Agency (EPA) by occupying the offices of these governmental organizations. Climate Ground Zero has been referenced in the New York Times, Los Angeles Times, Washington Post, Democracy Now, and the Associated Press.

== History ==
Climate Ground Zero began in February 2009 as a local extension of the regional network Mountain Justice, a coalition of anti-MTR groups across Appalachia that formed in the summer of 2005.Mike Roselle, co-founder of Earth First!, the Rainforest Action Network, and the Ruckus Society, moved to the coalfields of West Virginia upon the request of local activists when the last mountain to remain untouched by MTR mining, Coal River Mountain, was clear-cut in preparation for mining. On January 3, 2009, in what became the first protest of the campaign, Mike Roselle, James McGuinness, Glen Collins, Rory McIlmoil and Matthew Noerpel were arrested for chaining themselves to a bulldozer on Coal River Mountain. Later that day, eight local residents of the Coal River Valley and supporters from across Appalachia were arrested at Massey Energy subsidiary, Marfork Coal’s office, carrying a letter demanding that all strip mining on Coal River Mountain cease immediately. Since then over 100 arrests have taken place as a part of various protests associated with Climate Ground Zero.

== Legal repercussions ==
=== Criminal ===
When the campaign first began, the protesters were simply cited for trespass and released. While some protesters still only receive fines for their actions, others have been sentenced to jail time of up to 60 days. The bail amounts have also increased. Founder Mike Roselle received a $7,500 cash-only bail for locking down to Marfork’s main office in February 2009 and Benjamin Bryant each received a $100,000 cash-only bail for blockading the entrance to Massey’s Regional Headquarters in Boone County on May 17, 2010. Martin and Bryant’s bails were each lowered to county bonds of $2500 after public outcry and several bail reduction hearings.

=== Civil ===
Massey Energy, the owner of the majority of MTR sites in West Virginia, has also filed various civil lawsuits against the protesters, seeking to bar the trespassers from Massey’s property with temporary restraining orders and injunctions, as well as receive compensation for the alleged damages the protests caused. Through these civil suits, Massey has tried to ban from their property not only the named trespassers, but also their "officers, agents, servants, employees, and attorneys and other persons who are in active concert or participation with anyone described herein, who receive actual notice of it by personal service or otherwise." The protesters argue that these restraining orders and injunctions are overly broad in those that they attempt to enjoin and that they violate their first amendment rights. As the protesters’ attorneys Thomas Rist and Roger Forman state in an appeal to the West Virginia Supreme Court, the "TROs are incredible in the illegality of their scope and effectively curtail all free-speech activities."

== Actions of the campaign ==
The actions of the campaign vary from weeklong tree-sits on mine sites to simple line-crossings and banner drops outside of corporate offices. The longest action of the campaign so far occurred in January 2010 when Eric Blevins, David Smith, and Amber Nitchman, occupied trees Massey Energy’s Bee Tree Surface Mine on Coal River Mountain, stopping blasting on that part of the site for nine days. A similar protest occurred in August 2009 when two protesters, Laura Steepleton and Nick Stocks, occupied trees for six days within 300 feet of Massey Energy’s Edwight mine site. The protest was in response to the DEP’s refusal to respond to complaints filed by residents of Pettry Bottom, the community below the Edwight mine site, in response to landslides and flyrock coming from the site onto their property.

Some protests involve multiple sites, such as the action on May 23, 2009. Seventeen people, excluding Congressman Ken Hechler whom the State police refused to arrest, were arrested for laying out a banner on the Brushy Fork Sludge Impoundment, locking down to machinery on the Kayford Mountain mine site, and trespassing on Massey’s property. The Brushy Fork Impoundment has become controversial in light of past impoundment failures, such as the Martin County Sludge Spill and the Buffalo Creek Disaster, as well as its position above a honeycomb of abandoned mines within 100 feet of an active blast zone.

Massey Energy has been the favored target of the protests as the top coal producer in Central Appalachia and an active proponent of mountaintop removal coal mining. There have been two blockades at Massey’s Regional Headquarters in Boone County as well as a lockdown to the office of Marfork Coal, a subsidy company of Massey, in Raleigh County. One of those arrested for the first blockade of Massey’s Regional Headquarters also led a march of senior citizens from the capitol at Charleston to Massey’s Mammoth mine site in Kanawha County. The 81-year-old headed the five-day march for a total of 25 miles. In the summer of 2010, four activists shut down a highwall mining machine on Coal River Mountain. Climate Ground Zero was also a part of the largest national protest to end mountaintop removal, Appalachia Rising, which resulted in over 100 arrests. Most recently, in a combined Mountain Justice and Climate Ground Zero event, 44 people walked onto a reclaimed mine site on Kayford Mountain to plant trees and hang banners critical of MTR and current reclamation practices.

== Celebrity participation ==
Eminent figures such as NASA scientist James Hansen, Hollywood actress Daryl Hannah, former U.S. Congressman Ken Hechler, Co-director of Coal River Mountain Watch and Goldman Prize winner Julia Bonds, Sierra Club director Michael Brune, have been arrested as part of the campaign. Other notable participants include local celebrities Vernon Haltom, Co-director of Coal River Mountain Watch, Larry Gibson, founder of the Keeper of the Mountains Foundation, Lorelei Scarbro, head of the Coal River Wind Project, and Chuck Nelson, full-time volunteer for the Ohio Valley Environmental Coalition and Alliance for Appalachia.
