= Tarbotton =

Tarbotton is a surname. Notable people with the surname include:

- Teddy Tarbotton
- Marriott Ogle Tarbotton
- Jim Tarbotton
- Rebecca Tarbotton
