= Billy Parish =

American activist and writer

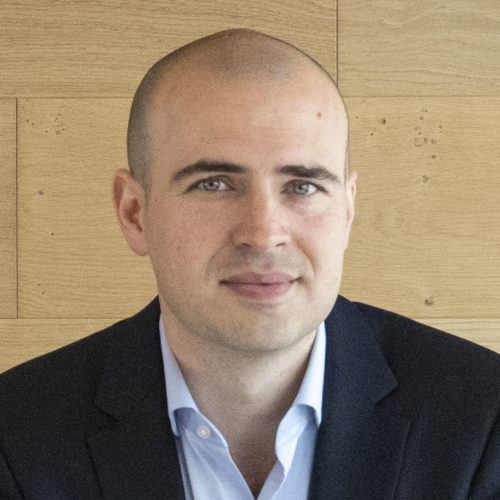
- Billy Parish
- Born: Billy Parish; September 11, 1981 (age 45); New York, New York, U.S.
- Education: Yale University, The Mountain School
- Occupations: Co-founder & Executive Chairman of Mosaic; author; activist
- Years active: 2003 - present
- Spouse: Married

Billy Parish (born September 11, 1981) is an American environmental entrepreneur, author, and activist. He is the founder and CEO of Hyfin, a platform that builds funds to enable the mass adoption of clean energy technologies globally. He previously founded Mosaic Inc., one of the largest clean energy finance companies in the U.S.

== Early life ==
Parish grew up in Manhattan, New York City. His father, a lawyer, specialized in finance for electronic utilities. His mother, also a lawyer, met his father while working on a securitization deal. He spent a semester of high school at The Mountain School in Vermont, where he was turned on to working for the environment. In July 2005 he led a three-day fast in front of the White House to draw attention to the 150,000 deaths caused each year by climate change. He designed his own major in sustainable economic development at Yale University. However, in 2002, he left Yale University and went on to found the Energy Action Coalition, renamed the Power Shift Network. The Coalition became the largest youth-led clean energy advocacy network in the world, bringing together 50 environmental and social justice groups and over 340,000 members. The coalition raised nearly $10 million in four years and helped more than 600 colleges make commitments to climate neutrality.

In March 2009, the Energy Action Coalition organized Power Shift '09, which brought over 12,000 young people to Washington, D.C., for the largest climate-focused training, lobby day and, non-violent civil disobedience action in U.S. history. 1Sky states Parish is on the board of directors. He is also co-chair of SolarAPP+ and board member and former board chair at The Solutions Project.

== Career ==
Parish played a leading role in creating the Clean Energy Corps proposal to create 5 million new green jobs in the U.S., which was incorporated into the American Recovery and Reinvestment Act in 2009. He also helped to expand the AmeriCorps public service program to include a new “Clean Energy Service Corps”. With the idea that crowdfunding could affect a shift to green energy, Parish co-founded Mosaic. At that time, the company allowed individuals to micro invest in community-scale solar projects. In 2014, Parish shifted the company's focus from crowdfunding to financing for residential solar projects, and in 2018, expanded to sustainable home improvements.

Under Parish's leadership, Mosaic provided more than $15 billion in loans, enabling over 500,000 households to adopt solar, batteries, and energy-efficient upgrades, and financed roughly 10 percent of U.S. residential solar capacity. Mosaic created the industry's first 20-year solar loan and, in 2017, completed the first securitization of residential solar loans. Parish transitioned to Executive Chair in 2023 to focus on strategy, partnerships, and policy initiatives.

In 2025, Parish founded Hyfin, where he is CEO, building a platform to accelerate investment in climate solutions.

== Personal life ==
Parish lives in Berkeley, California, with his wife and two daughters.

== Awards and honors ==
- 2017 – Rolling Stone's 25 People Shaping The Future
- 2014 – Fast Company's "20th Most Creative People in Business"
- 2012 – Middlebury College CSE Vision Award
- 2005 – Rolling Stone Magazine "Climate Hero"
- 2004 – Brower Youth Award
- 2007 – Elected as a Fellow by Ashoka, the global association of the world's leading social entrepreneurs

== Writing ==
Parish has written over 50 articles for publications including Inc., The Atlantic, HuffPost, and Grist.

- Making Good: Finding Meaning, Money & Community in a Changing World (ISBN 978-1605290782)
