= Quentin James =

American political organizer and strategist

Quentin James is an American political organizer and strategist.

James was born in Greenville, South Carolina. He dropped out of college in 2007 to join Barack Obama's presidential campaign within which he participated in early organizing efforts. After Obama's victory, he returned to education and earned a earned Bachelor of Arts in Africana studies from Howard University. In 2013, he co-founded Vestige Strategies, a political consulting firm, with his wife Stefanie Brown James, a former Obama campaign aide. In 2016, the couple founded The Collective PAC, a political action committee supporting African American candidates and increasing Black voter participation. According to James, who became the PAC's president, he "wanted to help turn the energy feeding Black Lives Matter protests into something more durable: greater political representation."

In the lead-up to the withdrawal of Joe Biden from the 2024 United States presidential election, James argued that not voicing support for Biden amidst calls for his withdrawal means disregarding the will of Black voters, who had significantly supported his nomination, and said if Biden steps down, Kamala Harris is the only viable alternative for the Democratic Party. Following this, after Harris announced her campaign on July 21, he was one of the chief political organizers in a coordinated effort to raise millions of dollars for her campaign during its first week. This was followed by a $4 million initiative to increase voter turnout among Black men. As election day was nearing, James was critical of some aspects of funding and strategy broadly on the Democratic side: He criticized Michael Bloomberg's "late money" approach whereby he looks for "unmet needs" after most other major donors have donated, and Future Forward PAC's "ad-making laboratory" concept whereby many ads are produced at great cost but only a fraction are aired—in order to create the most precisely targeted late advertising—as ineffective, saying: "time, not late money, is always our best weapon—but that’s where we are this cycle". After Harris lost the election, James commented: "Donald Trump increased his margins at the ballot box with men of color, with people of color overall, so there is something to this notion that people wanted change ... but I think that the issue here is that the change they're going to get is not what they were expecting."

James served on the National Board of Directors for the NAACP from 2009 to 2013. He has also held leadership roles with the Sierra Club's Sierra Student Coalition and worked for Ready for Hillary.
