= Mountain Justice =

Mountain Justice may refer to:

- Mountain Justice (1915 film), starring Lon Chaney, Sr.
- Mountain Justice (1930 film), directed by Harry Joe Brown
- Mountain Justice (1937 film), directed by Michael Curtiz
- Mountain Justice (organization) is an organization which demands justice for Appalachia
