= CGZ =

CGZ may refer to:

- Climate Ground Zero, an American non-violent civil disobedience campaign against mountaintop removal mining
- CGZ, the IATA and FAA LID code for Casa Grande Municipal Airport, Arizona, United States
