= Mosaic Inc. =

Solar crowdfunding company

Solar Mosaic.

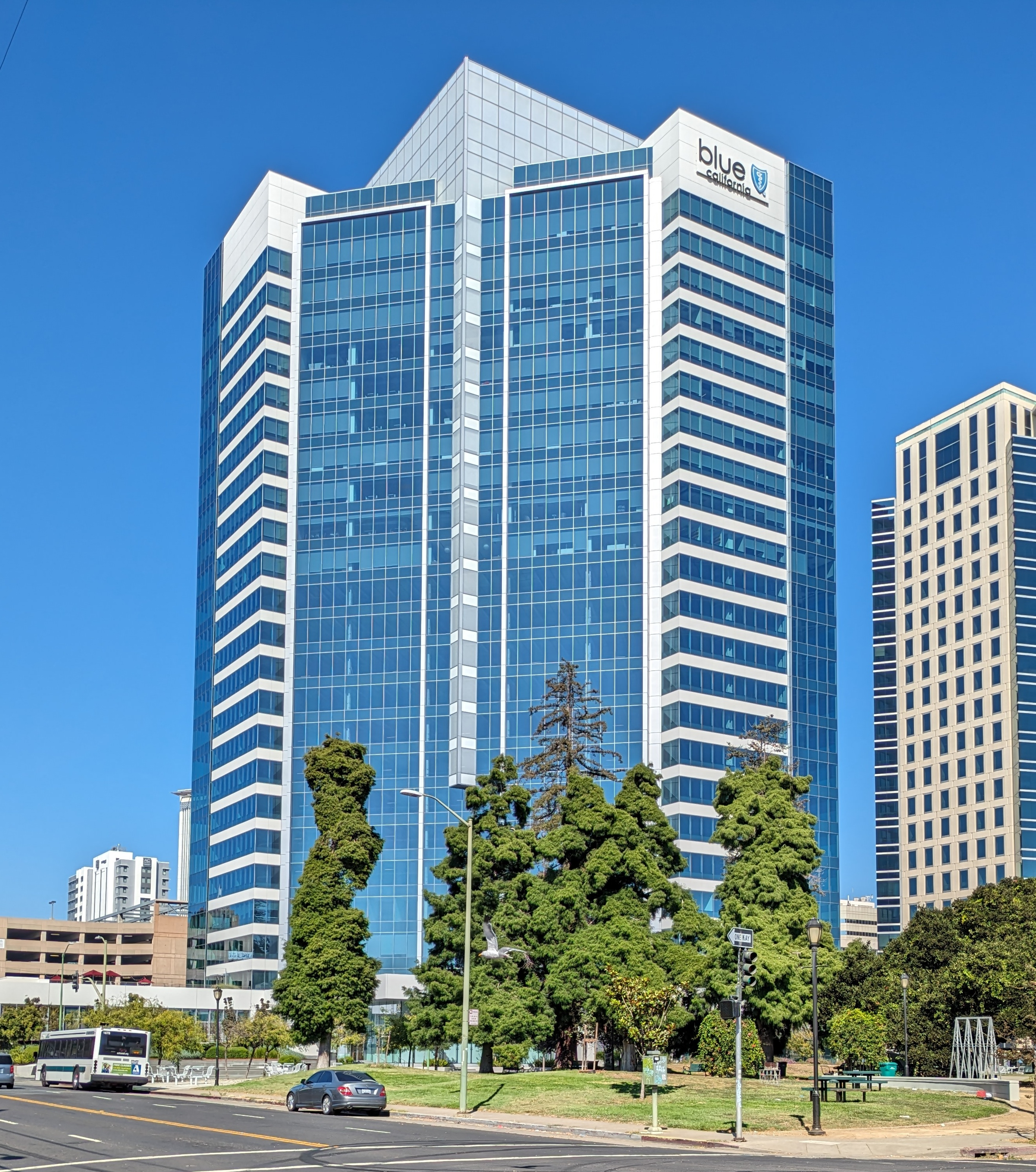
- Location of Mosaic at 601 City Center, Oakland
- Type: Private
- Industry: Financing
- Founded: 2010
- Headquarters: 601 12th Street, Suite 325, Oakland, California, 94607 U.S.
- Key people: Patrick Moore — CEO; Dan Budington — CFO; Billy Parish — founder & executive chair of board
- Website: joinmosaic.com

Solar Mosaic is a sustainable energy financing company based in Oakland, California. Founded in 2010, Mosaic created its initial business model using crowdfunding principals to offer loans for commercial solar development projects. After shifting its model in 2014, Mosaic is now focused on financing residential solar projects by leveraging third party capital partners. Through this model, the company aims to democratize the social and environmental benefits of sustainable energy.

== History ==
=== Early projects ===
Billy Parish, Dan Rosen, Arthur Coulston, and Steve Richmond originally started Mosaic to facilitate crowdfunding of loans for solar development projects. Initially, Mosaic facilitated approximately $1.1 million from 400 private investors. The organization used the investment to finance 12 rooftop solar plants in California, New Jersey, and Arizona.

In Spring 2012, Mosaic financed five solar power plants through their zero-interest investment model. 400 people invested over $350,000 in these projects which created 73 kW of solar energy for local community organizations—saving the organizations more than $600,000 on their utility bills while producing over 2,700 job hours for local workers.

In September 2012, Mosaic financed its first solar power plant that also offered a return on investment for investors. 51 people raised over $40,000 to finance this 47 kW project for the Youth Employment Partnership in Oakland, California. With a 6.38% annual return over a 5 year loan period, a $200 investment would yield $272 by the end of the 5 years.

=== Public launch ===
In January 2013, Mosaic launched an online platform to let individuals invest US$25 or over in specific solar projects while earning a 4.5% annual return. Mosaic provided capital to developers at a 5.5% interest rate, took a 1% fee, and investors could expect a full return of their investment in nine years. Mosaic sold out its first public projects in less than 24 hours, with over 400 investors putting in $313,000 and an average investment of $700.

In April 2013, Mosaic announced that it had received approval to sell $100 million worth of solar investments to the California public. As part of the announcement, Mosaic released another project on the Ronald McDonald House in San Diego.

On March 6, 2014, Mosaic announced that it would begin offering crowdfunded loans to homeowners who would like to install solar.

=== 2015-2021 ===
Mosaic has been financing residential loans for solar systems by leveraging third party capital providers since 2014. Since this shift, Mosaic has continued to grow in the solar financing space, in large part because of this additional raised capital.

Mosaic's first major round of capital came in October 2014 with reinsurer PartnerRe, funding $100 million of Mosaic home solar loans. These funds were directed at expanding its lending system. In 2014, it was one of the first companies to pioneer solar lending by combining one of the industry's first 20-year solar loans with fully digital financing.

In 2016, Mosaic introduced a battery-only loan. In 2017, the company introduced a 25-year loan and expanded into other sustainable home improvement verticals. In 2019, Mosaic introduced a product to enable the purchase of solar with other bundled improvements, including roofs, windows, and doors. Over the course of 2016, Mosaic raised $200 million between Germany's DZ Bank and New York Green Bank and a separate $220 million equity financing in Series C funding through private equity firm Warburg Pincus.

In 2020, the company introduced a first-of-its-kind sustainable home improvement loan with up to 18 months of deferred interest and payments followed by repayment terms up to 25 years.

=== Bankruptcy ===
On June 6, 2025, Mosaic filed for Chapter 11 bankruptcy protection due to significant losses as a result from macroeconomic conflicts and rising interest rates.

In September 2025, the company's assets were sold to Solar Servicing with plans to continue operations under new ownership.

=== Controversies ===
Since 2019, the company has been the target of claims of using its financial structure to scam homeowners with fraudulent loans, leading to lawsuits demanding over $3 million from consumers in California alone, with other lawsuits coming from consumers and State Attorneys General in nearly 30 states. On March 8, 2024 the Minnesota Attorney General filed suit against Mosaic and three other lending companies (GoodLeap, Sunlight Financial, and Dividend Solar Finance—a subsidiary of Fifth Third Bank), following an investigation that uncovered they charged Minnesotans $35 million in hidden fees on nearly 5000 loans to finance sales of residential solar panels. The lawsuit alleges the lenders violated Minnesota state laws against deceptive trade practices, deceptive lending, and illegally high rates of interest.

== Funding ==
=== 2012 ===
- Mosaic raised $3.4 million in Series A funding.
- The US Department of Energy awards Mosaic an additional $2 million grant from as part of the SunShot Initiative.

=== 2014 ===
- Mosaic raised $100 million through reinsurer PartnerRe

=== 2016 ===
- Mosaic raised $200 million in warehouse financing through Germany's DZ Bank and the New York Green Bank
- Mosaic raised $220 million in equity financing through private equity firm Warburg Pincus

== See also ==
- Renewable energy in the United States
