= Power Shift Network =

Youth environmental justice organisation

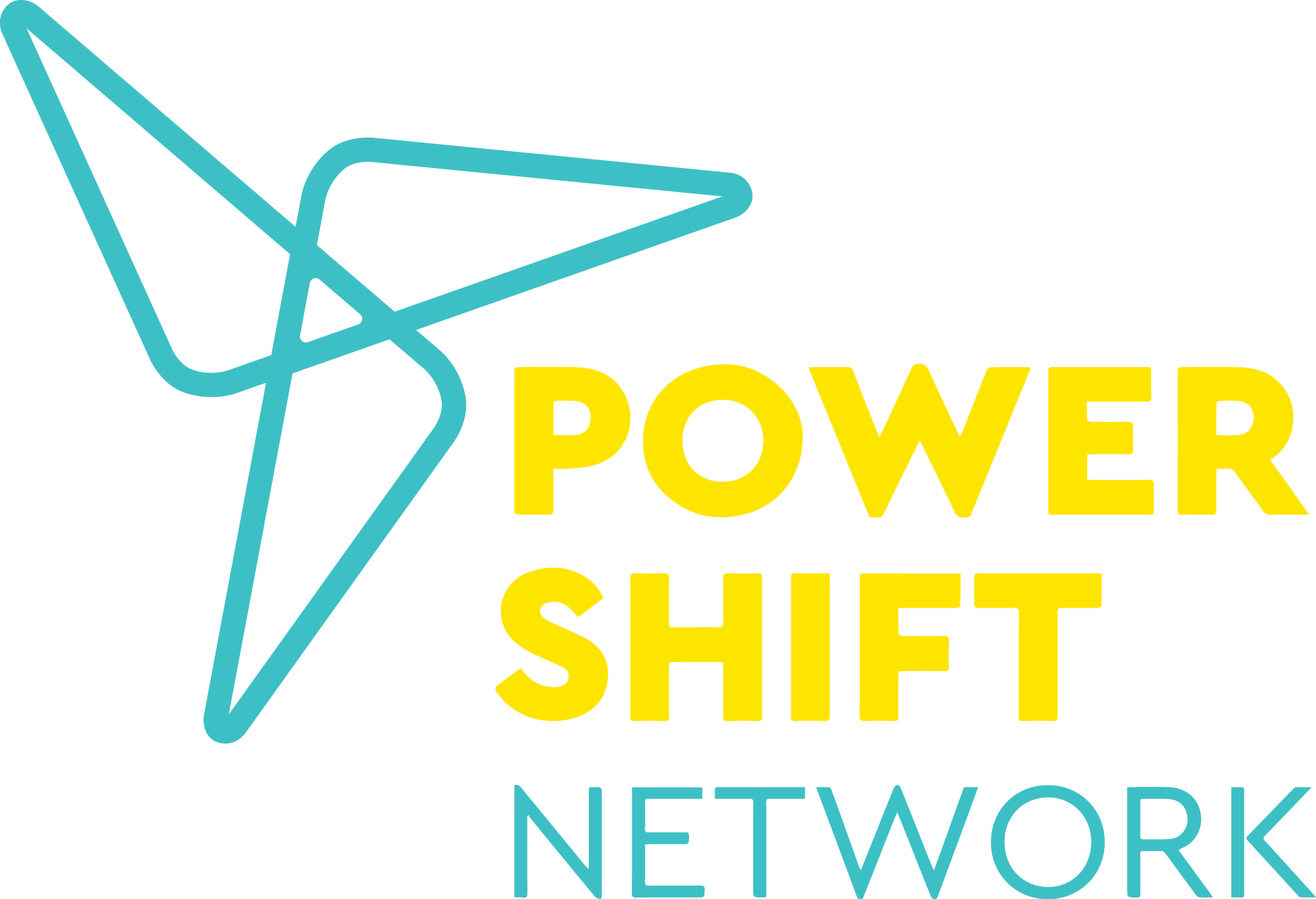
- Power Shift Network logo
- Founded: 2004; Washington, D.C., United States
- Type: 501(c)(3)
- Purpose: Environmentalism, global warming, renewable energy, climate justice
- Location: United States
- Method: Direct action, lobbying, petition, demonstration
- Key people: Eriqah Vincent, Co-Executive Director, Saren Glenn, Co-Executive Director
- Website: powershift.org
- Formerly called: Energy Action Coalition

Power Shift Network is a North American non-profit organization made up of a network of youth-led social and environmental justice organizations working together to build the youth clean energy and climate movement. It runs campaigns in the United States and Canada to build grassroots power and advocate for tangible changes on climate change and social justice at local, state, national and international levels in North America. The organization changed its name from Energy Action Coalition in July 2016 in order to reflect its new leadership and it shift from a coalition to a network structure. The Power Shift Network's members, which include other non-profit organizations and student groups focused on environmental justice, social justice, and climate change, focus their organizing and campaigns on campuses, communities, corporate practices, and politics. The Power Shift Network is part of the Global Youth Climate Movement.

The Power Shift Network was founded (as Energy Action Coalition) in June 2004 at a meeting of representatives from almost 20 environmental groups in Washington, D.C. The founding of the organization was a result of the coordination of many local and national environmental networks in a day of action on April 1, 2004, called Fossil Fools Day which advocated for reducing dependence for energy on fossil fuels, with more than 125 registered actions around the U.S.

== Structure ==
The Power Shift Network is a growing network of student and youth-led environmental, climate, and social justice partner organizations. The network has six full-time staff and an office in Washington, D.C.

The following organizations are a few of the 91 (as of February 2020) members of the network:

- 350.org
- Chesapeake Climate Action Network
- Earth Guardians
- Global Zero
- Zero Hour
- Grand Aspirations
- Sierra Student Coalition
- Green For All
- Organize Florida Education Fund
- Groundswell
- iMatter
- National Wildlife Federation EcoLeaders
- North American Students of Cooperation (NASCO)
- Oil Change International
- Rainforest Action Network
- Real Food Challenge
- Sierra Student Coalition
- Future Coalition
- SustainUS
- Care About Climate
- Campaign For America
- Our Climate Voices
- Our Climate
- United States Student Association (USSA)

== Campaigns and events ==
=== Fossil Fools Day ===
The first Fossil Fools Day on April 1, 2004, was not a project of the Energy Action Coalition, but with over 125 actions coordinated by numerous organizations, it precipitated the formation of the coalition the following June. The day of action featured demonstrations promoting renewable energy and protesting President George W. Bush's energy plan.

The second Fossil Fools Day on April 1, 2005, promoted in the United States and Canada by the Energy Action Coalition included more than 300 actions in Canada and the U.S., and actions in England, Nigeria and Panama. One example of the a student organized event was as a bike ride organized by Middlebury College students and included students from Green Mountain College and the University of Vermont from Burlington, Vermont, to Montpelier, Vermont, the state capital to lobby lawmakers.

Every year since 2004 and the founding of Energy Action, young people from around the U.S. and Canada have continued the collective day of action on April 1 to confront the fossil fuel industry and lobby politicians. Hundreds of campuses and communities have participated by hosting a variety of lobby and campaign events, film screenings, and protests at dirty energy sites.

=== The Campus Climate Challenge ===
Energy Action Coalition (the former name of the Power Shift Network) launched the Campus Climate Challenge in 2006 to spur a new wave of investment in renewable energy on college campuses from coast to coast. The campaign spread to over 700 colleges and universities across the country, and more than 550 of those campuses have made institutional commitments to become carbon neutral.

=== Power Shift 2007 ===
The first national youth climate conference, Power Shift '07, took place from November 2 to 5, 2007, with between 5,000 and 6,000 students and young people in attendance. The summit featured workshops, expert panels, and speakers at the University of Maryland, College Park, a rally of between 2,000 and 3,000 people on the steps of the Capitol building and a Lobby Day. The aim of the conference was to urge elected officials to pass legislation which would include three planks taken from the platform of the climate advocacy coalition 1Sky:

- The creation of a 5 million-strong Clean Energy Job Corps
- The reduction of greenhouse gases to 80 percent below 1990 levels by 2050, which scientists say is the baseline for mitigating the worst effects of global warming
- A moratorium on new coal plants and divestment from fossil fuel and highway subsidies.

The conference included workshops, panel discussions, and speakers focusing on addressing climate change and building a strong youth movement around clean energy and environmental justice. Keynote speakers included Van Jones, Bill McKibben, Ralph Nader, and Speaker of the House Nancy Pelosi.

=== Power Vote 2008 ===
The 2008 election season, Energy Action Coalition ran the Power Vote campaign to harness the power of the youth vote for clean and just energy and good green jobs. Powervote was a major player at both the Democratic and Republican National Conventions, was formally endorsed and supported by renowned NASA climatologist James Hansen, had a large presence at each of the presidential and vice presidential debates, was a featured project of Bill Clinton's Clinton Global Initiative, and hosted Al Gore in a live nationwide webcast. Over 350,000 young people got involved in the movement as climate voters and new leaders. Youth voters involved in the campaign raised the prominence of climate change as one of the key issues in the election and generated 100 of media stories.

=== Power Shift 2009 ===
Energy Action held a second national youth climate summit, Power Shift 2009 which took place February 27 through March 2, 2009, in Washington, D.C. The event drew over 12,000 student and youth climate activists, representing all 50 U.S. states, all Canadian provinces, and 13 other nations including Brazil, Austria, the United Kingdom. The goal of the conference was to "push the Obama administration and Congress to pass 'bold, comprehensive, and just national climate legislation before entering international climate negotiations in December 2009.'" The official Power Shift 2009 website states that the conference will bring 10,000 students and young people together to:

- Push the new administration and the United States Congress to pass bold, comprehensive, and just national climate legislation before entering international climate negotiations in December 2009.
- Develop a comprehensive movement strategy for 1.) continued and increased political pressure and accountability and 2.) a uniform vision/direction that helps facilitate the development and implementation of individual and group action plans for the overall growth of the clean energy movement.
- Strengthen bonds between diverse youth constituencies.
- Train and empower participants with the skills needed to create one movement that tackles climate change, environmental injustice, and economic failure.
- Connect with fellow organizers and build community to strengthen our movement and sustain participant involvement over the long-run.
- Understand the magnitude of both the challenges and opportunities at hand (climate, socioeconomic injustice, personal, etc.) and explore our own capacities to create transformative change.

The Power Shift '09 Conference was the largest gathering of young people to solve the climate crisis in history. Meeting with key strategic members in Congress, these young activists were told that they (congress) was ready to start promoting the essential legislation to achieve the just energy future we all deserve, but they needed a force (they specifically asked for an "army") on the ground spreading the word and gaining support. Power Shift '09 gathered over 12,000 to demonstrate that the youth climate movement is that "army".

=== The Power Shift '09 Summer Campaign ===
The Power Shift '09 Summer Campaign leveraged the momentum generated from the conference to organize a coordinated national initiative aimed at advancing comprehensive climate and energy policy in 2009. the campaign focused on mobilizing thousands of young people across the country to support the urgent need for impactful climate legislation.

=== Regional Power Shifts in 2009 ===
Thousands of young people rallied across the United States in the Fall of 2009 for the Power Shift '09 Regional Summits: 11 massive gatherings to exercise the political power of young voters and ask then President Obama and Congress to pass a clean energy jobs plan by December to rebuild the economy, end the dependence on dirty energy, and bring America lasting security.

- Indiana Power Shift, Oct. 10-11, Carmel, IN
- Michigan Power Shift, Oct. 9-11, Michigan State University, Lansing, MI
- Missouri Power Shift, Oct. 16-18, St. Louis University, St. Louis, MO
- Carolinas Power Shift, Oct 16-18, University of North Carolina Chapel Hill, Chapel Hill, NC
- Northern Plains Power Shift, Oct 23-25, North Dakota State University, Fargo, ND
- Pennsylvania Power Shift, Oct 23-25, Penn State University, State College, PA
- Virginia Power Shift, Oct 23-25, George Mason University, Fairfax, VA
- Appalachia Power Shift, Oct 23-25, Marshall University, Huntington, WV
- Florida Power Shift, Oct 23-25, University of Central Florida, Orlando, FL
- Ohio Power Shift, Nov 6-8, Oberlin College, Oberlin, OH
- Power Shift West, Nov 6-8, University of Oregon, Eugene, OR

At the time of the summits, the Senate was working on the Waxman-Markey bill for carbon emissions trading, and President Obama was preparing to head to the 2009 United Nations Climate Change Conference in Copenhagen.

=== Power Shift 2011 ===
The third American Power Shift took place April 15 to 18, 2011, in Washington, D.C., at the Walter E. Washington Convention Center. The conference had over 10,000 attenders. People came to support various environmental movements, many in protest of President Barack Obama's alleged weakness on environmental issues. Guest speakers included former U.S. vice-president Al Gore, Greenpeace Executive Director Phil Radford, and environmental advocate Van Jones.

After the 2011 Power Shift conference concluded in April, Energy Action Coalition launched WeArePowerShift.org, a "grassroots-driven online community for the organizers powering our movement. The website continues to serve as an online hub for Energy Action Coalition's staff, partners, and allies within the broader youth climate movement.

=== Power Shift 2013 ===
The fourth Power Shift conference in the US was also the first outside of Washington. It was instead held in Pittsburgh, Pennsylvania, at the David L. Lawrence Convention Center on October 19–21, 2013. Keynote speakers included Gasland director Josh Fox, Sierra Club director Michael Brune, and Kandi Mossett of the Indigenous Environmental Network. The program included a rally against coal production and the organization of protests against the Keystone XL Pipeline.

=== Power Shift 2016 and Name Change ===
In 2016, Energy Action Coalition chose to host four regional convergences, smaller than the large national gatherings of previous years. This decision was made by design, with a stated aim to "help amplify the voice and power of our local communities, and leverage that power to help the climate justice movement win at the national level."

At the first of the four Power Shifts in 2016, which took place in Philadelphia on July 23–24, 2016, Executive Director Lydia Avila announced the organization's official name change from Energy Action Coalition to the Power Shift Network.

The remaining three 2016 Power Shifts were hosted in Detroit, Orlando, and Berkeley between August and October 2016.

== See also ==
- Environmental groups and resources serving K–12 schools
- Environmental movement in the United States
- Indian Youth Climate Network
- Power Shift
- Youth Climate Movement
