= Cool the Earth =

American non-profit organization

- Formation: 2007
- Founder: Carleen and Jeff Cullen
- Type: Nonprofit
- Purpose: Environment
- Headquarters: Kentfield, California, U.S.
- Executive director: Carleen Cullen
- Vice president: Jeff Cullen
- Board of directors: Lawrie Mott; Mary Bryan; Bruce Bell; Jeff Cullen; Robert Frankus; Carleen Cullen; April Dean; Bitsa Freeman
- Website: https://cooltheearth.org/

Cool the Earth Inc. is a nonprofit educational organization based in Kentfield, California. Cool the Earth's purpose is to educate children and their families about climate change and encourage them to take simple, quantifiable steps at home to reduce their carbon footprints. Currently, the organization provides programming to over 500 elementary schools countrywide.

== History ==
Cool the Earth was founded in 2007 by Carleen and Jeff Cullen in Kentfield, California. After watching Al Gore's documentary film on climate change, An Inconvenient Truth, the Cullens held screenings of the film for parents in their community and directed discussions on how to fight climate change. Parent volunteers and teachers from 25 elementary and middle schools joined the Cullens to establish Cool the Earth. The organization launched its first program at Anthony G. Bacich Elementary School in Kentfield.

Since 2007, Cool the Earth has engaged individuals in 323,000 carbon-saving actions and reached over 500,000 students and their families across 31 states and 5 countries—eliminating over 40 million pounds of carbon from Earth's atmosphere.

In 2019, Cool the Earth launched a collaborative campaign with other California organizations called Drive Clean Bay Area (now Ride and Drive Clean) with the goal of helping consumers reduce their carbon emissions by switching to electric vehicles and electric bicycles. Ride and Drive Clean's approach is data-driven and structured with Cool the Earth providing data services, marketing, and program development; NGOs Acterra, Charge Across Town, and 350 Bay Area acting as strategic program partners; and over 50 cities, utilities, NGOs, and agencies acting as promotion partners in their communities.

== Method ==
Cool the Earth uses a child-driven model to motivate families to conserve energy and resources. The first major National Household Survey on Global Warming has cited this model, in which the family acts together, as one of the most effective methods to create positive environmental change. Cool the Earth engages children at school and gives them the tools to inspire their parents so that the whole family reduces their carbon footprint. The program is built around community action.

The organization has established partnerships with the Bay Area Air Board, the Chabot Space and Science Center, Marin Community Foundation, Conservation Corps North Bay (formerly Marin Conservation Corps), Strategic Energy Innovations, Marin Municipal Water District, Safe Routes to School, and Al Gore’s Climate Reality Project.

=== Program ===
Currently available for free to any elementary school in the US, the Cool the Earth program launches with a school-wide assembly featuring an age-appropriate play, which educates children about global warming and empowers them to take 20 low or no-cost actions to reduce their energy use at home. Since the pandemic hit, Cool the Earth has revamped their program, making it fully online and available to any child or family to access.

The 3-5 month program measures the actions the children and their families take from a coupon book which goes home with the kids, and celebrates the results on a visible banner at school. This program is available to any elementary school in the country and was developed in both English and Spanish. The program has already motivated over 250,000 kids and their families to take over 323,000 actions to reduce their carbon emissions, eliminating over 60 million pounds of global warming gases from the atmosphere.

Aimed at kindergartners through eighth-graders, Cool the Earth is helping students at more than 500 schools reuse, recycle and conserve by making small changes—both at school and at home.

== Ride and Drive Clean ==
Ride and Drive Clean (formerly Drive Clean Bay Area) provides programming in workplaces, schools, and communities that focuses on moving individuals to drive electric vehicles and/or commit to making their next car electric. The program uses life cycle analysis, sometimes known as "cradle-to-grave," to segment their marketing and programs to best help the consumer move to electric.

== Awards ==
- American Institute for Public Service Jefferson Award (2008)
- California Air Resources Board Excellence Award (2009)
- Breathe California Clean Air Award (2009)
- CoolCalifornia.org Small Business Award (2009)
- Metropolitan Transportation Commission Grand Award (2010)
- Bay Area Air Quality Management District James Cary Smith Community Grant Program Award (2016)

== See also ==
- Education in the United States
- Environment of the United States
- Environmental groups and resources serving K–12 schools
