= Education Facilities Clearinghouse =

Program of the United States Department of Education

The Education Facilities Clearinghouse (EFC) is a program of the United States Department of Education (DoED) which provides support to educational facilities "on issues related to planning, design, financing, construction, improvement, operation, and maintenance" through technical assistance and training as well as dissemination of research on these issues. The program was established in 1998 and in the past has been implemented as the National Clearinghouse for Educational Facilities (1998–2010) and the American Clearinghouse on Educational Facilities (2010–2013). As of 2014 it is administered by the George Washington University Graduate School of Education and Human Development and is funded through a competitive grant sponsored by the DoED.

== Program services ==
Under the administration of the George Washington University Graduate School of Education and Human Development, the EFC's scope is to identify and disseminate best practices in all areas related to education facilities, including identifying hazards and conducting vulnerability assessments. It maintains a website with resources for education facilities and the general public on planning, design, financing, construction, contract management, operations, maintenance, school safety, and environmental issues. It also provides both onsite and remote technical assistance and professional development without cost to public educational institutions from pre-kindergarten through higher education as well as to local education authorities and other state entities.

== History ==
The Education Facilities Clearinghouse initiative was established in 1998, with its continuation authorized in the Education Sciences Reform Act of 2002. In recommending authorization for its continuation and that of the Eisenhower National Clearinghouse for Mathematics and Science Education, the U.S. Senate Committee on Health, Education, Labor, and Pensions noted that both programs "provide an important service to schools and the committee encourages efforts to improve their quality and expand their use."

The program was initially implemented as the National Clearinghouse for Educational Facilities (NCEF) and was administered by the National Institute of Building Sciences, a non-governmental, non-profit organization authorized by the U.S. Congress to serve as an authoritative source on building science and technology. The NCEF's mission, funded by the US Department of Education, was to conduct and disseminate research on best practices for educational facilities. Its primary users were school administrators, facility managers, designers, and researchers. Over the years the NCEF built up a website containing a large number of resources and articles including many published by the NCEF itself.

In 2010 the DoED put further funding of the EFC to a competitive bidding process with revised priorities for the program to include the provision of onsite technical assistance to institutions, training, and distance-learning events. Although the NCEF was one of the bidders, the funds were awarded to Tarleton State University as a three-year grant to administer the program under the name American Clearinghouse on Educational Facilities (ACEF). Following the withdrawal of DoED funding, the NCEF website and its online resources have been maintained as an archive by the National Institute of Building Sciences.

Funding for implementing the EFC program was again put to a competitive bid by the DoED in July 2013, and in October of that year George Washington University's Graduate School of Education and Human Development was awarded a $2.99 million three-year grant to administer the program under the name Education Facilities Clearinghouse.

== See also ==
- Environmental groups and resources serving K–12 schools
- Massachusetts School Building Authority
