= Win the Future =

American political group

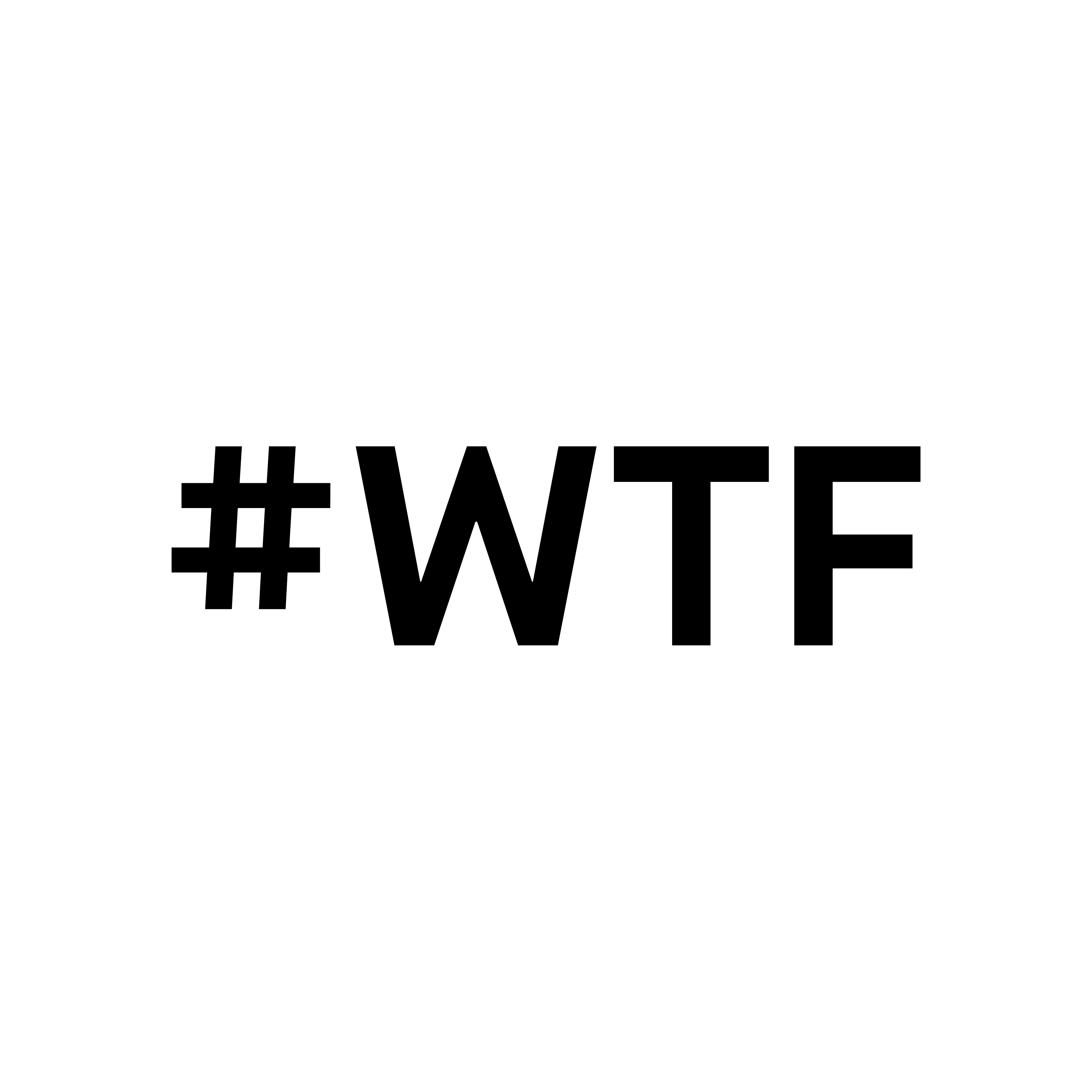
- Formation: 2017
- Website: winthefuture.com

Win the Future (WTF) is an American political organization. It was co-founded in 2017 by Reid Hoffman, Mark Pincus, and Adam Werbach following Donald Trump's election to the U.S. presidency.

== Focus ==
WTF's website says that the organization is “a non partisan project lab exploring and developing techniques to give more voice and choice to the American voter.

A December, 2018 article in the New York Times said that the group was created "to encourage every American to become an informed voter."

== Methods ==
On September 25, 2017, WTF projected a wicked-witch themed image onto the Rayburn House Office Building in Washington, D.C. calling on Congress to protect the Affordable Care Act. The group chose this theme using a summer crowdsourcing campaign where they gathered ideas from their members on social media.

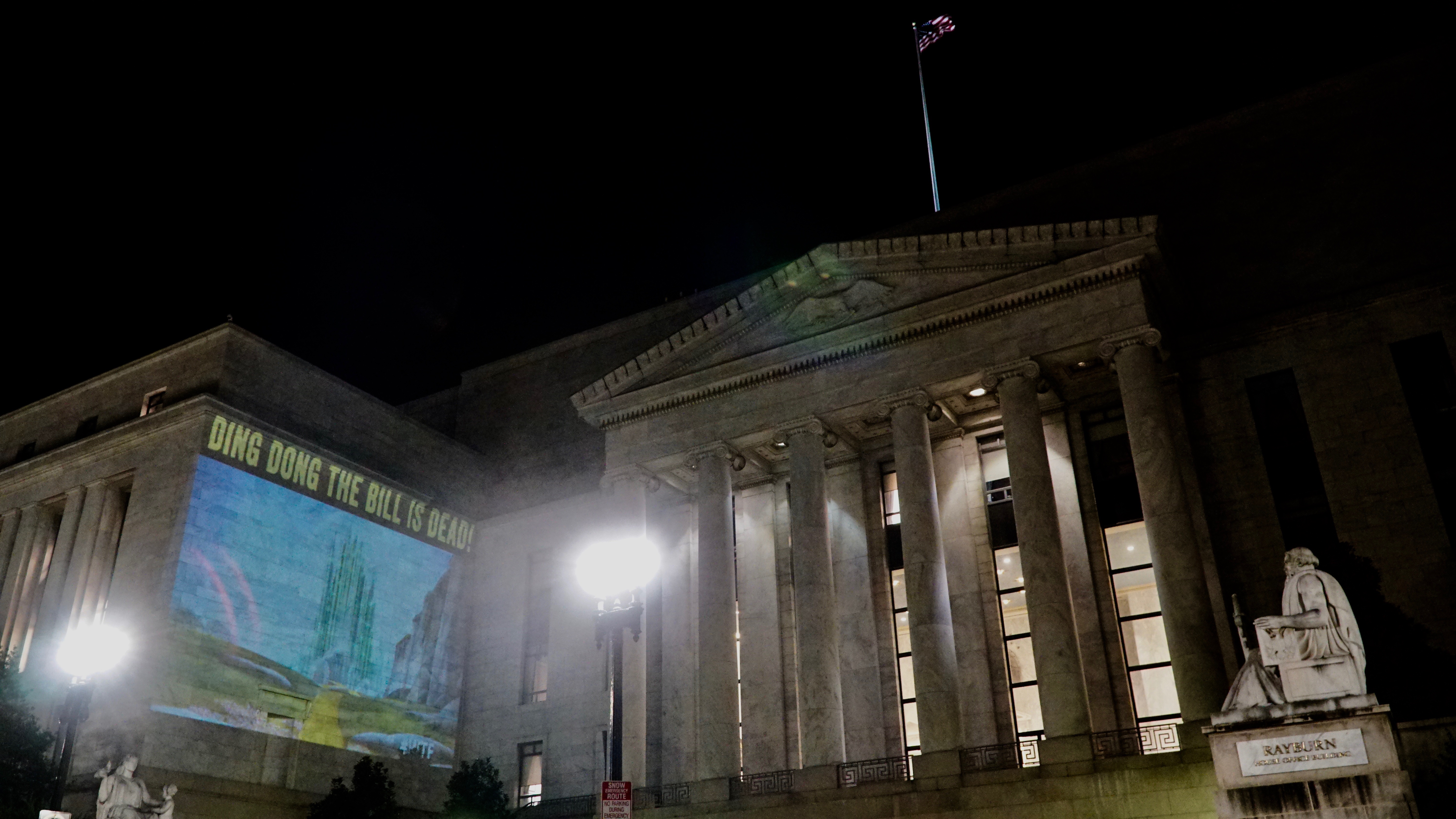
WTF projected a 70-foot digital "billboard" onto the side of the Rayburn Office Building in Washington, DC on September 25, 2017

In the 2017 mid-term elections, WTF supported first-time candidate Donte Tanner, a U.S. Air Force Veteran in his challenge to Tim Hugo, the third-ranking delegate in the Virginia General Assembly at the time, who had held the seat since 2002. Tanner was initially declared the winner by 68 votes, but late uncounted ballots caused him to narrowly lose after a recount.

In 2018, the group announced a collaboration with political comedian Samantha Bee to develop a non-partisan voter turnout game called This is Not a Game: The Game. Bee launched the game in the weeks before the 2018 U.S. midterm elections. According to Bee, the goal was "to make something that would drive voter turnout in a bipartisan way."

The game was downloaded over a million times and launched in the top five games on the Apple App Store.
