= 1Sky =

US-based organization fighting climate change

1Sky Education Fund
- Merged into: 350.org
- Formation: 2007
- Type: NGO
- Legal status: 501(c)(3)
- Purpose: Through direct lobbying by everyday Americans, creative local actions, and work in DC by the 1Sky staff, we push our elected officials to fight climate change and usher in a clean energy economy.
- Headquarters: Takoma Park, Maryland, United States
- Staff: 12
- Website: 1sky.org

1Sky was a United States–based campaign in support of federal action to stem global warming and promote renewable energy. 1Sky was founded in the spring of 2007 when thirty climate campaigners were on a retreat in the Hudson Valley of New York state. Partners included Step It Up 2007 (and its global successor 350.org), the Clinton Global Initiative, Greenpeace, Oxfam, and the Energy Action Coalition.

1Sky merged into 350.org in 2011.

== About ==
1Sky used a diverse coalition of groups and individuals in the United States to support the 1Sky Platform. President Clinton announced the 1Sky Platform at the Clinton Global Initiative in 2007. 1Sky's Board of Directors includes but is not limited to: James Speth, Billy Parish, Bill McKibben, Van Jones.

== 1Sky solutions ==
1Sky's policy platform represented what the organization calls "the scientific bottom line". The organization created three principles for policy officials and legislators to adopt for policies that, "To identify the steps that our leaders need to take in order to shift our nation away from climate change and toward the prosperity of a green economy with renewable energy resources":

- Create 5 million green jobs and pathways out of poverty by rebuilding and refueling America with a comprehensive energy efficiency mobilization including immediate investments in a clean energy infrastructure.
- Reduce global warming pollution at least 25% below current levels by 2020, and at least 80% by 2050, in line with the best science available.
- Re-power America by imposing a moratorium on new coal plants that emit global warming pollution and replacing dirty fuels with 100% renewable energy.

== 1Sky community and political actions ==
1Sky claimed more than 200,000 grassroots supporters nationwide. They also reported engagement with more than 4,200 volunteer Climate Precinct Captains in 425 Congressional directs in every state, and 19 political organizers in 26 states.

1Sky took the stance of "strengthen to support" for the 2009 American Clean Energy and Security Act and the failed 2009 Senate Clean Energy Jobs and American Power Act. The group led a call-in campaign in January 2010 with more than 3,600 calls to Senate offices to pass comprehensive climate and clean energy legislation in 2010. 1Sky was critical of the America Power Act in May 2010, stating the US Senate bill, "does not go far enough to protect our coasts from the ravages of offshore drilling... and contains provisions that will preempt strong existing state laws that crack down on carbon emissions.". The group expressed frustration at the delay of passing a Senate climate bill during the summer of 2010, stating, "1Sky activists will be mobilizing during the August congressional recess to drive that message home loud and clear. The time for solutions is now."

The organization also held "Climate Art Parties" preceding President Barack Obama's participation to the 2009 United Nations Climate Change Conference, Congressional district meetings to support the Environmental Protection Agency's regulatory influence under the Clean Air Act (United States), and awareness rallies in response to the BP Gulf oil spill. The group spoke out against the Obama Administration's lifting the 20-year-old ban on U.S. offshore oil drilling two months before the Gulf oil spill.

== See also ==
- Sustainability
- Biodiversity
- Global warming
- Individual and political action on climate change
