= Marsh Fork Elementary School =

School in West Virginia, United States

Coordinates: 37°52′40.6″N 81°31′34.6″W

Located in Rock Creek, Raleigh County, West Virginia, Marsh Fork Elementary School accommodated a student body of around 260 children. It sat 400 yards below a 385-foot dam owned by Massey Energy.

== Environmental hazards ==
Marsh Fork Elementary was threatened on two fronts. One is the coal dam that overlooked the school. If it were to fail it would result in 2.8 billion gallons of coal slurry crashing not only into the school, but also a 30 mile wide radius of the surrounding area. The second threat is a coal silo located only 150 feet away from the school that residents claim spews coal dust into the air. Parents of the children were concerned that their children were being exposed to the dust from the silo, with several parents having reported that their children were getting sick on a consistent basis after going to school.

== Fighting for relocation ==
Concerned for the safety of their children, parents across Rock Creek began to protest having the coal dust silo located so close to their school. Due to the population size of Raleigh county and the poor attendance record of other schools in the county Marsh Fork was the only school parents could send their children to. One concerned grandfather, named Ed Wiley, was spurred into action after he and his wife noticed that their granddaughter was becoming sick on an increasing basis. It did not take him long to find out that his granddaughter was not the only child who was sick on a regular basis. So he and several other concerned parents, working in tandem with activists like Appalachian Voices, Coal Mountain River Watch, Ohio Valley Environmental Coalition and others petitioned the school board for help. This petition caused the West Virginia Department of Environmental Protection to test the school to see if any coal dust was present. The test came back negative for coal dust. It took two more tests for coal dust to finally appear on a test, though this test was conducted as part of an independent study by D. Scott Simonton, rather than by the state. Wiley felt this study would prompt some action by the state but nothing occurred. Following this Wiley decided to fund raise money for the relocation of the school, which he did by walking 455 miles on foot across two states to the office of Senator Robert C. Byrd on August 2, 2006. Even though Wiley gained the support of Byrd he still had an uphill battle, for funds had to be allocated for the relocation of the school. Most of the money would have had to come from a state source and not a federal one, due to it not being a federal issue; however when asbestos was found in the school there was hope this might change. Following no action by the federal government to provide funds Senator Byrd heavily criticized Massey Energy for knowingly building their silo so close to the school. Massey Energy fought these claims but eventually donated 1 million dollars towards the construction of the new school. This amount was further increased to 1.5 million, prompted by the Annenberg Foundation donation of 2.5 million.

== Aftermath ==
After 5 years of raising money in December 2012 10.7 million dollars were raised for the relocation of Marsh Fork. The funds came from several different sources including, the Raleigh County School Board which donated a total of 3.53 million, followed by the School Building Authority of West Virginia who gave 3.146 million, then the Annenberg Foundation at 2.5 million, then Alpha Natural Resources at 1.5 million, and finally 11,000 raised by the Pennies for Promises and Coal River Mountain Watch. The Marsh Fork Elementary would open its doors again to students and faculty a year later. The new Marsh Fork is located 3 miles away from the coal slurry dam.
