= Twilly Cannon =

American environmental activist

Howard Charles Cannon III (September 23, 1955 – March 29, 2016), known as Twilly Cannon, was an American environmental and social justice activist. As a member of Greenpeace, Earth First! and a co-founder of the Ruckus Society, he was involved in numerous civil disobedience actions as well as training and skill-sharing with other activists and organizers.

Cannon was born in Newark, New Jersey to Barbara and Howard Cannon Jr. and grew up in Point Pleasant Beach, New Jersey. He attended Christian Brothers Academy in Lincroft and The Evergreen State College.

In 1977, he participated in the Seabrook, New Hampshire anti-nuke campaign, which helped stop the proliferation of U.S. nuclear power plants.

In the late 1980s, he helped stage Greenpeace actions against aluminum factories on the Saguenay and St. Lawrence rivers whose waste was killing beluga wales and threatening human health.

In the 1990s, with Greenpeace, Cannon stalked the Soviet navy as it attempted to dump a spent nuclear reactor in the Kara Sea northeast of Murmansk.

In 1995, he and Mike Roselle founded the Ruckus Society, a nonprofit organization that sponsors skill-sharing and non-violent direct action training, strategy and consultation for activists and organizers from frontline and impacted communities working on social justice, human rights, migrant rights, workers rights and environmental justice. Through his training, Cannon also helped AIDS activist groups protest anti-AIDS legislation.

He died in Brielle, New Jersey, aged 60.
