= Adam Werbach =

American environmentalist

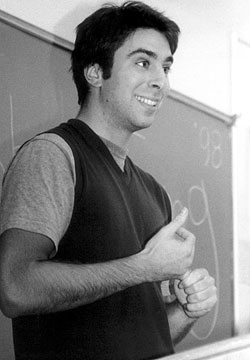
- Werbach in 1999
- Born: 1973 (age 52–53); Tarzana, California, United States
- Education: Brown University
- Occupations: Technology entrepreneur, environmental activist, author.
- Title: Global Lead for Sustainable Shopping at Amazon
- Spouse: Lyn Werbach

Adam Werbach is a technology entrepreneur, environmental activist, and author. In 1996, Werbach became the youngest person ever elected as national president of the Sierra Club, at the age of 23. He is the author of the books Act Now, Apologize Later (Harper Perennial, 1997) and Strategy for Sustainability: A Business Manifesto (Harvard Business Press, 2010). Werbach was a frequent contributor to The Atlantic, serving as the magazine's online "sustainability expert." He co-founded the re-use company Trove, and is now the Head of Digital for Kapital Entertainment.

== Early life and background ==
Werbach circulated his first petition in second grade, which led to a meeting with then Senator Al Gore where Werbach first learned about climate change. As a student at Harvard School in Studio City, Werbach began working to map unprotected areas of the California desert, and founded the Sierra Student Coalition, eventually growing it to 30,000 members in the U.S. In 1994, while a student at Brown University, Werbach led a coalition of students nationwide to pass the California Desert Protection Act, which created Death Valley National Park and Joshua Tree National Park. Werbach graduated from Brown in 1995 with a double major in Political Science and Modern Culture and Media.

== Career ==
=== Sierra Club ===
Werbach was a protégé of noted 20th-century environmentalist and Sierra Club Director David Brower, who hand-picked Werbach to run for the club's presidency. Upon his election, Rolling Stone labeled him "a fixture on lists of the most influential Americans under 30."

While leading the Sierra Club, Werbach negotiated a behind-the-scenes agreement with the Clinton Administration to create the 1,900,000-acre (7,700 km^{2}) Grand Staircase of the Escalante National Monument.

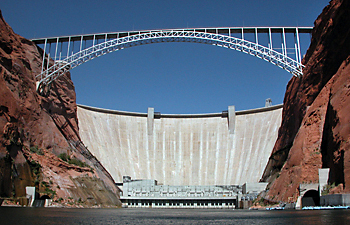
Glen Canyon Dam

During his first year in office, he toured the country giving more than 200 speeches. By the end of his second term, the average age of a Sierra Club member had dropped from 47 to 37.

In 1997, while president of the Sierra Club, Werbach worked with David Brower to begin a campaign to drain Lake Powell. Lake Powell is an artificial lake created by Glen Canyon Dam, and the second largest water reservoir in the U.S.

Glen Canyon Dam is the second-largest dam in the United States. At 710 feet tall, it contains 4,910,000 cubic yards of concrete. The dam is also considered unstable having nearly failed in 1983 as the result of a flood on the upper Colorado River that led to extended use of its tunnel spillways.

The campaign received considerable public attention, and become the focus of congressional hearings, but was ultimately unsuccessful.

In 1997, he published his first book, Act Now, Apologize Later, a series of essays and autobiographical anecdotes recounting the many average citizens he'd met while touring the country: "From rural priests to animal trackers, from a 12-year-old girl in California to three elderly women in Georgia, from senators to surfers and from Woody Harrelson to llama riders, an incredible array of people give us a thousand reasons to be hopeful."

=== After Sierra Club ===
After leaving The Sierra Club, Werbach founded Act Now Productions to experiment with storytelling and emerging web technology, producing and hosting two seasons of the cable newsmagazine show Thin Green Line. The show featured Julia Butterfly Hill as a correspondent, with Werbach climbing Luna, the giant redwood tree she was occupying, to film her regular reports. Act Now Productions also worked with artists including the Beastie Boys, Pearl Jam and Alanis Morissette, developing tools for causes.

Additionally, Act Now developed sustainability-oriented technology projects including carbon audits, climate program management, and online marketing campaigns for Fortune 500 companies. The company also created the Personal Sustainability Plan (PSP) employee engagement program for Wal-Mart, training 1.5 million employees.

Werbach was appointed in 2003 by San Francisco city supervisor Chris Daly to the San Francisco Public Utilities Commission while then-Mayor Willie Brown was out of town, leading to a city constitutional crisis as the mayor attempted to have him removed. He prevailed, and led efforts at the commission to protect the Yosemite Valley watershed.

Werbach later co-founded the Apollo Alliance, which developed the model for President Obama's $150 billion clean energy investment program.

On December 8, 2004, in a speech before the Commonwealth Club of California called "The Death of Environmentalism and the Birth of the Commons Movement", Werbach announced that the environmental movement was dead and stated "I am done calling myself an environmentalist." The speech suggested that advances in environmentalism had stalled, due to outdated thinking and approaches.

Between 2004 and 2008 Werbach was a director on the 6-member board of Greenpeace International, where he supported the Greenpeace agreement with major soybean producers in the Amazon to halt all purchases of soybeans from newly deforested land.

Between 1998 and 2009, Werbach Directed "This Is Noise Pop," a music documentary that was filmed "onstage and backstage," and covered the rise of American indie music stars like Modest Mouse, Pavement, and more. In 2011, Rolling Stone Magazine named it one of the "Seven Best New Music Documentaries" of the year. “It’s about the idea of indie and what happens when it goes mainstream—is it still indie?" Werbach said for Rolling Stone Magazine.

=== Saatchi & Saatchi ===
In January 2008, Werbach sold Act Now Productions to global advertising agency Saatchi&Saatchi, eventually joining the board and being promoted to Chief Sustainability Officer, where he helped launch sustainable products for brands like Procter & Gamble, Vestas wind turbines, and Toyota. In 2009, Werbach published his second book, Strategy for Sustainability: A Business Manifesto (Harvard Business Press). The book was well-received, and continues to be taught in business schools.

In 2010, Werbach was inducted into the Advertising Hall of Achievement by the American Advertising Federation for his work on sustainable marketing, which he described as being "like Sarah Palin getting an award from the American Grammatical Society."

In 2011 Werbach was chosen as a "Young Global Leader" by the Forum for Young Global Leaders at the World Economic Forum.

In 2013 Werbach Keynoted the iconic SXSW conference's "eco" program with a speech titled "Have Americans reached peak stuff?"

=== Trove ===
In 2011, Werbach co-founded Yerdle along with Andy Ruben and Carl Tashian. Yerdle was a peer-to-peer marketplace that helped people and companies re-use their physical items, eventually growing the marketplace to more than one million members, while partner with sustainable retail pioneers like Patagonia. Yerdle eventually changed its name to Trove and pivoted its business model to support brands including Lululemon, Allbirds, Nordstrom's and Levi's to create their own re-use programs. In August 2021 Trove raised $77.5 million and was valued between $200-300 million.

In 2013, Werbach was arrested in front of the White House with Daryl Hannah, Bill McKibben, and Julian Bond to raise the profile of climate change by protesting the completion of the Keystone XL pipeline.

=== Win the Future ===
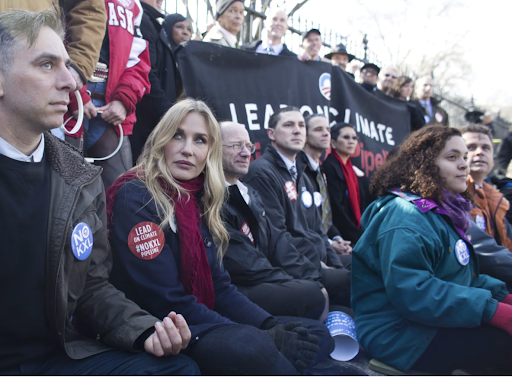
Werbach arrested in front of the White House

In 2016, following the election of Donald Trump to the U.S. presidency, Werbach co-founded Win the Future with Reid Hoffman and Mark Pincus as a "non partisan project lab exploring and developing techniques to give more voice and choice to the American voter."

In 2018, the group announced a collaboration with political comedian Samantha Bee to develop a non-partisan voter turnout game called This is Not a Game: The Game.

Werbach worked closely with Bee to develop and launch the game in advance of the 2018 U.S. midterm elections. According to Bee, the goal was "to make something that would drive voter turnout in a bipartisan way. And I think that we have done that because somehow we have captured the voice of the show, but made it so that we're making fun of everyone — in an appropriate manner."

According to Wired magazine, "the [game's] quiz questions and answers are intended to offer insight into the often granular and murky decisions that end up on midterm ballots—so that people will be more likely to want to vote on them." The game was downloaded over a million times and launched in the top five games on the Apple App Store. Werbach and Bee collaborated again in 2018 to launch the “Totally Unrigged Primary Game”.

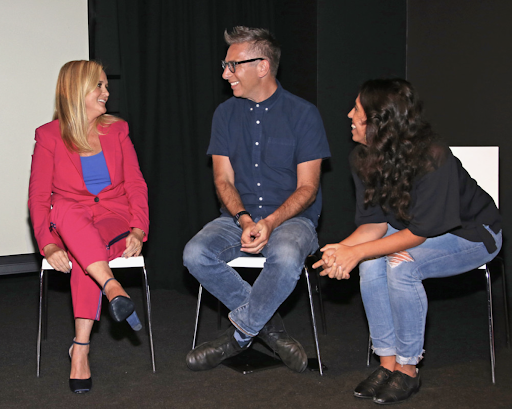
Samantha Bee, Adam Werbach, Razan Ghalayini

=== Amazon ===
In 2020 Werbach was recruited by Amazon to become their first Global Lead for Sustainable Shopping.

Werbach's role at Amazon was to transform customer sentiment for sustainable products and services into a demand signal to encourage improvements in materials innovation, manufacturing practices, and resource use. While at Amazon, Werbach helped launch Climate Pledge Friendly, which recognizes over 500,000 sustainably certified products and more than 50 eco-certifications. He also helped launch Amazon Aware, a multi-category private brand consisting of sustainably-certified products as well as a proprietary Amazon eco-certification called Compact by Design, which rewards product manufacturers for efficient packaging design.

=== Kapital Entertainment ===
On April 4, 2023, Kapital Entertainment announced that social entrepreneur Adam Werbach had joined Aaron Kaplan's Kapital Entertainment in the newly created position of Head Of Digital. With his hire, the indie studio is launching Kapital Digital, a new division focused on digital content.

Kapital plans to work with writer, director, actor and producer partners to create experiences and extend storytelling beyond traditional scripted and unscripted/documentary television and film.

“There are so many opportunities to reach an audience, and all of us at Kapital are excited to work with Adam to find unique ways to tell stories and share experiences outside of our core scripted business,” Kaplan said.

“When Aaron and I started talking, we recognized that although we pursued completely different careers, we share a passion for expanding the boundaries of storytelling and embracing new ways to engage audiences, Werbach said. “Working at startups, or at Amazon, or the Sierra Club, I’ve been fascinated by how new technologies like AI and machine learning can bring people closer and stimulate new interactions."

== Personal life ==
Werbach lives in San Francisco with his wife Lyn and their three children.
