= Collaborative for High Performance Schools =

US green building rating program

The Collaborative for High Performance Schools (CHPS) is the first green building rating program designed for K-12 schools in the United States' It provides information and resources to schools in order to facilitate the construction and operation of high performance institutions. A high performance school is energy and resource efficient as well as healthy, comfortable, well lit, and containing the amenities for a quality education.

== History and organization ==
CHPS was created as the result of a meeting in November 1999, when the California Energy Commission called together Pacific Gas and Electric Company, Sempra Energy, and Southern California Edison to discuss how to improve the energy performance of California’s schools. CHPS addresses not only energy efficiency, but additional considerations that foster healthy and environmentally responsible school buildings. The CHPS criteria, published in 2002, established the nation’s first building rating program specifically intended to assist schools in designing sound, environmentally responsible learning spaces.

Now, CHPS is a national membership organization with two high performance building rating and recognition programs: CHPS Designed and CHPS Verified. Schools can self-certify their building through the CHPS Designed program, or seek third-party verification of their high performance school through the CHPS Verified program. Both programs utilize the CHPS guidelines provided in the Best Practices Manual, a six volume technical manual detailing the process of building and maintaining a high performance school. In addition, CHPS offers training, conferences, and other tools for designing healthy, green schools. The CHPS Low-Emitting Materials table contains products that have been certified to meet the CHPS Low-Emitting Materials criteria, Section 01350, for use in a typical classroom as described in a California Department of Health Services (CDHS) Standard Practice. The CHPS Low-Emitting Materials table is referenced in the California Green Building Code and in the Minnesota Sustainable Building Guidelines.

CHPS membership is composed of over 225 member organizations including government agencies, utility companies, school districts, non-profit organizations and private companies. While the program started in California, it has now expanded to other states, including New York, Washington, Maryland, Rhode Island, New Hampshire, Maine, and Connecticut. Soon, Texas and Colorado will also adopt CHPS standards. CHPS School Districts include Los Angeles Unified School District, Burbank Unified School District, Coast Community College District, Dry Creek Joint Elementary School District, San Diego Unified School District, San Francisco Unified School District, San Marcos Unified School District, San Rafael City Schools, Visalia Unified School District, Natomas Unified School District, New Haven Unified School District, Ukiah Unified School District, Cajon Valley Union School District, Poway Unified School District, Palo Alto Unified School District, Oakland Unified School District, Roseland School District, Menlo Park City School District, Santa Ana Unified School District, West Contra Costa Unified School District, Santa Monica Malibu Unified School District, Long Beach Unified School District, Capistrano Unified School District, and Windsor Unified School District. The CHPS Board of Directors and Technical Committee consist of national representatives from a range of sectors involved in school design, construction and operation.

== High performance schools ==
High performance schools are healthy, comfortable, energy efficient, resource efficient, water efficient, safe, secure, adaptable, and easy to operate and maintain. These qualities help school districts assist students to achieve higher test scores, retain quality teachers and staff, reduce operating cost, increase average daily attendance, and reduce liability, while at the same time being friendly to the environment. High performance design can have a positive effect on health and comfort, and design strategies such as daylighting have been shown to enhance student learning. Good indoor air quality is essential for teacher and student health. Good design also produces more comfortable environments with proper lighting, air temperature, humidity, and noise levels. These factors reduce distractions and create environments where students and teachers can see clearly, hear accurately, and not feel too warm or too cold.

High performance design is also cost effective because it creates environments that are energy and resource efficient. These increased efficiencies save money on utility bills and are so valuable that some organizations will provide building owners with funds to have them included in the design. Furthermore, healthier environments can bring money into the school by lowering absenteeism and increasing funding based on average daily attendance. These financial, health, and productivity benefits are the result of integrated design: understanding how building elements affect one another to optimize the performance of the entire school.

On June 4, 2008, the U.S. House of Representatives passed the "21st Century Green High-Performing Public School Facilities Act," that commits over $20 billion of funding over the next five years to high performance schools. CHPS is recognized as one of the standards that projects would need to meet in order to qualify for the H.R. 3021 legislation funding. H.R. 3021 was referred to the Senate on August 1, 2008.

== CHPS Best Practices Manual ==
The CHPS Best Practices Manual is a six-volume technical guide for high performance schools. The manual covers planning, design, high performance benchmarks, maintenance and operations, commissioning and relocatable classrooms in high performance schools. There are versions of the Criteria Volume available for all participating states. There are versions of the Planning Volume available for California and Massachusetts. The manual was developed through a consensus process with the assistance of school officials, state agencies, industry representatives and design professionals. CHPS periodically updates each volume of the manual.

== See also ==
- Education in the United States
- Environment of the United States
- Environmental groups and resources serving K–12 schools
