= Ruckus Society =

American nonprofit organization

The Ruckus Society
- Company type: Nonprofit
- Industry: Activism
- Founded: 1995, Mount Hood National Forest, Oregon
- Headquarters: Oakland, California
- Key people: Mike Roselle (co-founder), Twilly Cannon (co-founder), John Sellers, Adrienne Maree Brown, Megan Swoboda, Sharon Lungo, Diana Pei Wu
- Products: Strategic nonviolent direct action, Internet activism, civil disobedience
- Revenue: $250,000
- Total assets: 2,149,893 United States dollar (2022)
- Number of employees: 3
- Website: ruckus.org

The Ruckus Society is a nonprofit organization that sponsors skill-sharing and nonviolent direct action training, strategy & consultation for activists and organizers from frontline and impacted communities working on social justice, human rights, migrant rights, workers' rights and environmental justice. It was founded by Mike Roselle and Twilly Cannon.

== Background ==
In an interview with John Sellers, former executive director and current president of The Ruckus Society, stated that Roselle and Cannon founded The Ruckus Society in the mid-1990s based on the "direct-action model" they learned from Greenpeace.

The name of the organization, explains Sellers, is not an acronym but refers to the term "ruckus", meaning "a loud, angry interruption, a hullabaloo, a disruption."

The Ruckus Society's mission is to provide training in classic nonviolent direct action and civil disobedience tactics in the context of community-driven campaigns, including creative resistance, urban rappelling, media & communications, and blockades with and without gear.

The organization consists of a small core group of staff members, and a larger team of volunteers in close contact with the leadership. In 2002, the organization had a staff of four full-time employees, roughly thirty volunteers, over 120 people acting as trainers, and over 2,000 graduates of their training opportunities. Volunteers designs custom trainings and camps based on the specific needs and campaigns of the activists, and use popular education techniques to allow participants to discover the direct action knowledge they already possess. According to leadership, The Ruckus Society provides, "non-violence training, media training, direct action planning and strategy, and scouting."

== Services and collaborations ==
The Ruckus Society has co-sponsored projects including the Not Your Soldier Project (NYS), a counter-recruitment effort with the War Resisters League, and the Indigenous Peoples' Power Project (IP3), bringing together indigenous youth organizers from all over the country.

In 2006, Ruckus teamed up with Working Assets for an Election Protection project. Together with Global Exchange and Rainforest Action Network, they worked against Ford Motor Company and later other auto-manufacturers.

The Ruckus Society is a member of numerous coalitions efforts, and has performed actions for Wal-Mart Watch and others. The group has provided training to Greenpeace, Patagonia, Inc., the California Faculty Association, United Students Against Sweatshops, Students for Bhopal, Student/Farmworker Alliance, the Silicon Valley Toxics Coalition, Students for a Free Tibet and Detroit Summer.

The Ruckus Society helped bottomline organizing for the US Social Forum in Detroit in 2010 and hosted a Migrant Rights Action Camp with NDLON at the Highlander Center in 2011.

== Leadership ==
John Sellers was the executive director of the organization for 8 years, through the World Trade Organization protests in Seattle in 1999, the creation of IP3 and NYS and his own $2 million bail. Adrienne Maree Brown came on as executive director in 2006, the first woman of color to lead the organization.

The organization created a co-directorship model in 2010 and in 2013 hired a third co-director. Leadership in the organization comes from the network of trainers and the many movements from which they come.

== Impact ==
The Ruckus Society is made up of three staff and a network of over 150 action trainers and strategists located primarily in the United States but also distributed throughout the world.

As a movement support organization, The Ruckus Society has trained thousands of organizers and activists throughout the years in non-violent direct action and creative resistance, including those in environmental justice, migrant rights, education justice, forest defense, indigenous rights, workers rights, youth and criminal justice, and eviction defense.

== Funding ==
According to research conducted by social movement scholar Edouard Morena, "over 95 per cent of the Ruckus Society's revenues come from 'direct public support'" and private grants, not governmental grants. This type of funding includes donations for individuals, foundations, and other organizations. In 2000, the organization had a budget of $370,000. Major funders of The Ruckus Society have included the Turner Foundation, the Ben and Jerry's Foundation, and the Ecology Center Inc.

== Criticism ==
In its early years, The Ruckus Society was criticized for being composed of largely privileged white activists, which has been acknowledged. This led the leadership to attempt to diversify its causes and leadership. Since the mid-2000s The Ruckus Society has collaborated with numerous groups representing Indigenous environmental concerns, migrant rights, and Detroit-based environmental groups.

The organization has also been critiqued for its lack of transparency around funding sources. This has prompted attempts to investigate the sources of their funding.

The Ruckus Society has been the target of conservative outlets who describe the group as violent anarchists, and as being responsible for training criminal activists who participate in vandalism and destruction of private property.
