= Mike Roselle =

American environmental activist and author (born 1954)

Mike Roselle (born 1954) is an American environmental activist and author who is a prominent member of the radical environmentalism movement. Roselle is one of the co-founders of the radical environmental organization Earth First!, as well as of Rainforest Action Network, the Ruckus Society, and Climate Ground Zero.

== Early life ==
Roselle grew up in Louisville, Kentucky and moved to Los Angeles, California as a child in 1968. During his youth and after his relocation to California, Roselle became more interested in politics.

== Career ==
Earth First! was founded in 1980 by Mike Roselle, Dave Foreman, Howie Wolke, Bart Koehler, and Ron Kezar. Rainforest Action Network was founded in San Francisco in 1985 by Roselle and Randy Hayes. Roselle states that he has been arrested about 50 times in his career; he says that "it's hard to remember them all anymore." He participated the Washington A16, 2000 protest, alongside environmental activist Julia Butterfly Hill and United Steelworkers of America president George Becker.

Roselle is the co-author of his biography, Tree Spiker: From Earth First! to Lowbagging: My Struggles in Radical Environmental Action (2009).
