= Rebecca Tarbotton =

Canadian environmental, human rights and food activist

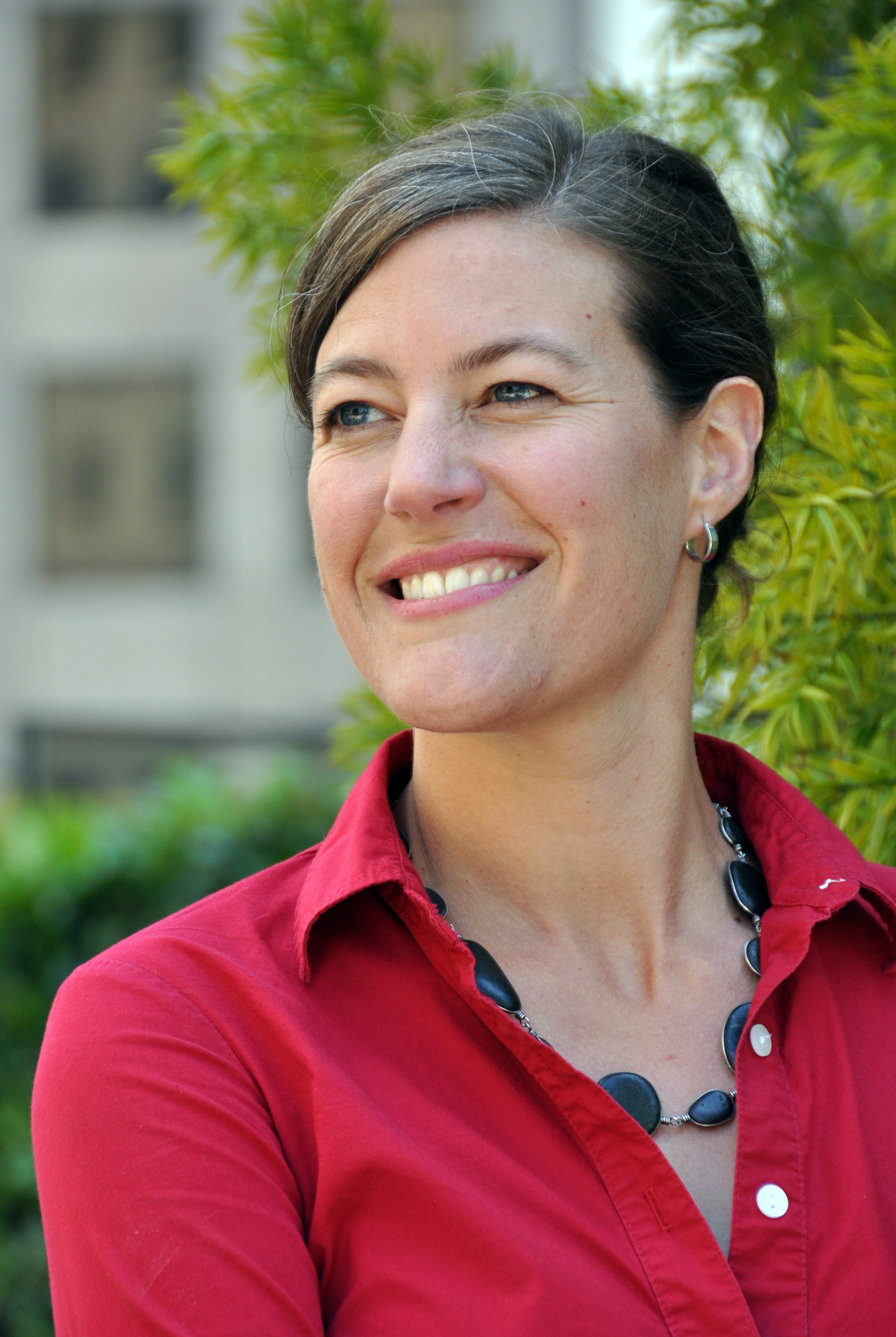
- Born: Rebecca Tarbotton; 30 July 1973; Vancouver, British Columbia, Canada
- Died: 26 December 2012 (aged 39); Puerto Vallarta, Mexico
- Education: McGill University; University of British Columbia
- Occupation: Environmental activist

Rebecca Tarbotton (30 July 1973 – 26 December 2012) was a Canadian environmental, human rights, and food activist, and the Executive Director of Rainforest Action Network.

== Career and activism ==
Tarbotton began her environmental career doing research on indigenous communities on Baffin Island, in the far northern Canadian territory of Nunavut. Subsequently, Tarbotton spent eight years working under Helena Norberg-Hodge at the International Society for Ecology and Culture (ISEC). Tarbotton ran ISEC's programs in Ladakh, India, for several years, and later worked in their UK and US offices promoting local alternatives to economic globalization. She referred to her years at ISEC as the period "where the roots of my activism are."

Tarbotton led Rainforest Action Network as Executive Director beginning 3 August 2010, the first woman to hold the position in RAN's 27-year history. Before becoming Executive Director, Tarbotton led RAN's Global Finance Campaign, campaigning against some of the nation's most powerful private financial institutions to successfully negotiate for the creation of a sector-wide bank policy statement known as the Carbon Principles.

Tarbotton was a regular panelist at international and human rights conferences, has been featured in major international media outlets, and published numerous articles on her areas of expertise. She was a regular contributor to The Huffington Post and other major media outlets, and has been a fellow at the Oakland Institute, a BankTrack committee member, as well as an alumna of the Rockwood Leadership Institute and winner of the UK-based Derek Cooper Award for Investigative/Campaigning Journalism.

She died from drowning while swimming during a vacation to Mexico in 2012.

== Education ==
A native of British Columbia, Tarbotton earned a bachelor's degree in Geography from McGill University and a master's degree in Community and Regional Planning from the University of British Columbia.
