= Rock Creek, Boone County, West Virginia =

Place in West Virginia, United States

Rock Creek, West Virginia
- Unincorporated community
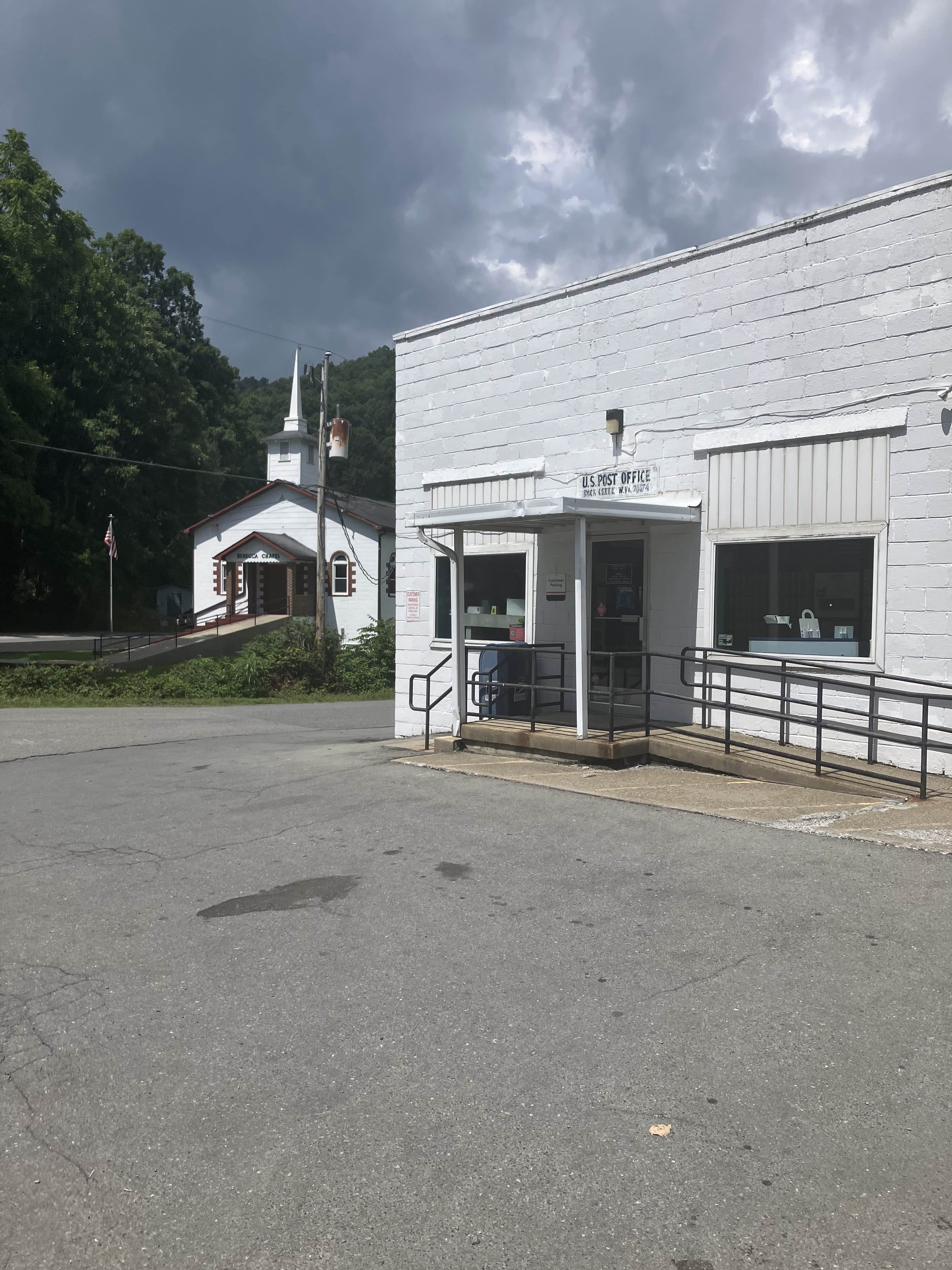
- Post office in Rock Creek, West Virginia

- Location within West Virginia and the United States Rock Creek, West Virginia (the United States)
- Coordinates: 38°06′11″N 81°50′45″W
- Country: United States
- State: West Virginia
- County: Boone
- Elevation: 686 ft (209 m)
- Time zone: UTC-5 (Eastern (EST))
  - Summer (DST): UTC-4 (EDT)
- Area codes: 304 & 681
- GNIS feature ID: 1549900

Rock Creek is an unincorporated community in Boone County, West Virginia, United States. Rock Creek is located on U.S. Route 119, 3.5 miles (5.6 km) north-northwest of Madison.
