= Sierra Student Coalition =

Grassroots environmental organisation

- Founded: 1991; 35 years ago Washington, D.C., United States
- Type: 501(c)(3)
- Purpose: Environmentalism, Global Warming, Renewable Energy
- Location: Washington, D.C., United States
- Method: Direct action, lobbying, petition, demonstration
- Key people: Karissa Gerhke, National Director Muskan Walia, National Director (current)
- Website: ssc.sierraclub.org

The Sierra Student Coalition (SSC) is the national student chapter of the Sierra Club, a grassroots environmental organization. Founded by Adam Werbach in 1991, it had about 14,000 members and was almost entirely student-led. The SSC was dissolved in 2023. It was reinstated in July of 2025 by Muskan Walia, a youth activist from Utah.

== National-level ==
The SSC is under the leadership of an executive director.

The SSC is governed by a seven-member volunteer Executive Committee (Ex-Com). The Ex-Com sets the national campaign priorities of the SSC and is responsible for allocating the annual budget, prioritizing national campaigns, and serving the volunteer membership and Chapter structure of the SSC. Every ExCom member also serves on a subcommittee, the venues where the rest of the SSC's national activities are organized.

The other major committees:

The Campaign Committee (CampCom). Camp-Com is responsible for planning and developing the SSC's national campaign priorities including development of relevant campaign resources in coordination with SSC staff. The SSC's current priority campaign is "Campuses Beyond Coal." The campaign is designed to be run on college campuses and local communities.

The Trainings Committee (Trainings-Com). Trainings-Com teaches the skills that the SSC's member activists use to organize. In coordination with the SSC Trainings Director, the Trainings-Com is responsible for conducting Summer Environmental Training Programs (SPROG) during the summer. They also run workshops at regional and national conferences and train students who want to become trainers.

The Anti-Oppression Committee (AO Com). AO Com works to establish Anti-Oppression as an integral part of the SSC to encourage diversity, inclusivity, and the open exchange of ideas. In addition, AO Com also creates an open and safe space for the SSC; through the implementation of the AO curriculum in SSC gatherings, including SPROG. AO Com creates and/or adjusts any projects, policies, or initiatives to integrate AO principles within the SSC at both a grassroots and national level. Collaboration and input from all those in SSC get used to accomplishing these goals.

== Chapter-level ==
The major work of the SSC is performed by a nationwide network of Campus and Community Organizers. These organizers are the students who advance the SSC and the student environmental movement.

Campus Organizers organize SSC groups that run local campaigns on their high school or college campus. These local campaigns are usually consistent with SSC priority issue focus at the state and national level.

Community Organizers bring together existing SSC campus groups, group leaders, and/or recruiting non-SSC groups to the SSC that are within close geographic proximity. These groups pursue a local campaign that is usually consistent with the SSC's national focus. A community organizer position only becomes available once there are at least two functioning and registered SSC campus groups within a community to organize and coordinate. Community Organizers often utilize Sierra Club as a recruitment partner.

A Chapter Organizing Team (or State ExCom) is formed when there are multiple campus groups or community campaigns that work together on a statewide campaign. The Chapter Organizing Team is a collection of the Community Organizers throughout a state. The Chapter Organizing Team mentor Campus Organizers and plan state trainings or conferences.

== Priority Campaign: The Campus Climate Challenge ==
The Campus Climate Challenge is a project of more than 30 leading youth organizations throughout the U.S. and Canada which includes the Sierra Student Coalition. The Challenge encourages young people to organize on college campuses and high schools across Canada and the US to promote 100% sustainable energy policies at their schools. The goal of the Challenge is to grow a generation-wide movement to minimize global warming by reducing carbon emissions at their high schools and colleges.

During the summer of 2007 the Sierra Student Coalition worked in partnership with the Sierra Club and the US Steelworks Union in New Hampshire and Iowa to reach out to citizens to call for action to cut carbon emissions 80% by 2050 and to create 2 million new jobs in a sustainable energy economy. With the ReEnergizeUS campaign, the SSC held two major 5-day marches which culminated in rallies at Des Moines and Concord.

== Summer Environmental Leader Training Program (SPROG) ==
SPROG is a week-long youth leadership and grassroots training program. High school and college students learn the essentials of grassroots advocacy, build community, and learn the skills to be a force for change. SPROGs are held in several locations throughout the United States each summer. Six programs take place every summer, and SPROGs are regularly held in the Southwest, Southeast, Northeast/Mid-Atlantic, Northwest regions, and Puerto Rico.

== See also ==
- Education in the United States
- Environment of the United States
- Environmental groups and resources serving K–12 schools
