= Rock Creek, Raleigh County, West Virginia =

Rock Creek, West Virginia
- Unincorporated community
- Location within West Virginia Location within the United States
- Coordinates: 37°51′02″N 81°27′06″W
- Country: United States
- State: West Virginia
- County: Raleigh
- Elevation: 1,325 ft (404 m)
- Time zone: UTC-5 (Eastern (EST))
  - Summer (DST): UTC-4 (EDT)
- Area codes: 304 & 681
- GNIS feature ID: 1545899

Rock Creek is an unincorporated community in Raleigh County, West Virginia, United States. Rock Creek is located on West Virginia Route 3, 15 miles (24 km) west-northwest of Beckley.
