= Rising Tide North America =

Grassroots climate change network

- Formation: 2006
- Type: Environmental movement
- Location: North America
- Region served: Canada, Mexico and the United States
- Methods: Direct action; grassroots organising; popular education
- Website: risingtidenorthamerica.org

Rising Tide North America is a grassroots network of groups and individuals in North America organizing action against the root causes of climate change. Founded in 2006, it is part of the broader Rising Tide network, which originated in The Hague, Netherlands, in 2000. It campaigns against the extraction of more fossil fuels and new fossil fuel infrastructure.

== History ==
Rising Tide was formed by groups and individuals who came together to organize protests and events at the United Nations Climate Conference of Parties (COP6) in The Hague, Netherlands, in November 2000.

In 2000, Rising Tide UK was formed. In mid-2004, Rising Tide Australia formed in Newcastle, Australia, the world's largest coal export port. A smaller group has also started in Sydney.

Rising Tide North America was formed mainly by Earth First!, Mountain Justice and other experienced activists in a desire to be less insular and focus more on coalition building and linking climate change issues to other causes.

Rising Tide describes itself as "a grassroots network of groups and individuals who take direct action to confront the roots [sic] causes of climate change and promote local, community-based solutions to the climate crisis. Employing popular education and direct action to address the root causes of climate change with a focus on climate justice, Rising Tide now spans three continents."

== Organization ==
Rising Tide North America is a network with over 50 chapters, allies and local contacts throughout Canada, Mexico and the United States.

Rising Tide North America has active local groups in Idaho, Utah, Portland, Southern Oregon, Chicago, Texas, the San Francisco Bay Area and Alaska. Rising Tide operates through decentralized network organizing consisting of autonomous local groups and that mostly use consensus decision-making.

== Activities ==
On December 17, 2013, 16 protesters with Portland Rising Tide were arrested after locking themselves to disabled vehicles in front of a tar sands megaload shipment near John Day, Oregon, delaying the shipment’s passage. Police responded by using 'pain compliance' to remove the protest. On December 1, 2013, two men locked themselves to the tar sands megaload truck and had to be removed by police, which took so long the shipment canceled its nightly move.

Rising Tide NYC organized three days of action on climate change in New York City on April 20–22, 2015. They rallied at the office of New York Gov. Andrew Cuomo to call for him to reject a proposed deepwater port which would be used to import natural gas.

In 2015, Siskiyou Rising Tide (formerly Southern Oregon Rising Tide) formed in opposition to the Jordan Cove Energy Project, an $8 billion dollar liquefied natural gas pipeline and export terminal proposed in Southwestern Oregon. It was revealed that Siskiyou Rising Tide and other environmental groups were being surveilled by the FBI, local sheriffs and private security firms funded by the pipeline company Pembina. After years of protest and opposition, the Jordan Cove Energy Project was ultimately cancelled by Pembina in 2021.

== See also ==
- Action on climate change
- Campaign against Climate Change (UK pressure group)
- Conservation ethic
- Earth First!
- Environmental movement
- List of environmental organizations
- Paxus Calta
- Stop Climate Chaos (UK pressure group)
