= Environmental groups and resources serving K–12 schools =

This article includes information about environmental groups and resources (such as those provided by government, its agencies, and existing or proposed legislation) that serve K–12 schools in the United States and internationally. The entries in this article are for broad-scope organizations that serve at least one state (within the US) or similar regions.

== Specific organized groups ==
As of 2008, many environmental groups exist, but they tend to overlap and duplicate efforts. The information here does not currently attempt to reconcile these issues, but instead presents information as provided by each of the organizations described when available.

Listed below are formally organized groups in alphabetical order.

=== Action For Nature ===
Action For Nature is a non-profit program that runs the annual International Young Eco-Hero Awards. The awards recognize young people who are taking action to solve the world’s environmental problems. International youth ages 8 to 16 who have completed a substantial project to aid environmental sustainability apply each year. A panel of judges including experts in environmental science, biology, and education determines the year’s top achievers by age group and awards a prize to the winners.

=== The Collaborative for High Performance Schools ===
The Collaborative for High Performance Schools has a mission to facilitate the design, construction and operation of high-performance schools and build environments that are energy and resource efficient. They also aim to achieve healthy, comfortable and well lit amenities for a quality education.

=== Cool the Earth (CTE) ===
Cool the Earth (CTE) is a program that educates K-8 students and their families about global warming and encourages them to take simple actions to reduce their carbon emissions. The program runs in 100 schools in Northern California. CTE's mission is to educate children and their families about climate change and motivate them to take simple and measurable energy conservation actions that reduce their carbon footprint. CTE has a program training and tracking system on the web, making their program replicable throughout the country.

=== Drizzle Environmental Society ===
Drizzle Environmental Society, established in 2014, provides environmental education initiatives, campaigns, and programs to teenagers and young adults through digital media. The organization is based in Vancouver, Canada. The organization's main initiative is the Youth Environmental Challenge which encourages youth from around the world to complete five eco-friendly actions of any size during a year.

=== Power Shift Network (formerly Energy Action Coalition) ===
Power Shift Network is a project of 48 leading youth and environmental organizations throughout the US and Canada. The Power Shift Network sponsors the Campus Climate Challenge, which leverages the power of young people to organize on college campuses and high schools across Canada and the United States to secure 100% Clean Energy policies at their schools. The Campus Climate Challenge is a growing generation-wide movement to stop global warming, by reducing the pollution from high schools and colleges down to zero and leading society to a clean energy future. The Power Shift Network has run multiple campaigns to achieve these ends. In addition, they planned the first national youth climate change conference, Power Shift '07 at the University of Maryland, College Park and at the U.S. Capitol in Washington, DC.

=== Energy Efficient Schools Initiative (EESI) ===
The Energy Efficient Schools Initiative (EESI)/ was approved by the Tennessee General Assembly in 2008 to provide funding to K-12 schools for energy efficiency projects. The initiative has $90 million available to fund energy efficiency in K-12 schools in Tennessee.

=== EnergySmart Schools Program ===
EnergySmart Schools Program is a United States Department of Energy program through which the department "seeks to catalyze significant improvements in energy efficiency in the nation's K-12 schools at a time of enormous opportunity."

=== Energy Star for K-12 School Districts ===
Energy Star for K-12 School Districts is a United States Environmental Protection Agency program that provides tools and resources for K-12 school districts to implement Energy Star technologies.

=== Free the Planet! ===
Free the Planet! has a stated mission to expand and strengthen the student environmental movement, provide resources for student activists, and work with students to win campaigns for strong environmental protections.

Among activities undertaken by Free the Planet! are the following:

- Expanding the student environmental movement by recruiting students who are concerned about the environment to take action, networking student activists with each other and the larger environmental movement, and providing fresh opportunities and ideas for activists.
- Providing resources for student activists through their Project LEAD Training, Activist Advising program, How To Free The Planet!: Training and Briefings for Environmental Action, action guides, and other materials.
- Working with students to win campaigns for strong environmental protections by providing them with the resources to work on national campaigns together and guides to running effective on-campus campaigns.

On their web site, the last listed accomplishments and newsletters were dated 2004, and no membership numbers are provided online.

=== Green Schools Caucus ===
Green Schools Caucus is a bipartisan United States House of Representatives caucus created to promote green building practices in schools.

=== Green Schools Fellowship ===
Green Schools Fellowship was launched by the US Green Building Council in 2010 and will begin placing full-time sustainability officers in school districts across the country in July 2011. Green Schools Fellowship is an effort to effectively and rapidly transform the environments in which children in the US learn.

=== Green Teacher ===
Green Teacher is a non-profit organization which publishes resources to help educators, both inside and outside of schools, to promote global and environmental awareness among young people from elementary through high school. The organization’s primary activity is the publication of Green Teacher, a quarterly magazine full of teaching ideas from successful “green" educators. Each issue of Green Teacher offers perspectives on the role of education in creating a sustainable future, practical cross-curricular activities for various grade levels, and reviews of the latest teaching resources.

=== Green Youth Alliance ===
Green Youth Alliance is an environmental leadership service organization with the following goals:

- Consciousness Raising: Develop student leaders who can raise awareness about the potentially cataclysmic effects of human-induced climate change
- Action: Create opportunities for students to actively engage in projects that will help reduce our carbon footprint in schools, homes, and communities.
- Political Engagement: Encourage students to participate in the political process of monitoring and interacting with our political representatives to ensure that environmentally friendly political policies are adopted.
- Leadership: Nurture the next generation of environmental leaders by encouraging students to develop their leadership abilities.

=== Kids F.A.C.E. ===
Also known as Kids for A Clean Environment, Kids F.A.C.E. has a stated mission to provide information on environmental issues to children, to encourage and facilitate youth's involvement with effective environmental action, and to recognize those efforts which result in the improvement of nature. As of January 2008, they claim to have more than 2,000 club chapters in fifteen countries and more than 300,000 individual members.

=== International Climate Champs ===
International Climate Champs, is based on a successful UK program run by the Department for Environment, Food and Rural Affairs (DEFRA) in 2006. This project gives youth a voice, increases positive media coverage and helps individuals, schools, communities and many others tackle climate change. These champions are young people of school age, selected to help spread the word about climate change and to get others involved. They are working with in-country partners, initially the G8+5 (Brazil, Canada, China, France, Germany, India, Italy, Japan, Mexico, Russia, South Africa, UK, USA) (as of 2008), to help set up Climate Champion initiatives. Other countries will follow on later. Each country involved selects three people to be International Climate Champions. The Champions are aged 16–18 years.

=== LEED for Schools ===
LEED for Schools is provided by the US Green Building Council. The LEED for Schools Rating System recognizes the unique nature of the design and construction of K-12 schools. Based on the LEED for New Construction rating system, it addresses issues such as classroom acoustics, master planning, mold prevention and environmental site assessment.

=== Lexus Eco Challenge ===
Lexus Eco Challenge was developed to educate students about the environment and inspire them to create a better world. In conjunction with Scholastic Corporation, Lexus designed this national competition to challenge middle and high school students to create and implement environmental programs in their communities.

=== National Association of Independent Schools (NAIS) Sustainable Schools listserve ===
The National Association of Independent Schools (NAIS) (NAIS) Sustainable Schools listserve is available to give all practitioners of matters related to sustainability a forum to pose questions and solicit input and feedback from others working on these issues in independent schools.

=== National Clearinghouse for Educational Facilities ===
The National Clearinghouse for Educational Facilities provides information on planning, designing, funding, building, improving, and maintaining safe, healthy, high performance schools. It is funded by the U.S. Department of Education.

=== Natural Resource Defense Council (NRDC) Green Squad ===
The Natural Resources Defense Council Green Squad teaches kids about the relationship between their schools and environmental and health issues. The site is designed primarily for students in fifth through eighth grade, but also offers information for younger and older students as well as parents and teachers. The Green Squad was made possible through the support of Citigroup Foundation and The F.A.O. Schwarz Family Foundation. The Natural Resources Defense Council is a national environmental group with more than 500,000 members, and the Healthy Schools Network, an organization that works to protect children's environmental health in schools.

=== No Impact Man ===
The No Impact Man web site has a curriculum to help middle and high school students explore the effects their everyday behavior has on the environment, their health, and their well-being. It also challenges students to think about how the systems in our present society influence our lifestyle choices in ways that often are not good for environment. Finally, it guides students to take action both individually and with others to bring about positive change.

=== Project BudBurst ===
Project BudBurst is a national field campaign for citizen scientists designed to engage the public in the collection of important climate change data based on the timing of leafing and flowering of trees and flowers, and the project provides resources and opportunities for K-12 teachers and students. BudBurst participants take careful observations of the phenological events such as the first bud burst, first leafing, first flower, and seed or fruit dispersal of a diversity of tree and flower species, including weeds and ornamentals. The citizen science observations and records are reported into the BudBurst data base. Thousands of citizen scientists participated in the inaugural pilot test of Project BudBurst in 2007 and as a result useful data was collected in a consistent way across the country. Scientists can use this data to learn about the responses of individual plant species to climatic variation locally, regionally, and nationally, and to detect longer-term impacts of climate change by comparing them historical data. The enthusiastic response and robust participation in the 2007 pilot effort made it clear that there was sufficient interest from the American public to expand Project BudBurst in 2008! Project BudBurst was moved from UCAR to NEON in 2011.

=== Second Nature ===
Second Nature focuses on colleges and universities, but partners and support groups that work with K-12 schools in various ways.

=== Sustainable Schools Project ===
Sustainable Schools Project includes many resources on their website including for curriculum such as those titled Big Ideas, Standards, and Reflections.

=== Teens Turning Green ===
Teens Turning Green, or TTG, is a student-led movement devoted to education and advocacy around environmentally sustainable and socially responsible choices for individuals, schools, and communities. Just kicked off in 2012: Kids Turning Green – Start a Chapter.

=== Teens Turning Green Schools ===
Teens Turning Green Schools provides a tool kit and case studies.

=== US Partnership for Education for Sustainable Development ===
The US Partnership for Education for Sustainable Development consists of individuals, organizations, and institutions in the United States dedicated to education for sustainable development(ESD). The K-12 and Teacher Education Sector Team of the US Partnership includes experienced educators who help guide the development of a national ESD network of formal K-12 educators who are engaged in sustainability-related education, and who share the goal of preparing students to be informed participants in the development of sustainable communities. The intent of the K-12 and Teacher Education Sector is to focus on promoting ESD and its network as a whole, not to provide ESD services directly. The website has teaching resources.

=== Zero Footprint Foundation ===
The Zero Footprint Foundation challenge encourages students across the world to take climate change into their own hands by competing to reduce their school’s environmental impact.

== Groups with a focus on specific areas of interest ==
- Farm to School organizations exist at national, state, and local levels, and, in general, they help to develop and implement program through which schools buy and feature locally produced, farm fresh foods such as fruits and vegetables, eggs, honey, meat, and beans on their menus.
- Green fundraising programs, such as Trees for a Change, allow school groups to raise funds while helping the planet. These programs teach students about wildfire, forest restoration, team building and responsibility.
