= Rainforest Action Network =

Environmental organization

- Abbreviation: RAN
- Formation: 1985
- Founder: Mike Roselle, Randy Hayes
- Type: NGO
- Purpose: Environmental protection
- Headquarters: San Francisco, California
- Executive Director: Ginger Cassady
- Website: ran.org

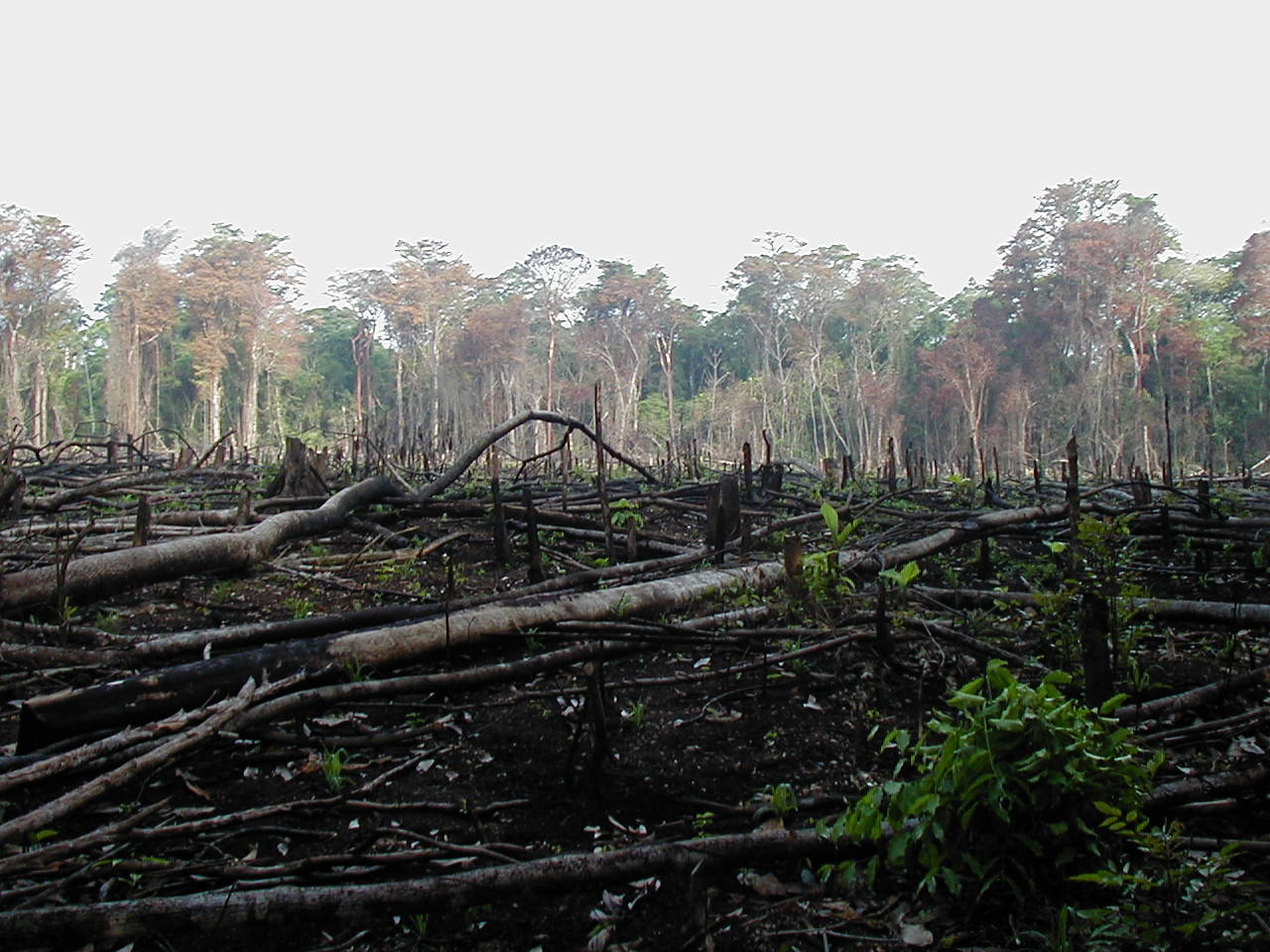
Jungle burned to clear land for agriculture in southern Mexico

Rainforest Action Network (RAN) is an environmental organization based in San Francisco, California, United States. The organization was founded by Randy "Hurricane" Hayes and Mike Roselle in 1985, and first gained national prominence with a grassroots organizing campaign that in 1987 succeeded in convincing Burger King to cancel $31 million worth of destructive Central American rainforest beef contracts. Protecting forests and challenging corporate power has remained a key focus of RAN's campaigns since, and has led RAN into campaigns that have led to transformative policy changes across home building, wood purchasing and supplying, automobile, fashion, paper and banking industries.

== History ==
Rainforest Action Network was founded in San Francisco, California in 1985 by Mike Roselle and Randy "Hurricane" Hayes. Early on, RAN worked with Herbert Chao Gunther, the founder of the Public Media Center in San Francisco, a marketing firm exclusively on social justice and environmental issues. This partnership with Gunther included new branding and campaigns against large multinational corporations in the 1990s, using grassroots activism and savvy media work. They gained national prominence with a grassroots organizing campaign that in 1987 succeeded in convincing Burger King to cancel $31 million worth of destructive Central American rainforest beef contracts.

In 1989, RAN called for a boycott of products and services from Mitsubishi and companies owned by Mitsubishi—including Kirin beer and Nikon cameras—because at the time, Mitsubishi was involved in rainforest destruction through its forestry activities; in 1996, Mitsubishi Motors America and Mitsubishi Electric America facilitated negotiations between RAN activists and Mitsubishi executives which resulted in an end to this boycott in 1998.

Along with Global Exchange and the Ruckus Society, RAN played a central role in organizing the 1999 mass actions against the WTO (World Trade Organization) summit in Seattle. Although the organization once had RAGS (Rainforest Action Groups) around the country, today its operations are centralized in San Francisco.

RAN's executive director, Rebecca Tarbotton, drowned on December 26, 2012, at age 39, while swimming in the Pacific Ocean. Lindsey Allen was subsequently named executive director on August 21, 2013. Allen departed RAN in 2019 and on February 10, 2020, the board elected Ginger Cassady as the new executive director.

== About ==
=== Organizational mission ===
Rainforest Action Network preserves forests, protects the climate and upholds human rights by challenging corporate power and systemic injustice through frontline partnerships and strategic campaigns.

=== Activities and structure ===
RAN drives change through grassroots organizing, media stunts, the use of non-violent civil disobedience, and inside-the-boardroom negotiations to confront and positively influence industry-leading corporations to publicly adopt environmental policies that address issues ranging from deforestation to climate change. Their corporate campaigning strategies have prompted a number of academic case studies reflecting on the relationship between activists and businesses. RAN works in close alliance with an increasingly well coordinated movement of NGOs (non-governmental organizations).

The organization's board of directors includes André Carothers; Anna Hawken McKay; Allan Badiner, Anna Lappé of the Small Planet Institute; and James Gollin, board president and a founding member of the Social Venture Network. Honorary members of RAN's board include Ali MacGraw, Bob Weir, Bonnie Raitt, Chris Noth, John Densmore and Woody Harrelson.

== Programs ==
=== Tropical Forests Program ===
RAN's Tropical Forests Program focuses on stopping rainforest deforestation and degradation and the oppression of forest peoples in Indonesia. As a result of deforestation and the destruction of peatland for the agribusiness and pulp and paper industries, Indonesia is now the third largest emitter of greenhouse gas emissions in the world.

==== Rainforest Agribusiness: palm oil ====
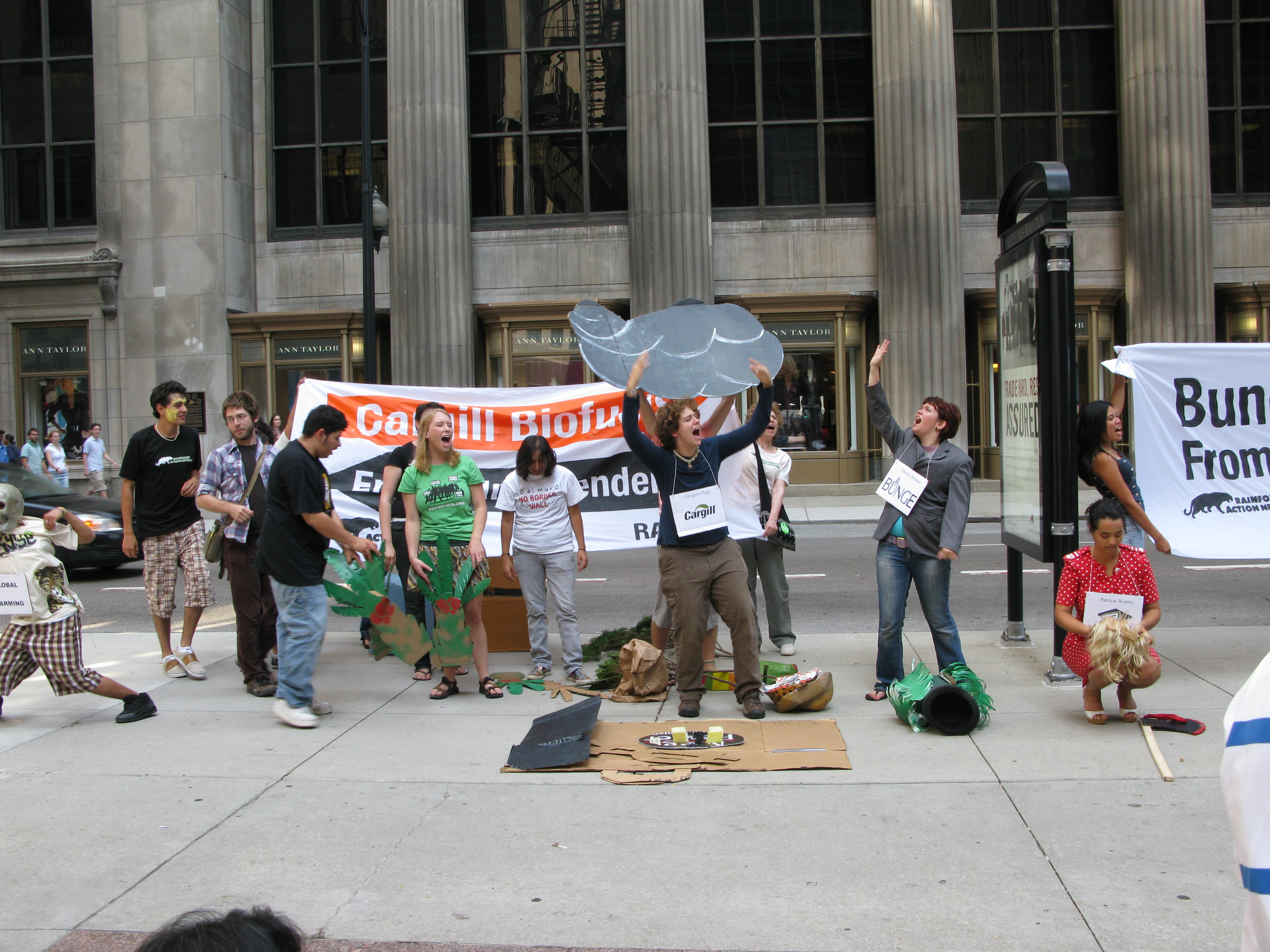
Rainforest Action Network activists, near Chicago Board of Trade, protest against the expansion of palm oil and soy plantations into critical ecosystems. September 22, 2008.

RAN's Rainforest Agribusiness campaign, The Problem With Palm Oil, centers around the social and environmental impact of palm oil plantations in the rainforests of Indonesia and Malaysia. Palm oil plantations in these areas result in the clearcutting of tropical hardwoods, the killing of local wildlife, the displacement of local communities and a significant increase in greenhouse gas emissions. The campaign's main target has been Cargill, a privately owned agribusiness company and the largest supplier of palm oil to the United States. While still applying pressure to Cargill, in 2010 RAN began campaigning for responsible use of palm oil by food production giant General Mills through direct action tactics, negotiation and membership engagement; eight months later General Mills issued a strong palm oil policy and committed to getting all of its palm oil from responsible sources by 2015. The campaign simultaneously collaborated with teenagers Madison Vorva and Rhiannon Tomtishen to help them in their campaign to make Girl Scout Cookies palm-oil free. The two young women were awarded the prestigious Brower Youth Award for their work.

=== Energy and Finance program ===
The Energy and Finance campaign targets financial institutions involved in the financing of destructive forestry and fossil fuels projects. Historically, the campaign has succeeded in obtaining strong environmental policies from banks such as Citi, Bank of America, JP Morgan Chase, and others. Currently, the campaign focuses on discouraging banks' financing of coal projects, and especially mountaintop removal mining (MTR), principally within the United States. This form of surface mining uses millions of tons of explosives to blow apart mountain peaks in order to access the coal seam below. According to Rainforest Action Network, eight of nine banks that previously funded MTR have now established policies and criteria to restrict their funding of this devastating form of coal mining. Beginning in the Fall of 2011, the Energy and Finance Program has been campaigning to move Bank of America, whom they name as the leading US financier of the coal industry, to divest from their coal investments and invest in renewable energy sources.

=== We Can Change Chevron: toxic waste oil ===
Launched in December 2009, the We Can Change Chevron campaign targets the California-based oil corporation for their subsidiary Texaco's dumping of 18 billion US gallons (68,000,000 m^{3}) of waste oil into the Amazon rainforest in Ecuador. We Can Change Chevron aims to pressure Chevron into paying for the cleanup of the waste oil pits abandoned by their subsidiary, and to develop an environmental and human rights policy that will prevent future scenarios like this from occurring in the future. Chevron acquired Texaco in 2001, and asserts that Texaco completed its agreement to clean up its share of the waste generated by the joint venture between Texaco and Petroecuador, the state run oil company. The company claims it cleaned up one third of the waste, more than its share of the agreement with Petroecuador, and the rest of the responsibility lies with the state who has had sole ownership of the oil fields since 1992. The case resulted in a historic ruling against the oil giant, who was ordered to pay $18 billion in damages to the plaintiffs. After an appeal by Chevron, the judgement was upheld by an Ecuadorian court in January 2012.

== Controversies ==
In 2003, the RAN organization was subpoenaed by the U.S. House Committee on Ways and Means to hand over every document and piece of footage relating to all protests the organization participated in since 1993, in order to investigate whether they should be entitled to the tax-exempt status. The organization's then-Executive Director Michael Brune labeled this investigation "the latest attempt to intimidate RAN's supporters, and a part of a larger and more disturbing effort by corporate interests to stifle dissent and control free speech."

The organization has come under fire from environmentalists opposed to the Forest Stewardship Council (FSC) for its membership in that group, though RAN maintains that their engagement is necessary to push for stronger protection of forests and the rights of forest communities by the FSC.

== See also ==
- Amazon rainforest
- Conservation movement
- Environmental movement in the United States
- Glenn Switkes
