= Environmental justice and coal mining in Appalachia =

Environmental protection and equity

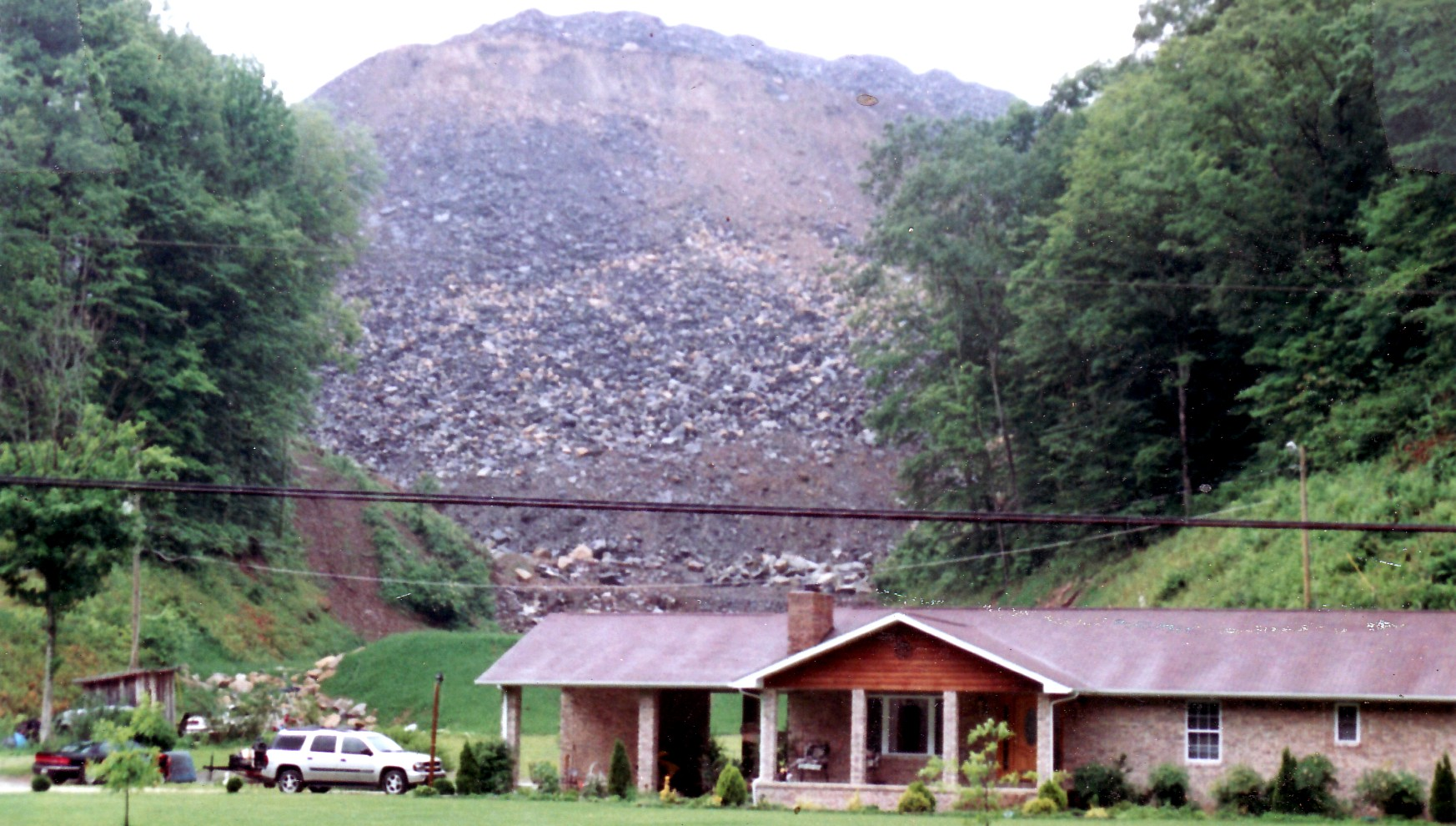
Mountaintop removal coal mining in Martin County, Kentucky

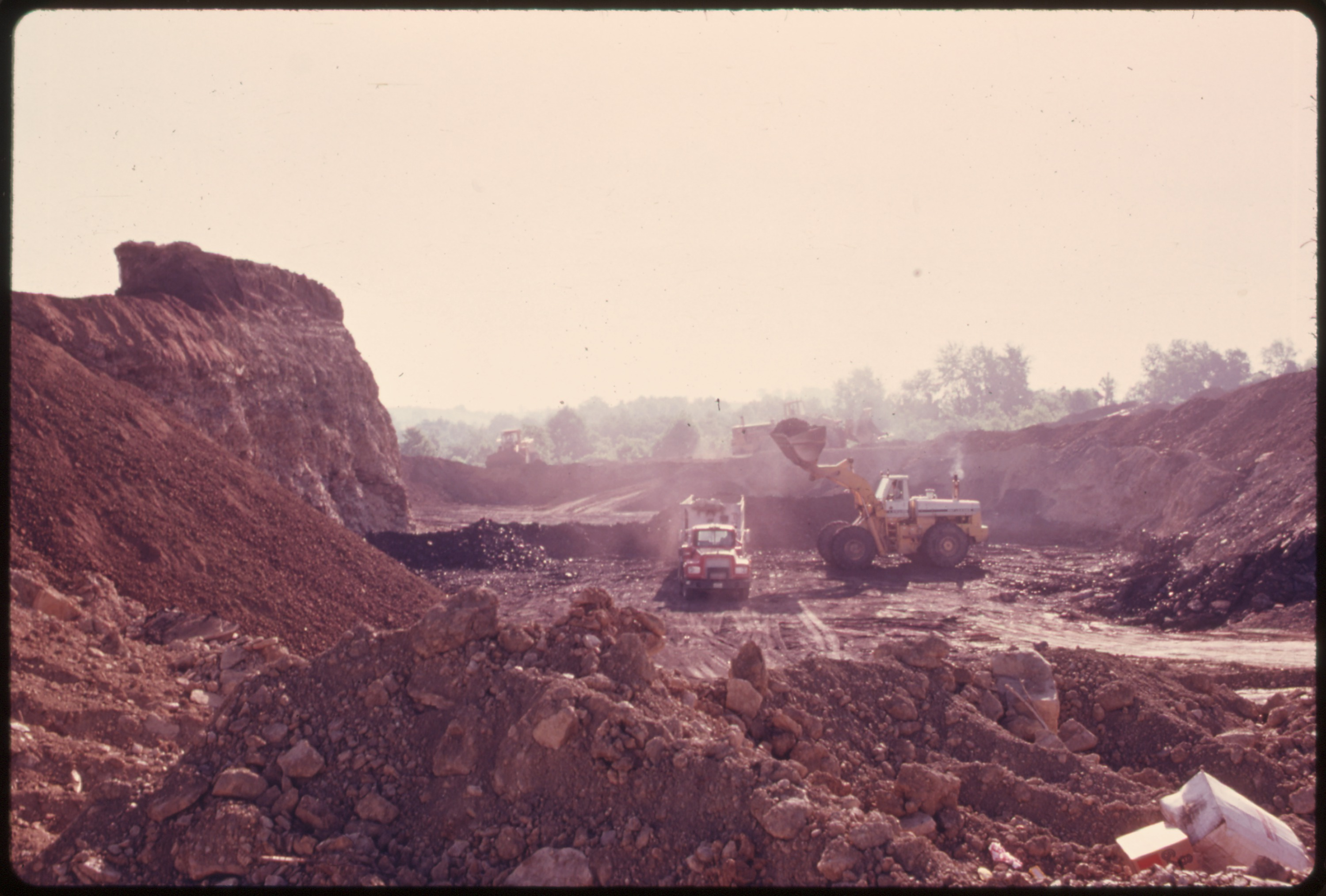
Strip mining in Barnesville, Ohio

Environmental justice and coal mining in Appalachia is the study of environmental justice – the interdisciplinary body of social science literature studying theories of the environment and justice; environmental laws, policies, and their implementations and enforcement; development and sustainability; and political ecology – in relation to coal mining in Appalachia.

The Appalachian region of the Southeastern United States is a leading producer of coal in the country. Research shows that residents who live near mountaintop removal (MTR) mines have higher mortality rates than average, and are more likely to live in poverty and be exposed to harmful environmental conditions than people in otherwise comparable parts of the region.

In the late 1990s, several Appalachian women, including Julia Bonds, began to speak out against MTR and its effects on the people and environment of mining communities. Research has shown that MTR causes "irreparable" environmental damage in Appalachia. The blasting of mountaintops has polluted streams and contaminated water supplies with toxic waste from coal processing called slurry ponds. Scientists have noted an increase in respiratory and heart problems among area residents, including lung cancer. Mortality rates and birth defect rates are higher in the areas surrounding surface mining locations.

Coal mining production in Appalachia declined from 1990 to 2015, but there is some debate over why. Cited factors include a rising demand for clean energy, environmental policies and regulations set forth by the Environmental Protection Agency (EPA), and globalization. The number of coal mining jobs in the region remained steady from 2000 to 2010, but declined by 37% between 2011 and 2015. Less production is responsible for much of this job loss, but improved mining techniques like mountain-top removal also contributed. Discourse around coal in the area has sparked a debate in academia over whether it creates wealth or poverty. The core debate centers around coal production's impact on the local and national economy.

== Background ==
=== Coal production ===
Appalachia is one of three coal-mining regions in the United States; the others are the Interior coal region, and the Western coal region, which includes the Powder River Basin. Eight states lie in the Appalachian coal region: Alabama, eastern Kentucky, Maryland, Ohio, Pennsylvania, Tennessee, Virginia, and West Virginia. West Virginia is the largest coal-producing state in Appalachia, and the second-largest coal-producing state in the United States, accounting for about 14% of the nation's total coal production in 2022 (the largest coal-producing state is Wyoming, which lies in the Western coal region and accounts for 41% of U.S. coal production). Two other states in the Appalachian coal region, Kentucky and Pennsylvania, account for 5% and 7% of U.S. coal production, respectively.

The coal industry in Appalachia has changed over time. According to U.S. Department of Energy's Energy Information Administration data, Central Appalachia—consisting of southern West Virginia, eastern Kentucky, western Virginia, and eastern Tennessee—made up almost 29% of U.S. coal production in the U.S. in 1990, but only about 13% by 2013. By contrast, coal production in Northern Appalachia has remained relatively stable, going from 16% in 1990 to 12.5% in 2013. As a result, "both regions account for nearly the same share of U.S. coal production" as of 2014.

In the Appalachian coal region, 80% of coal produced came from underground mines. This is a much higher percentage than in the Western coal region, where 92% of all coal produced comes from surface mines.

=== History ===
Historically, "the building of coal towns began in the 1880s, peaked in the 1920s, and virtually ended with the coming of the Great Depression" when the availability of other forms of energy—namely, oil, gas, and hydroelectricity—reduced demand for coal. The company town was particularly dominant in southern Appalachia; in 1925, almost 80% of West Virginia coal miners lived in company towns, while an average of 64.4% of coal miners in Maryland, Virginia, Kentucky, and Tennessee lived in company towns.

== Impacts of coal mining in Appalachia ==
Since 1995, the Appalachian region has produced about half of the United States' coal. Although Appalachia has played a large role in contributing to the coal supply of the United States, the communities surrounding such mining practices have suffered immensely. Several studies have shown disparities between mining communities and non-mining communities in terms of public health, environmental degradation, pollution, and overall quality of life in Appalachia. Variations of surface coal mining techniques in Appalachia include contour, area, high-wall, auger, and mountaintop removal mining (MTR).

=== Surface mining ===
The damage caused by mountaintop removal strip mining has had a calculable effect on the environment and communities in Appalachia. The resource rich region remains economically deprived and suffers from the externalities of coal mining, including the health problems caused by coal pollution. The Office of Surface Mining (OSM) is the federal agency tasked with regulating strip-mining under the Federal Surface Mining Control and Reclamation Act (SMCRA). According to OSM, "[t]o the extent that low income populations are prevalent in the coalfields, the impacts of mountaintop mining are felt disproportionately by these environmental justice populations".

Most local residents are unable to see the extent of the damage that has been caused by surface mining. Geologist Sean P. Bemis investigated claims by local residents that the extent of the damage was not easily visible. In interviews with the research team, former miner Chuck Nelson stated that the extent of the destruction is only clearly visible from a plane. Coalfield resident activist Maria Gunnoe gave a similar account to the researchers, saying "I never realized it was so bad. My first fly-over with South Wings [non-profit aviation organization], and that right there is what really fired me up. When I got off the plane that day, I cried all the way across the tarmac, all the way home ..." The Government Accountability Office (GAO) confirmed this in a 2009 report:

Despite the public scrutiny that surface mining in mountainous areas has received, the public is limited in its ability to access information on the scope of these operations - their size, location, and how long they have been in operation - and on what the mountain can be expected to look like after mining operations have ceased and the land has been reclaimed

— Government Accountability Office (GAO), as quoted in Fighting King Coal

There are no official records of the total number of "disturbed acres" that have resulted from surface mining, but geospatial analysis has shown that between 1.05 million and 1.28 million acres of land and more than 500 mountains in West Virginia, Kentucky, Tennessee, and Virginia have been surface mined.

=== Mountaintop removal ===
One form of surface mining is mountaintop removal (MTR). This technique can remove as much as 800 to 1000 feet from mountaintops, in order to reach coal seams not accessible by other surface mining techniques. This practice was used on a small scale in the 1970s, and became heavily used in the 1990s because of the increased demand for high-grade low-sulfur coal following passage of the Clean Air Act Amendments of 1990.

The process of MTR begins by the clearcutting of trees on a chosen mountaintop, which is then blasted with explosives. Next all of the excess soil and rock or "spoil" is moved out; after the mining operation is complete this will be replaced. Once this rock has been disturbed, swelling will take place; the spoil will expand by fifteen to twenty five percent, due to air incorporation and voids. The excess spoil or "overburden" then is dumped into nearby streams or valleys, a process referred to as a "valley fill". Mountaintop mining and valley fills can lead to large scale landscape changes, which may include: conversion of habitats, fragmentation of forests, and loss of large tracts of forested land. Since the boom in MTR usage, as many as 500 mountaintops have been destroyed and 2000 miles of waterways have been filled.

There also may be adverse effects on the people living in these Appalachian mining communities. Michael Hendryx, a researcher at Indiana State University, stated in an interview with Yale that, "The number of excess deaths every year comes to about 1,200 people who live in these mining communities compared to other parts of Appalachia." The diseases most prevalent in these MTR areas include: cardiovascular disease, lung cancer, and COPD. These are not only occupational diseases of coal miners but also of the general public. The risk of birth defects, especially congenital heart defects, increases by as much as 181% in MTR areas. Researchers are beginning to research smaller particulate matter as the cause of these illnesses and increased mortality.

=== Effects on health ===
Several studies have found that communities within the Appalachian region surrounding coal mining practices disproportionately experience negative health effects than communities with no coal mining. Such health disparities are largely attributed to the contamination of water and land associated with coal surface mining. MTR has increased salinity, metals, magnesium, and sulfates within Appalachian watersheds, threatening human health. Sixty-three percent of stream beds near coalfields within the Appalachian mountains have been identified as "impaired" due to high toxic chemical and metal contamination.

In West Virginia, 14 counties are experiencing water that exceeds safe drinking water standards by seven times more than non-mining counties. Combustion waste and fly ash from MTR lend to toxic dusts pollute the surrounding air and have contributed to increased levels of cancer, cardiovascular disease, liver disease, and kidney disease. Public health costs of pollution in Appalachia are upwards of 75 billion dollars a year.

In an analysis of health-related quality of life that compared United States residents in counties with and without coal mining, it was reported that residents in counties with coal mining had, "significantly fewer healthy days for both physical and mental health". The same study highlights strong correlations between heavy coal mining counties and a greater risk of depression and severe psychological distress. Areas in Appalachia with coal surface mining exhibit greater rates of adverse health effects and reduced self-rated health in comparison to the national average. In addition, studies from the National Institute for Occupational Safety and Health have concluded a high "relationship between surface coal mining jobs and the prevalence of pneumoconiosis". Lastly, through examination of mortality rates, county-level poverty rates, and coal mining within counties of Appalachia, it was identified that coal mining areas of Appalachia experienced higher mortality rates then counties with no coal mining.

The coal mining industry has had many lasting health effects not only on the workers in the industry but also on the people who live close to the mines. People that are exposed to the particles released from coal mining experience illnesses such as rheumatoid arthritis, pneumoconiosis, and cardiovascular disease:

- Rheumatoid arthritis (RA): This disease is both an autoimmune and an inflammatory disease. The disease causes the human immune system to attack healthy cells in the body because it believes that they are a threat. This is what causes inflammation, which is usually found in the joints. The longer rheumatoid arthritis exists in the joint the greater the chance for damage to joint tissue becomes. (CDC, 2022). One of the exposures that coal miners face that leads to this disease is silica. A study done by Schmajuk et al. found that between their study in 2017 and their study in 2019, 56% of their participants were diagnosed with any form of arthritis. 20% of participants had developed rheumatoid arthritis. Within their discussion section it was stated that "coal mining work and occupational silica exposure are both associated with threefold odds of RA."
- Pneumoconiosis: This disease has three different subtypes which are asbestosis, silicosis and coal workers' pneumoconiosis (also known as black lung). The American Lung Association (ALA) notes that black lung disease is caused by the inhalation of coal dust over long periods of time, once the coal particles are in the lungs your body will try to remove them from the lungs. Overtime inflammation occurs and once it is severe enough scar tissue can form on the lungs. However black lung disease is not the only form of pneumoconiosis that coal workers are exposed to. They also often face exposure to silica dust because of the drilling process. Research conducted by Blackley, et al. found that a great portion of pneumoconiosis found in the United States is located within central Appalachia. In their discussion section they stated, "One in 5 if these miners in central Appalachia have CWP (coal workers' pneumoconiosis), a significant predictor for developing PMF (progressive massive fibrosis). Approximately 1 in 20 long-tenured miners in central Appalachia has CWP that has progressed to PMF, a condition that is by definition totally disabling."
- Cardiovascular Disease: Epidemiological research has found that environmental air pollution is strongly associated with increased risks of cardiovascular diseases, including coronary artery disease, heart failure, stroke, and elevated cardiovascular morbidity and mortality rates. Populations exposed to pollutants such as fine particulate matter, including PM2.50 and nitrogen dioxide, faced heightened risks of developing such conditions. Long-term exposure to PM2.5 has been associated with ischemic heart disease, stroke, and increased mortality. Furthermore, in areas where coal mining are prevalent, residents are often exposed not only to ambient air pollution, but also water contaminated with toxic substances originating from coal mining and processing activities. Furthermore, research done by Finch and Conklin has found that exposure to specific air pollutants is associated with changes to the structure of the heart. Pollutants may induce cardiac hypertrophy, or the thickening of the heart muscle, thereby increasing the number of contractions required per minute to supply adequate oxygen and nutrients to the body. This response, however, can lead to cardiac overload and contribute to the development of cardiovascular disease. Specifically, exposure to nitrogen dioxide, PM10, and PM2.5 particles have been linked to the enlargement of both the left and right ventricles, which elevates arterial blood pressure.

=== Environmental impacts ===
Coal surface mining has heavily altered the hydrological cycle and landscape of Appalachia causing environmental degradation and contributing to ecosystem damages beyond repair. Surface coal mining in Appalachia has contributed to the destruction of over 500 mountain tops. In addition, it has led to the clearance of over 1 million acres of forests and contributed to the degradation or permanent loss of over 12000 miles of streams crucial to the Appalachian watershed from 1985- 2001. Mountaintop removal has caused the native Appalachian forests to shift into grasslands/shrubland ecosystems. Pericak et al. in their research noticed that this practice has, "lowered the local topographic complexity, lowered the average slope by nearly 10°, and created novel plateau-like landscapes."

Increased salinity and metal contamination of the Appalachian streams have led to toxic effects of fish and bird species. Although there are actions taken to neutralize sulfuric acid in the waste created by mountaintop removal, other forms of mining drainage do occur. Pericak et al. stated, "The net weathering reactions generate alkaline mine drainage which is characterized by elevated ion concentrations of sulfate (SO42-), calcium (Ca2+), magnesium (Mg2+), bicarbonate (HCO3-), and a suite of other elements including major aquatic pollutants like selenium (Se)". Mountaintop removal, or MTR, is a type of surface mining that has played a major role in negatively impacting the Appalachian environment. When MTR is used, it causes much of the contaminants from the process to be emptied into surrounding valleys which, oftentimes, make their way into nearby streams. These wastes are disposed in "valley fills" which have collapsed and produced heavy flash floods in Appalachia. The Environmental Protection Agency approximates that between 1985 and 2001, over 700 miles worth of streams in the Appalachians were covered by these "valley fills" due to mountaintop removal coal mining.

The practice of mountaintop removal itself causes harm to the environment, however there are other hidden polluting factors within the process. One of these is the transportation of the coal to the plants that it will be refined in. Operation of large transportation vehicles use fossil fuels as a gas source which releases CO^{2} into the air. At the same time, the transportation of the coal further spreads the particulate matter from the mining process into nearby towns. Anejia et al. found that, "...coal trucks frequently travel through communities located in steeply sided valleys, or hollows, where homes are situated very close to the narrow roads. Some communities experience up to hundreds of truck trips a day. Coal trucks emit dust directly from their tires, bodies, and beds."

=== Social and economic impacts ===
Appalachia has historically been one of the most impoverished regions of the country. There is a debate about whether coal production is a source of wealth or poverty in Appalachia. The U.S. Geological Survey and the U.S. Bureau of Mines state that there is a coal-wealth paradox in Appalachia. Although Appalachia is home to some of the largest coal mines, the average per capita income is only about 68% of the national per capita income. However, work done by Black and Sanders shows that between 1970 and 1980 the increase in coal production substantially boosted the pay of low skilled workers in Appalachia and likely caused a decrease in income inequality.

Although coal mining industries are often associated with increased jobs and economic growth, this association does not hold for Appalachia, where two-thirds of the counties have higher levels of unemployment than the nation and per capita personal wages falling 20% lower than the nation. More specifically, in Hendryx and Zullig's comparative analysis of Appalachia counties, those with coal mining had greater economic disparities and more poverty than those without industry. The shift towards coal surface mining from underground mining led to a 50% decline in mining jobs from 1985 to 2005, and competition from cheap natural gas also decreased demand for coal, leading some mines to close or reduce extraction, which further increased unemployment.

During the 1990s coal mining and other extractive businesses took a sharp decline in Appalachia. This caused the economy to take a sharp decline and many people found themselves without jobs and it caused widespread poverty. Furthermore, those who had worked in the mining industry found that their bodies were left damaged and in constant pain. The grueling work that these people did left them looking for relief from the pain and many people of Appalachia turned to opioids. From 2014 to 2015, overall mining employment for Appalachia has dropped by 15.9%.

With the decrease in economic opportunities for the people of Appalachia came despair that left many hopeless for their future. This causes diseases of despair such as alcohol and drug overdose (both prescription and illegal), suicide, and alcoholic liver disease. (Marberry & Werner, 2020). Furthermore, it is believed that diseases of despair may be connected to solastalgia. Solastalgia is a, "psychoterratic illness, which is 'defined as earth-related mental illness where people's mental wellbeing … is threatened by the severing of 'healthy' links between themselves and their home/territory.'"

A NASA study states that promises of beneficial post-mining development in the Appalachian region have yet to materialize. A 2017 study found that neighborhoods closest to coal impoundments are "slightly more likely to have higher rates of poverty and unemployment, even after controlling for rurality, mining-related variables, and spatial dependence".

=== Specific events ===
==== Buffalo Creek Disaster ====
In 1972, a slurry pond built by Pittson Coal Company collapsed. In what is known as the Buffalo Creek disaster 130 million gallons of sludge flooded Buffalo Creek. More recently, a waste impoundment owned by Massey burst in Kentucky, flooding nearby streams with 250 tons of coal slurry.

==== Upper Big Branch disaster ====
On April 5, 2010, there was an explosion at the Upper Big Branch mine in Raleigh County, West Virginia, owned by Massey Energy. The explosion took the life of 29 miners and is labeled the worst accident in the United States since 1970. In 2015 professor Nicole Fabricant wrote, "Because Massey Energy cut corners on safety regulations—in this case, failing to provide appropriate ventilation for methane—the company essentially created the tragedy of Upper Big Branch. The Mine Safety and Health Administration found that flagrant safety violations contributed to a coal dust explosion. It issued 369 citations in 2011, assessing $10.8 million in penalties."

==== Marsh Fork Elementary School Protests ====
During the time that this school was in operation the citizens began to have major concerns about how close coal mining operations were to the school. Fabricant stated that, "The school sits next to a coal silo and just 400 feet downslope from an impoundment that holds back billions of gallons of coal slurry." Along with that residents were worried about air quality and the possibility for particulate matter to linger in the air near the school. After large protests from the community the children were moved to another school for their safety.

==== Farmington Mine disaster ====
The explosion of the Consol No. 9 mine near Farmington, West Virginia happened on November 20, 1968. This disaster took the lives of 78 men who were never recovered from the mine. The factors contributed to this disaster were stated as, "They did not want to comply with the Federal Coal Mine Health and Safety Act... And because of the lack of due diligence, that's what happened at No. 9 that caused it to blow up." After a few years the mine went to re-open and Larry Layne was charged with figuring out what happened. While on the site Larry ran into an electrician to whom he asked about the Mod's Run fan, why it wasn't working and why nobody knew that it was down. Larry found out that the alarm for this ventilation fan was disabled. When Larry asked why the electrician responded with, "The chief electrician said that the fan kept going down, and they were having trouble with it. And every time the fan went down, they didn't want to take the men out of the mine".

== Law and regulation ==
The Black Lung Benefits Act of 1972 provided payments to coal miners disabled from Coalworker's pneumoconiosis or "black lung disease" and their dependent survivors.

The 1977 Surface Mining Control and Reclamation Act (SMCRA) created two programs: one for regulating active coal mines and a second for reclaiming abandoned mine lands.

In the view of legal scholar Jedediah Purdy, the Clean Air Act and the Clean Water Act improved the quality of air and water for much of America, but created "sacrificial zones" in America, including coal mining communities in Appalachia, that hid the environmental effects of industry and agriculture from people in the suburbs while increasing exposure to danger for people who lived near sites of pollution.

These laws, along with the National Environmental Policy Act form the basis in law for regulation of coal mining, including mountaintop removal mining. Regulations issued on the basis of these laws focus on issuing or withholding permits for new mining operations; the regulations themselves have been contested. As of 2012, these laws did not take into account direct effects on communities near mines nor economic or racial disparities in those communities, and regulations and executive orders issued that attempted to address such environmental justice concerns had been struck down, and legal challenges based on potential effects on local communities generally failed, since neither the law nor regulations were written to address these concerns and judges ruled based on what the law and regulations actually said.

The Affordable Care Act is a federal government health care law; it includes provisions that amend the Black Lung Benefits program. The Black Lung Benefits program details the extent to which coal miners have their medical coverage compensated by the federal government. The ACA provisions that amend the Black Lung Benefits program are commonly known as the Byrd Amendments taking its name from the late West Virginia Congressman Robert Byrd. The Byrd Amendments are found in Section 1556 of the ACA. Among the many protections the Byrd Amendments provides coal miners, it covers medical expenses for coal miners who worked at least 15 years underground (or comparable surface mining) and who have a totally disabling respiratory impairment. Further, it shifts the burden of proof of disability due to "black lung disease" from these coal miners back to the coal companies. Coalworker's pneumoconiosis or "black lung disease" can be a common health problem faced by retired coal miners.

=== The Surface Mining Control and Reclamation Act of 1977 ===
Early attempts to regulate strip-mining on the state level were largely unsuccessful due to lax enforcement. The Appalachian Group to Save the Land and the People was founded in 1965 to stop surface mining. In 1968, Congress held the first hearings on strip mining. Ken Hechler introduced the first strip-mining abolition bill in Congress in 1971. Though this bill was not passed, provisions establishing a process to reclaim abandoned strip mines and allowing citizens to sue regulatory agencies became parts of SMCRA.

SMCRA also created the Office of Surface Mining, an agency within the Department of the Interior, to promulgate regulations, to fund state regulatory and reclamation efforts, and to ensure consistency among state regulatory programs.

=== Regulation procedures and updates to coal supply chains ===
In comments submitted to the Environmental Protection Agency (EPA), Betsy Monseu, CEO of the American Coal Council (ACC), stated, "Changes to regulations, inconsistencies in regulations, and regulatory uncertainty affect businesses large and small. There are real consequences to people, their livelihoods, and their families." Although the environmental impacts caused by coal mining are increasing, the EPA has begun to see the benefits of coal ash. In 2020, the EPA stated, "Coal ash can be beneficially used to make new products, such as wallboard or concrete. Due to the many potentially useful properties of coal ash, a vast array of businesses from construction to agriculture and manufacturing choose coal ash as a substitute for other materials".

The ACC has been urging the EPA to consider using coal combustion residuals (CCR), which have been labelled as environmentally beneficial by the ACC. Although the EPA has researched and ruled CCR as a beneficial alternative, no action has been taken. In order for CCR to be recognized as an appropriate solution, the EPA must evaluate coal combustion residuals with four criteria:

1. The CCR must provide a functional benefit;
2. The CCR must substitute for the use of a virgin material, conserving natural resources that would otherwise need to be obtained through practices such as extraction;
3. The use of the CCRs must meet relevant product specifications, regulatory standards, or design standards, when available, and where such specifications or standards have not been established, CCR may not be used in excess quantities; and
4. When un-encapsulated use of CCR involves placement on the land of 12,400 tons or more in non-roadway applications, the user must demonstrate and keep records, and provide such documentation upon request, that environmental releases to groundwater, surface water, soil, and air are comparable to or lower than those from analogous products made without CCR, or that environmental releases to groundwater, surface water, soil, and air will be at or below relevant regulatory and health-based benchmarks for human and ecological receptors during use.

=== Governmental influence on environmental movements ===
In 1967, Louie Nunn was elected governor of Kentucky. He was a member of the Republican party and was elected as part of a national effort to respond to Johnson's Great Society legislation. This legislation was intended to promote civil rights and help social movements have a safety net as they protested. In the work, "To Live Here, You Have to Fight: How Women Led Appalachian Movements for Social Justice" author Jessica Wilkerson stated, "...Nunn vowed to use his power to bring an end to the Appalachian Volunteers in Kentucky…" Legislation that was passed by Congress allowed governors to decide the requirements that made an organization a Community Action Agency, which was an important designation to have in order to qualify for governmental funding.

== Advocacy groups ==
The study of justice has often been defined by the theories of John Rawls. Justice theory has focused on the principles by which to distribute goods in a society. The defining arguments of the environmental justice movement were about patterns that violated some of these distributive principles of justice theory. Several contemporary scholars have developed theories of justice that are broader than the distributional theory of justice.

The study of justice theory, as applied to the environmental justice, has primarily focused on "maldistribution". In other words, this area of study has concentrated on the fact that poor communities, indigenous communities, and communities of color are often disproportionately impacted by environmentally-related negative externalities and receive less environmental protection.

Environmental justice has been identified by scholars as a movement that acknowledged the disproportionate effects of environmental damage and toxic contamination on the poor and people of color. It has also been noted that the race and class of the parties effects the community's chances of success in enacting reforms. Environmental justice groups were community grassroots organizations that combined environmentalism with issues of race a class equality. These groups organized in opposition to the disproportionate threat mountain communities faced from health hazards like acid mine drainage.

=== Save Our Cumberland Mountains ===
Save Our Cumberland Mountains (SOCM, pronounced "sock 'em") was founded when thirteen residents of the Tennessee coalfields petitioned their state government to make coal landholders pay a fair share of taxes. SOCM later grew into one of the most significant community organizations in the region and went on to lead a major legislative campaign against employers who replaced their permanent employees with long-term temporary workers.

J.W. Bradley was the president of SOCM for its first five years. He had worked in the deep mines and was outspoken about what he called the "evils of strip mining." He believed in using litigation to pursue reform. In 1974, SOCM established the East Tennessee Research Corporation as a public interest law firm. By 1976, SOCM was trying to ban strip mining and targeting individual strip mining operations.

An attorney who worked with SOCM in the 1970s has written that very few people of color were involved with SOCM in the early years. He highlights the importance of regional organizations like the Highlander Research and Education Center that "seek to bring together diverse communities to share their knowledge about the inner dynamics of environmental justice issues".

=== Mountain Justice ===
Mountain Justice began in 2005 as a summer-long campaign for the abolition of MTM. The organization was started after a 2004 mining accident in Virginia. A three-year-old was killed when a boulder rolled off a MTM site above his home. The first MJ meeting took place in Knoxville, Tennessee and included activists from Coal River Mountain Watch (CRMW), the Sierra Club, Appalachian Voices, and Katuah Earth First (KEF!). Their mission statement includes a commitment to non-violence.

=== Keepers of the Mountain ===
Keepers of the Mountain was founded by Larry Gibson and Bill DePaulo in July 2004. Larry was inspired to create an organization that protested against mountaintop removal after he learned that it was that because of his childhood home shaking in the mid-1990s. Although this organization has its roots in the mountains it partakes in other works of social and environmental justice. Such projects include bringing clean water to O'Toole, WV. and The Dandelion Project (aimed at creating sustainable energy alternatives in low-income or underserved communities).

== See also ==
- Appalachian music
- Environmental issues in Appalachia
- Hobet Coal Mine
- History of coal mining in the United States
- RECLAIM Act
- Social and economic stratification in Appalachia
- Stream Protection Rule
