= Boys in the Pits =

2000 book by Robert McIntosh

Boys in the Pits: Child Labour in Coal Mines
- Author: Robert McIntosh
- Publisher: McGill-Queen's University Press
- Publication date: 2000

Boys in the Pits: Child Labour in Coal Mines is a 2000 book by Robert McIntosh, published by McGill-Queen's University Press. The book is about child labour in Canada in the 19th and early 20th centuries, with special reference to the history of boys, aged 8 to 15, who worked in coal mines. These boys worked underground, leading horses along subterranean roads, manipulating ventilation doors, helping miners cut and lift tons of coal, and filling wagons with freshly mined coal.

Robert McIntosh is an employee at the National Archives of Canada.

== See also ==
- Big Coal: The Dirty Secret Behind America's Energy Future (2006)
- Coal River (2008)
- King Coal (1917)
- Miners' Lung: A History of Dust Disease in British Coal Mining (2007)
- Moving Mountains: How One Woman and Her Community Won Justice From Big Coal (2007)
