= Miners' Lung (book) =

2007 book by Arthur McIvor and Ronald Johnson

Miners' Lung: A History of Dust Disease in British Coal Mining
- Author: Arthur McIvor; Ronald Johnston
- Language: English
- Series: Studies in Labour History
- Genre: Non-fiction
- Publication date: 2007
- ISBN: 978-0-7546-3673-1

Miners' Lung: A History of Dust Disease in British Coal Mining by Arthur McIvor and Ronald Johnston is a 2007 book which is part of the Studies in Labour History series..

== See also ==
- Big Coal: The Dirty Secret Behind America's Energy Future (2006)
- Boys in the Pits: Child Labour in Coal Mines (2000)
- Coal River (2008)
- King Coal (1917)
- Moving Mountains: How One Woman and Her Community Won Justice From Big Coal (2007)
