= Larry Gibson =

Larry Gibson may refer to:

- Larry Gibson (environmentalist) (1946–2012), anti-mining environmentalist from West Virginia
- Larry S. Gibson (born 1942), law professor, lawyer, political organizer, and historian
- Larry M. Gibson (born 1947), American businessman
