= Mountaintop Removal (film) =

2007 documentary film directed by Michael O'Connell

- Directed by: Michael C. O'Connell
- Narrated by: William Mapother
- Release date: 2007
- Running time: 74 minutes
- Country: United States
- Language: English

Mountaintop Removal is a 2007 documentary film directed by Michael O'Connell. The film explores how mountaintop removal mining in West Virginia has affected local communities. Filmed over two years, Mountain Top Removal features community advocates, such as Ed Wiley, Larry Gibson, Julia Bonds, Maria Gunnoe, and Mountain Justice Summer volunteers, in their efforts to oppose the destruction of Southern Appalachia's natural landscape. The film includes commentary from Jeff Goodell, author of Big Coal: The Dirty Secret Behind America's Energy Future, geologists Dr. William Schlesinger and Dr. Peter Taft, and also Bill Raney, president of the West Virginia Coal Association.

Mountain Top Removal won the Reel Current Award (presented by Al Gore) at the 2008 Nashville Film Festival. The film also received a Jury award at the 2008 Wild and Scenic Film Festival, an Audience Award at the 2008 Woods Hole Film Festival and was screened at The Lincoln Center on Earth Day April 22, 2008. Mountain Top Removal was distributed nationwide on PBS through NETA. The film's soundtrack includes music by Jim Lauderdale, Donna the Buffalo, John Specker, and Sarah Hawker. The film is narrated by William Mapother.

== See also ==
- Burning the Future: Coal in America
- The Last Mountain
