= List of books about coal mining =

Books and some articles relating to coal mining, especially historical.

== Current conditions ==
- Burns, Daniel. The modern practice of coal mining (1907)
- Chirons, Nicholas P. Coal Age Handbook of Coal Surface Mining (1978) ISBN 0-07-011458-7
- Hamilton, Michael S. Mining Environmental Policy: Comparing Indonesia and the USA (Burlington, VT: Ashgate, 2005). (ISBN 0-7546-4493-6).
- Hayes, Geoffrey. Coal Mining (2004), 32 pp
- National Energy Information Center. "Greenhouse Gases, Climate Change, Energy".
- Charles V. Nielsen and George F. Richardson. 1982 Keystone Coal Industry Manual (1982)
- Saleem H. Ali. "Minding our Minerals, 2006."
- Speight, James G, "An Introduction to Petroleum Technology, Economics, and Politics," John Wiley & Sons 2011.
- Trade and Industry, UK Department of. "The Coal Authority". Archived from the original on 2008-10-13.
- World Coal Institute. The Coal Resource (2005) covers all aspects of the coal industry in 48 pp.
- Woytinsky, W. S., and E. S. Woytinsky. World Population and Production Trends and Outlooks (1953) pp 840–881; with many tables and maps on the worldwide coal industry in 1950

== Fiction and poetry ==
- Brierley, Walter. Means Test Man (1935).
- Chaplin, Sid.The Thin Seam (1949).
- Cookson, Catherine.Tilly Trotter (1980), and other books by this author.
- Cronin, A. J. The Stars Look Down (1935), The Citadel (1937).
- Davies, Idris. Gwalia Deserta (1938) and The Angry Summer: A Poem of 1926 (1943).
- Giardina, Denise. Storming Heaven (1988), The Unquiet Earth (1992).
- Grisham, John. Gray Mountain (2014)
- Harrison, Tony. "v." (1985).
- Hensher, Philip.The Northern Clemency (2008).
- Heslop, Harold. Last Cage Down (1935).
- Jones, Jack. Black Parade (1935).
- Jones, Lewis. Cwmardy (1937) and We Live (1939).
- Kirk, Sam. The Coal Boat (2018).
- Lawrence, D. H. Sons and Lovers (1913).
- Lillo, Baldomero. Sub terra (1904).
- Llewellyn, Richard. How Green Was My Valley (1939).
- Rosenberg, Madelyn. Canary in the Coal Mine (2013).
- Peace, David. GB84 (2004).
- Sinclair, Upton. King Coal (1917), The Coal War (1976).
- Verne, Jules. The Child of the Cavern (1877).
- Welsh, James C. Songs of A Miner (1917), The Underworld (1920), and The Morlocks (1924).
- Wiseman, Ellen Marie. "The Coal River" (2015).
- Zola, Emile. Germinal (1885).

== Coal mining history ==
- Freese, Barbara, Coal: A Human History (2004). ISBN 0142000981.
- Jeffrey, E. C. Coal and Civilization. 1925.

=== Britain ===
==== Bibliographic guides ====
- Benson, J., Thompson, C.H. & Neville, R.G. Bibliography of the British coal industry. 1981
- British Library, Coal mining (Social Sciences Collection Guides: Topical Bibliographies)
- Galloway, R.L. Annals of coal mining and the coal trade. – v1 of the 1971 reprint has a bibliography in the introduction.
- Linsley, S.M. The Coal Industry – A Select Bibliography. Durham Mining Museum
- Mining History Network Bibliography of British Mining History: Published Since 1987. Despite the title there is earlier material included.
- North of England Institute of Mining and Mechanical Engineers. Nicholas Wood Memorial Library. History of mining in the UK: some useful books. 2018

==== Histories and manuals ====
- Ashton, T. S. & Sykes, J. The coal industry of the eighteenth century. 1929.
- Baylies, Carolyn. The History of the Yorkshire Miners, 1881–1918 Routledge (1993).
- Benson, John. "Coalmining" in Chris Wrigley, ed. A History of British industrial relations, 1875–1914 (Univ of Massachusetts Press, 1982), pp 187–208.
- Benson, John. British Coal-Miners in the Nineteenth Century: A Social History Holmes & Meier, (1980).
- Buxton, N.K. The economic development of the British coal industry: from Industrial Revolution to the present day. 1979.
- Coombes, B. L. These Poor Hands: The Autobiography of a Miner Working in South Wales (1939).
- Dron, Robert W. The economics of coal mining (1928).
- Fine, B. The Coal Question: Political Economy and Industrial Change from the Nineteenth Century to the Present Day (1990).
- Galloway, R.L. Annals of coal mining and the coal trade. First series [to 1835] 1898; Second series. [1835–80] 1904. Reprinted 1971
- Galloway, Robert L. A History Of Coal Mining In Great Britain (1882) Online at Open Library
- Griffin, A. R. The British coalmining industry: retrospect and prospect. 1977.
- Hanley, James. Grey Children: A Study in Humbug and Misery. 1937.
- Hatcher, John, et al. The History of the British Coal Industry (5 vol, Oxford U.P., 1984–87); 3000 pages of scholarly history
  - John Hatcher: The History of the British Coal Industry: Volume 1: Before 1700: Towards the Age of Coal (1993).
  - Michael W. Flinn, and David Stoker. History of the British Coal Industry: Volume 2. 1700–1830: The Industrial Revolution (1984).
  - Roy Church, Alan Hall and John Kanefsky. History of the British Coal Industry: Volume 3: Victorian Pre-Eminence
  - Barry Supple. The History of the British Coal Industry: Volume 4: 1913–1946: The Political Economy of Decline (1988) excerpt and ISBN 019828294X.
  - William Ashworth and Mark Pegg. History of the British Coal Industry: Volume 5: 1946–1982: The Nationalized Industry (1986)
- Heinemann, Margot. Britain's coal: A study of the mining crisis (1944).
- Hill, Alan. Coal: A Chronology for Britain. Northern Mine Research Society.
- Hull, Edward (1861). The coal-fields of Great Britain: their history, structure, and resources. London: 1861: Stanford.
- Hughes. Herbert W, A Text-Book of Mining: For the use of colliery managers and others (London, many editions 1892–1917), the standard British textbook for its era.
- Hull, Edward. Our coal resources at the close of the nineteenth century (1897) Online at Open Library. Stress on geology.
- Jaffe, James Alan. The Struggle for Market Power: Industrial Relations in the British Coal Industry, 1800–1840 (2003).
- Jevons, H.S. The British coal trade. 1920, reprinted 1969
- Jevons, W. Stanley. The Coal Question: An Inquiry Concerning the Progress of the Nation, and the Probable Exhaustion of Our Coal Mines (1865).
- Kirby, M.W. The British coalmining industry, 1870–1946: a political and economic history. 1977.
- Lucas, Arthur F. "A British Experiment in the Control of Competition: The Coal Mines Act of 1930." Quarterly Journal of Economics (1934): 418–441. in JSTOR
  - Prest, Wilfred. "The British Coal Mines Act of 1930, Another Interpretation." Quarterly Journal of Economics (1936): 313–332. in JSTOR
- Lewis, B. Coal mining in the eighteenth and nineteenth centuries. (Longman, 1971).
- McIvor, Arthur and Ronald Johnston. Miners' Lung: A History of Dust Disease in British Coal Mining 2007) ISBN 978-0-7546-3673-1
- Nef, J. U. Rise of the British coal industry. 2v 1932, a comprehensive scholarly survey
- Orwell, George. "Down the Mine" (The Road to Wigan Pier chapter 2, 1937) full text
- Rowe, J.W.F. Wages In the coal industry (1923).
- Tonge, James. The principles and practice of coal mining (1906)
- Waller, Robert. The Dukeries Transformed: A history of the development of the Dukeries coal field after 1920 (Oxford U.P., 1983) on the Dukeries
- Williams, Chris. Capitalism, community and conflict: The south Wales coalfield, 1898–1947 (U of Wales Press, 1998).

=== United States ===
- Burning the Future: Coal in America (film)
- Mountain Top Removal (film)
- Loeb, Penny. Moving Mountains: How One Woman and Her Community Won Justice from Big Coal (University of Kentucky Press, 2007).

==== Industry ====
- Adams, Sean Patrick, . "The US Coal Industry in the Nineteenth Century." EH.Net Encyclopedia, August 15, 2001 scholarly overview
- Adams, Sean Patrick. "Promotion, Competition, Captivity: The Political Economy of Coal," Journal of Policy History (2006) 18#1 pp 74–95 online
- Adams, Sean Patrick. Old Dominion, Industrial Commonwealth: Coal, Politics, and Economy in Antebellum America. Johns Hopkins University Press, 2004.
- Binder, Frederick Moore. Coal Age Empire: Pennsylvania Coal and Its Utilization to 1860. Harrisburg: Pennsylvania Historical and Museum Commission, 1974.
- Chandler, Alfred. "Anthracite Coal and the Beginnings of the 'Industrial Revolution' in the United States", Business History Review 46 (1972): 141–181. in JSTOR
- Davies, Edward J., II. The Anthracite Aristocracy: Leadership and Social Change in the Hard Coal Regions of Northeastern Pennsylvania, 1800–1930 (1985).
- DiCiccio, Carmen. Coal and Coke in Pennsylvania. Harrisburg: Pennsylvania Historical and Museum Commission, 1996
- Conley, Phil. History of West Virginia Coal Industry (Charleston: Education Foundation, 1960)
- Eavenson, Howard. The First Century and a Quarter of the American Coal Industry 1942.
- Verla R. Flores and A. Dudley Gardner. Forgotten Frontier: A History of Wyoming Coal Mining (1989)
- Goodell, Jeff. Big Coal: The Dirty Secret Behind America's Energy Future (2006) ISBN 978-0-618-87224-4
- Hudson Coal Company. The Story of Anthracite (New York, 1932), 425pp; Useful overview of the industry in the 20th century; fair-minded with an operators perspective
- Lauver, Fred J. "A Walk Through the Rise and Fall of Anthracite Might", Pennsylvania Heritage Magazine 27#1 (2001) online edition
- Long, Priscilla. Where the Sun Never Shines: A History of America's Bloody Coal Industry. Paragon, 1989.
- Nelson, Robert H. The Making of Federal Coal Policy (1983)
- Netschert, Bruce C. and Sam H. Schurr, Energy in the American Economy, 1850–1975: An Economic Study of Its History and Prospects. (1960)
- Parker, Glen Lawhon. The Coal Industry: A Study in Social Control (Washington: American Council on Public Affairs, 1940)
- Powell, H. Benjamin. Philadelphia's First Fuel Crisis. Jacob Cist and the Developing Market for Pennsylvania Anthracite. The Pennsylvania State University Press, 1978.
- Rottenberg, Dan. In the Kingdom of Coal: An American Family and the Rock That Changed the World (2003), owners' perspective
- Shnayerson, Michael. Coal River: How a Few Brave Americans Took on a Powerful Company–and the Federal Government–to Save the Land They Love (2008)
- Schurr, Sam H., and Bruce C. Netschert. Energy in the American Economy, 1850–1975: An Economic Study of Its History and Prospects. Johns Hopkins Press, 1960.
- Veenstra, Theodore A., and Wilbert G. Fritz. "Major Economic Tendencies in the Bituminous Coal Industry," Quarterly Journal of Economics 51#1 (1936) pp. 106–130 in JSTOR
- Vietor, Richard H. K. and Martin V. Melosi; Environmental Politics and the Coal Coalition Texas A&M University Press, 1980
- Warren, Kenneth. Triumphant Capitalism: Henry Clay Frick and the Industrial Transformation of America. Pittsburgh: University of Pittsburgh Press, 1996.

==== Primary sources ====
- United States Anthracite Coal Strike Commission, 1902–1903, Report to the President on the Anthracite Coal Strike of May–October, 1902 By United States Anthracite Coal Strike (1903) online edition
- Report of the United states coal commission.... (5 vol in 3; 1925) Official US government investigation of the 1922 anthracite strike. online vol 1–2
  - Tryon, Frederick Gale, and Joseph Henry Willits, eds. What the Coal Commission Found: An Authoritative Summary by the Staff (1925).
  - General policies committee of anthracite operators. The anthracite coal strike of 1922: A statement of its causes and underlying purposes (1923); Official statement by the operators. online

==== Coal miners and unions ====
- Arnold, Andrew B. Fueling the Gilded Age: Railroads, Miners, and Disorder in Pennsylvania Coal Country (2014)
- Aurand, Harold W. Coalcracker Culture: Work and Values in Pennsylvania Anthracite, 1835–1935 (2003).
- Baratz, Morton S. The Union and the Coal Industry (Yale University Press, 1955)
- Blatz, Perry. Democratic Miners: Work and Labor Relations in the Anthracite Coal Industry, 1875–1925. Albany: SUNY Press, 1994.
- Coal Mines Administration, U.S. Department Of The Interior. A Medical Survey of the Bituminous-Coal Industry. U.S. Government Printing Office. 1947.
- Corbin, David Alan Life, Work, and Rebellion in the Coal Fields: The Southern West Virginia Miners, 1880–1922 (1981)
- Dix, Keith. What's a Coal Miner to Do? The Mechanization of Coal Mining (1988), changes in the coal industry prior to 1940
- Dubofsky, Melvyn and Warren Van Tine, John L. Lewis: A Biography (1977), leader of Mine Workers union, 1920–1960
- Eller, Ronald D. Miners, Millhands, and Mountaineers: Industrialization of the Appalachian South, 1880–1930 1982.
- Price V. Fishback. Soft Coal, Hard Choices: The Economic Welfare of Bituminous Coal Miners, 1890–1930 (1992)
- Grossman, Jonathan. "The Coal Strike of 1902 – Turning Point in U.S. Policy" Monthly Labor Review October 1975. online
- Harvey, Katherine. The Best Dressed Miners: Life and Labor in the Maryland Coal Region, 1835–1910. Cornell University Press, 1993.
- Hinrichs; A. F. The United Mine Workers of America, and the Non-Union Coal Fields Columbia University, 1923.
- Lantz; Herman R. People of Coal Town Columbia University Press, 1958; on southern Illinois.
- Laslett, John H.M. ed. The United Mine Workers: A Model of Industrial Solidarity? Penn State University Press, 1996.
- Lewis, Ronald L. Black Coal Miners in America: Race, Class, and Community Conflict. University Press of Kentucky, 1987.
- Lunt, Richard D. Law and Order vs. the Miners: West Virginia, 1907–1933 Archon Books, 1979, On labor conflicts of the early 20th century.
- Lynch, Edward A. and David J. McDonald. Coal and Unionism: A History of the American Coal Miners' Unions (1939)
- McIntosh, Robert. Boys in the pits: Child labour in coal mines (McGill-Queen's Press-MQUP, 2000), Canadian mines
- Phelan, Craig. Divided Loyalties: The Public and Private Life of Labor Leader John Mitchell (1994)
- Rössel, Jörg. "Industrial Structure, Union Strategy and Strike Activity in Bituminous Coal Mining, 1881–1894", Social Science History (2002) 16#1 pp 1–32.
- Seltzer, Curtis. Fire in the Hole: Miners and Managers in the American Coal Industry University Press of Kentucky, 1985, conflict in the coal industry to the 1980s.
- Smith, Richard C. Human Crisis in the Kingdom of Coal Friendship Press, 1952, covers the plight of the coal worker in European and American coal centers.
- Trotter Jr., Joe William. Coal, Class, and Color: Blacks in Southern West Virginia, 1915–32 (1990)
- U.S. Immigration Commission, Report on Immigrants in Industries, Part I: Bituminous Coal Mining, 2 vols. Senate Document no. 633, 61st Cong., 2nd sess. (1911)
- Wallace, Anthony F.C. St. Clair. A Nineteenth-Century Coal Town's Experience with a Disaster-Prone Industry. Knopf, 1981.
- Ward, Robert D. and William W. Rogers, Labor Revolt in Alabama: The Great Strike of 1894 University of Alabama Press, 1965 online the coal strike

=== China ===
- Dorian, James P. Minerals, Energy, and Economic Development in China Clarendon Press, 1994
- Huaichuan Rui; Globalisation, Transition and Development in China: The Case of the Coal Industry Routledge, 2004
- Kuenzer, Claudia. Coal Mining in China (In: Schumacher-Voelker, E., and Mueller, B., (Eds.), 2007: BusinessFocus China, Energy: A Comprehensive Overview of the Chinese Energy Sector. gic Deutschland Verlag, 281 pp., ISBN 978-3-940114-00-6 pp. 62–68)
- Thomson; Elspeth. The Chinese Coal Industry: An Economic History Routledge 2003.
- Wu, Shellen Xiao. Empires of Coal: Fueling China's Entry into the Modern World Order, 1860–1920 (Stanford University Press, 2015) 266 pp. online review

=== Europe ===
- Parnell, Martin F. The German Tradition of Organized Capitalism: Self-Government in the Coal Industry Oxford University Press Inc., 1998
- Pounds, Norman J. G., and William N. Parker; Coal and Steel in Western Europe; the Influence of Resources and Techniques on Production Indiana University Press, 1957
- Pounds, Norman J. G. An Historical Geography of Europe, 1800–1914 (1993)
- Pounds, Norman J. G. The Ruhr: A Study in Historical and Economic Geography (1952)

=== Other ===
- Calderón, Roberto R. Mexican Coal Mining Labor in Texas & Coahuila, 1880–1930 (2000) 294pp.
- Frank, David. J. B. McLachlan: A Biography: The Story of a Legendary Labour Leader and the Cape Breton Coal Miners, (1999), in Canada
- Marsden, Susan, Coals to Newcastle: a History of Coal Loading at the Port of Newcastle, New South Wales 1797–1997 (2002) ISBN 0-9578961-9-0; Australia
- Nimura Kazuo, Andrew Gordon, and Terry Boardman; The Ashio Riot of 1907: A Social History of Mining in Japan Duke University Press, 1997
- A.K. Srivastava. Coal Mining Industry in India (1998) (ISBN 81-7100-076-2)

== See also ==
- Coal mining
