= Clara Bingham =

American writer, journalist, and producer (born 1963)

- Born: 1963 (age 62–63); Louisville, Kentucky
- Occupations: Journalist, author
- Years active: 1985–present
- Website: www.clarabingham.com

Clara Bingham (born 1963) is an American journalist and author.

== Early life and education ==
Bingham was born in 1963 into a newspaper family founded by Robert Worth Bingham in Louisville, Kentucky. She moved to New York City in 1968. She completed high school at the Madeira School in 1981, and graduated from Harvard University in 1985 with a degree in History and Literature. At Harvard, she served as co-news editor of the Harvard Independent.

== Career ==
Bingham's most recent book The Movement: How Women’s Liberation Transformed America 1963-1973 was published July 30, 2024, by One Signal Publishers (a division of Simon & Schuster), and is an Amazon best seller. Published in 2016, Bingham's third book, Witness to the Revolution: Radicals, Resisters, Vets, Hippies, and the Year America Lost Its Mind and Found Its Soul (2016), was named one of the best books of 2016 by the St. Louis Post Dispatch, and one of the 40 best books of 2016 by the New York Post. Bingham is featured in the six-episode ABC series 1969. Her second book, Class Action: The Landmark Case that Changed Sexual Harassment Law (co-written with Laura Leedy Gansler 1999) which was adapted into the 2005 feature film North Country. Class Action was a 2002 Los Angeles Times best book of the year and won the AAUW Speaking Out For Justice Award in 2007. Bingham's first book was Women on the Hill: Challenging the Culture of Congress (1996).

As a Washington, D.C. correspondent for Newsweek magazine from 1989 to 1993, Bingham covered the George H. W. Bush administration leading up to and during the 1992 presidential election. Her writing has appeared widely in publications including, most recently, Vanity Fair, Lit Hub, The Huffington Post, The Guardian, The Washington Spectator, The Daily Beast, and many others. She also worked as a stringer for United Press International in Papua New Guinea, and as a press secretary for the 1988 presidential campaign of Democratic nominee Michael Dukakis.

Bingham wrote an exposé about the Air Force Academy rape scandal for Vanity Fair in 2003, which earned her the 2004 Exceptional Merit in Media Award (EMMA) given by the National Women's Political Caucus. The article was anthologized in the 2004 edition of Best American Crime Writing. In January 2016, Investigation Discovery's Vanity Fair Confidential series featured Bingham in its one-hour program about the rape scandal.

While reporting a story in West Virginia, Bingham, a Kentucky native, witnessed the destructive effects of mountaintop removal coal mining for the first time. Afterwards, she spent several years producing The Last Mountain (directed by Bill Haney), which premiered at the Sundance Film Festival in January 2011, screened in theaters in over 60 American cities, and won the International Documentary Association's Pare Lorentz Award.

== Personal life ==
Bingham has three children with her ex-husband, biographer David Michaelis. She lives in Brooklyn, New York with her husband Joseph Finnerty, a lawyer, who has three children of his own.

== Works ==
=== Nonfiction ===
True events

- Women on the Hill: Challenging the Culture of Congress (1996)
- Class Action: The Landmark Case that Changed Sexual Harassment Law (1999), co-written with Laura Leedy Gansler
- Witness to the Revolution: Radicals, Resisters, Vets, Hippies, and the Year America Lost Its Mind and Found Its Soul (2016)
- The Movement: How Women's Liberation Transformed America 1963–1973. New York: Atria/One Signal Publishers. July 30, 2024. ISBN 9781982144210. OCLC 1428742933.
