= Maria Gunnoe =

American activist from West Virginia

Maria Gunnoe (born 1968) is a native West Virginian who opposes mountaintop removal mining, and is a winner of the Goldman Prize and Wallenberg Medal.

== Early life ==
Maria was born in Boone County, West Virginia, where she continues to reside. She is a Cherokee native. Her family has lived in West Virginia for generations, and she comes from a long line of coal miners.

== Activism ==
Gunnoe became involved in activism in 1997 as a volunteer. She expanded her efforts in the 2000s, when a Chris Cline owned|coal company, Jupiter Coal started a mountaintop removal mine near her home. The mining caused pollution and dangerous flooding near her home, leaving her home nearly washed away. The water near her home was also rendered contaminated. To protect her home, Gunnoe decided that she would start activist work against the coal company and mountaintop mining. She has continued to be active in advocating against mountaintop mining despite receiving both threats and acts of violence, including having her dog shot and killed. She has become an organizer for the Ohio Valley Environmental Coalition and SouthWings, a company that conducts flights to show aerial views and photography of mountaintop mining and mountaintop removal. In 2007, she testified against the Army Corps of Engineers in a suit brought against them by the Ohio Valley Environmental Coalition to stop mountaintop removal. She gathered 20 residents to testify with her. She now serves on the board of the Ohio Valley Environmental Coalition, and advocates to protect the Monongahela National Forest from natural gas extraction.

== Honors and appearances ==
- In 2005, Gunnoe received the Environmental Courage Award from the West Virginia Environmental Council.
- In 2006, Gunnoe received the Callaway Award for her organizing efforts in her southern West Virginia community.
- In 2007, she also received the David Vs. Goliath Award from the Rainforest Action Network.
- In 2009 Gunnoe received the Goldman Environmental Prize, which is the second time an environmentalist has been awarded a Goldman Prize for fighting coal mining operations in West Virginia. In 2003, Julia Bonds won a Goldman for opposing the controversial practice of mountaintop removal in Appalachia.
- In October 2012, Gunnoe received the University of Michigan's Wallenberg Medal, and was the first person to receive the award for environmentalist work.

Gunnoe is featured in the:

- 2008 documentary film Burning the Future: Coal in America,
- the 2007 documentary film Mountain Top Removal, and the
- 2011 documentary film The Last Mountain.

Awards and achievements
Preceded by Aung San Suu Kyi	Wallenberg Medalist; 2012	Succeeded by Nicholas Winton
