= Coal River (book) =

2008 book by Michael Shnayerson

Coal River: How a Few Brave Americans Took on a Powerful Company–and the Federal Government–to Save the Land They Love
- Author: Michael Shnayerson
- Language: English
- Publication date: 2008
- Publication place: United States

Coal River: How a Few Brave Americans Took on a Powerful Company–and the Federal Government–to Save the Land They Love is a 2008 book by Michael Shnayerson.

Coal River is a work of investigative journalism which describes an environmental controversy in southern West Virginia, where coal companies are using mountaintop removal mining. The book argues that towns, communities, and the environment are at risk.

Shnayerson is a contributing editor to Vanity Fair. His other books include The Car That Could: GM's Revolutionary Electric Vehicle and The Killers Within: The Deadly Rise of Drug-Resistant Bacteria.

== See also ==
- List of books about coal mining
