= Appalachian Land Ownership Survey =

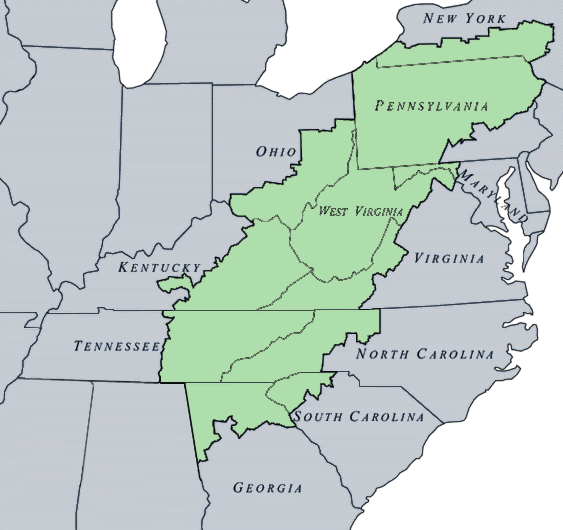
Map of the Appalachian Region

The Appalachian Land Ownership Survey was launched by the Appalachian Land Ownership Task Force in 1978. The survey was created in order to understand the demographics of land ownership within the Appalachian mountain region. This survey spanned the area across 420 different counties from Georgia to Maine. The main focus of the survey was to identify patterns within land ownership, specifically absentee owners and the effects on regional development in the areas. It is mandatory for agricultural land owners in the United States to participate in these surveys to account for their production, financing and inputs within each state.

== Absentee ownership ==
Absentee owners are considered to be private companies within the coal, timber, petroleum industries as well as some National and State parks. Private companies came to the Appalachian mountains to invest in the land with hopes to profit off of the resources. For example, 93 percent of the land owners in West Virginia were absentee owners by the year 1810. As of 1981, absentee owners in the Appalachian mountain regions own a total of 51 percent of the land. In 80 counties throughout Appalachia, these private companies own land in almost half of the surface area; 43 percent of the land is owned by private companies and 8 percent is owned by the Government.

== Natural resource mining ==
The Appalachian region is well known for its abundance of coal, natural gas, and many other natural resources that have led to the extraction of these resources. In the mid-1800s, the demand for coal grew, which caused an abundance of coal companies to set up mine sites throughout the Appalachian Mountains. During this time, the Appalachian region was the top producer of coal for the United States. Up until 1990, Appalachia was producing most of the counties coal with West Virginia, Pennsylvania, and Kentucky being the top production states. West Virginia alone produces nearly half of the regions coal and holds the highest rate of coal employment.

== Taxation system failure ==
Corporations normally have large deductions on their taxes in comparison to the average land owner, so the land under possession of absentee owners is taxed significantly less. Companies mining in the Appalachians take up a large portion of land, which leaves a significantly smaller amount of tax revenue than if the majority was owned by locals. Property taxes are a primary source for government supported projects managing everything from roads and education to welfare. Property values have gone up over 300 percent since 1977, dramatically increasing the cost of property taxes. Due to the low taxes the natural wealth of the area, there is a lack of monetary support for civil services.

== Economic growth ==
The dramatic rise of coal brought many private companies into rural Appalachia. These private companies came to the Appalachia region with hope to invest in and profit from the beautiful, yet valuable resources. Railroad companies, steel mills, textiles factories, and steam boats were the biggest users of coal during the Industrial Revolution.

== Cultural effects ==
In a study done by Dr. David Rouse in 1995, he concluded that the large amount of corporate land ownership in the Appalachians restricted the public access to land, allowed corporations to have more political influence, and decreased civic engagement within the area. Although the Appalachian mountains are filled with an abundance of resources, these areas are often notoriously poor. In 1981 it was found that absentee owners and corporations held up to 43% of the land in the Appalachian mountain region. While these corporations were benefitting from the land, proportionally they were putting very little back into the area in terms of taxes paid. Corporations take up a very large portion of flat land which would be useful to build houses on, and pay a far smaller percentage of tax on that land than the average homeowner would. Many Appalachian Mountain Communities cannot expand their population due to the lack of space to build homes and an inability to create new infrastructure with less tax revenue.
