= Big Coal =

2006 book by Jeff Goodell

Big Coal: The Dirty Secret Behind America's Energy Future
- First edition
- Author: Jeff Goodell
- Language: English
- Genre: Non-fiction
- Publisher: Houghton Mifflin Harcourt
- Publication date: June 8, 2006
- Publication place: United States
- Pages: 352
- ISBN: 978-0-618-31940-4
- Dewey Decimal: 333.793/2 0973 22
- LC Class: TN805.A5 G665 2007

Big Coal: The Dirty Secret Behind America's Energy Future is a book by Jeff Goodell which claims that coal mining is one of America's largest and most influential industries. Goodell suggests that coal mining is deadly and environmentally destructive.

== See also ==
- Burning the Future: Coal in America
- Green Illusions
- List of books about coal mining
- Mountaintop Removal
- Fossil fuel phase-out
