= Julia Bonds =

American environmental activist (1952–2011)

Julia "Judy" Bonds
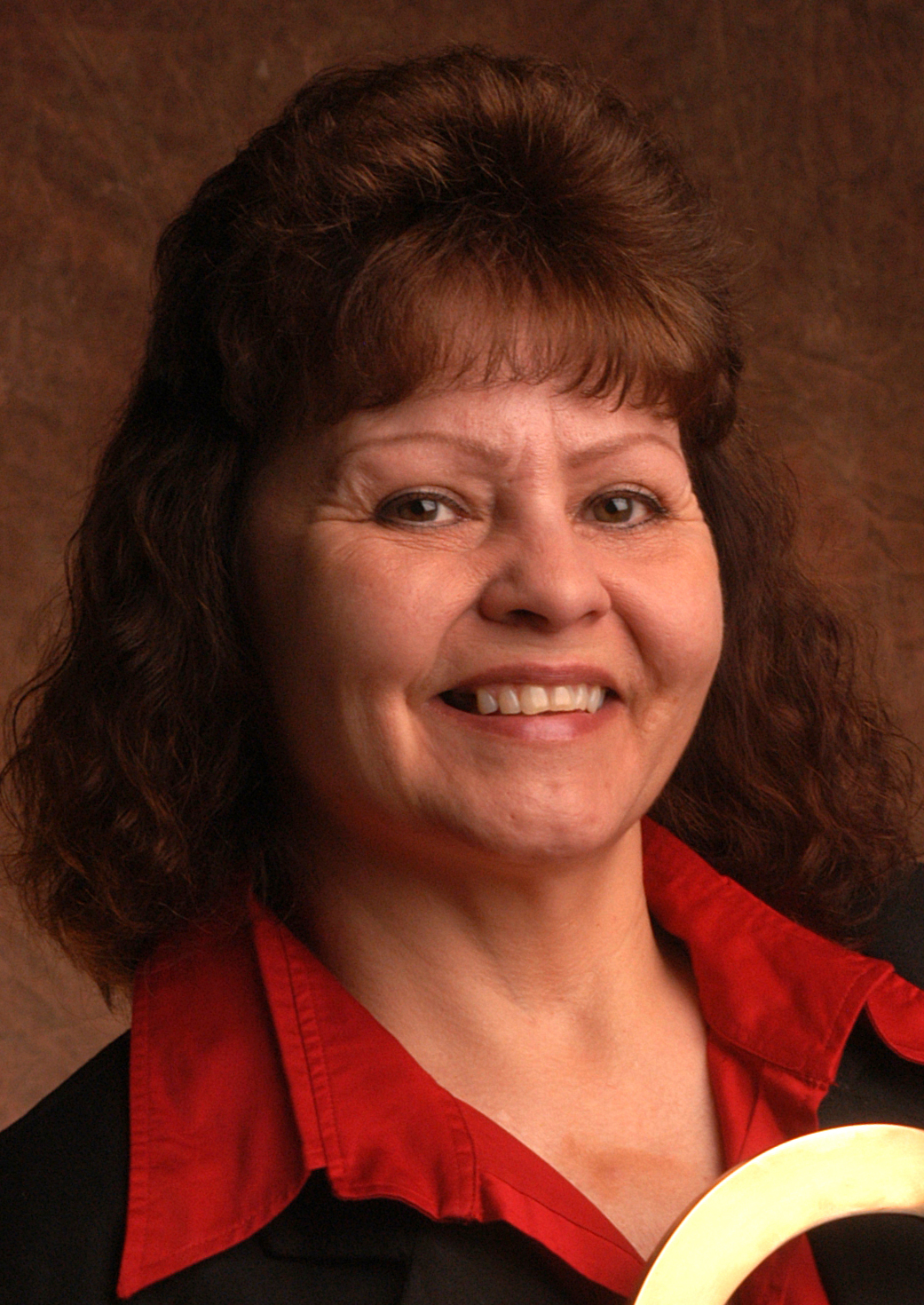
- Julia Bonds, in 2003.
- Born: August 27, 1952; Marfork Hollow, West Virginia
- Died: January 3, 2011 (aged 58); West Virginia
- Occupations: Environmental activist, community leader

Julia "Judy" Belle Thompson Bonds (August 27, 1952 – January 3, 2011) was an organizer and activist from the Appalachian Mountains of West Virginia, United States. Raised in a family of coal miners, she worked from an early age at minimum wage jobs. Bonds was the director of Coal River Mountain Watch (CRMW). She has been called "the godmother of the anti-mountaintop removal movement."

== Environmental activism ==
Much of her organizing activity focused on the role of the mine operator Massey Energy of Richmond, Virginia and the devastation in Coal River Valley's Marfork Hollow as well as other communities in Appalachia. Bonds testified against the company at regulatory hearings, filed lawsuits against surface mining and led protests against Massey. By 2003, she had led the CRMW into a partnership with the United Mine Workers Union to halt mining companies' dangerous use of overweight coal trucks and to convince the state's mining oversight agency to better protect valley communities from mine blasting. In 2009, she brought in actress Daryl Hannah and NASA scientist James Hansen to protest the proximity of a Massey coal slurry dam and storage silo in the vicinity of a West Virginia elementary school. Coal River Mountain Watch, the Sierra Club and other groups filed a lawsuit in April 2010 accusing Massey Energy of violating the U.S. Clean Water Act.

For years, she dreamed of a "thousand hillbilly march" in Washington, DC. In September 2010, that dream became a reality as thousands marched on the White House for "Appalachia Rising"', a mass movement to persuade US Congress to halt to the issuance of valley fill and other types of permits that allow companies to completely remove a mountain top in the search for coal. After sitting in at the offices of the Army Corps of Engineers, blockading the EPA and PNC Bank, an unprecedented number of about 100 protesters were arrested at the White House.

Vernon Haltom, co-director of the Coal River Mountain Watch, wrote about Bond's passion for environmental justice in Appalachia:

Judy endured much personal suffering for her leadership. While people of lesser courage would candy-coat their words or simply shut up and sit down, Judy called it as she saw it. She endured physical assault, verbal abuse, and death threats because she stood up for justice for her community.

Bonds died of cancer on January 3, 2011, at the age of 58.

== Awards ==
She was awarded the Goldman Environmental Prize in 2003, for leading the fight against the mining practice called mountaintop removal mining in the Appalachian mountain range. In an interview after receiving the award, Bonds told how she relies on the teachings of her mother, her religious convictions (from both her Southern Baptist and her Cherokee backgrounds) and from the writings of Martin Luther King Jr. and Mahatma Gandhi:

My sense of justice and outrage came from my mother. ... We are here to steward this land ... I know what I'm doing is right. They can call me whatever they want. I'm not stopping.

== See also ==
- Maria Gunnoe
- Mountaintop removal mining
