= Larry Gibson (environmentalist) =

American environmentalist (1946–2012)

Larry Gibson (1946 – September 9, 2012) was an anti-mining environmentalist from West Virginia, who spent the majority of his adult life opposing mountaintop removal coal mining in the area, specifically at Kayford Mountain. He was president of the Keeper of the Mountains Foundation and lifetime member of the Sierra Club. He also was a board member for the Ohio Valley Environmental Coalition.

== Childhood and early life ==
The Gibson family ancestors have originally lived in the Kayford Mountain area since the 1700s, but when Gibson was a child, his family moved from the home where he was born to an urban town in northern Ohio. His father and grandfather were both coal miners and he had many other relatives who worked in the mines. The family were very poor and moved around the different coal camps of the area. Gibson’s father lost his job while Larry was still studying in fourth grade.

He went on to work in the automobile industry at the young age of 13 for General Motors until an injury forced him into early retirement. He returned to Kayford Mountain shortly afterwards, where he found that mountaintop removal coal mining operations had become so prevalent that one nearly infringed on his family’s cemetery plot. This cemetery plot was eventually desecrated by mining equipment, an act that he stood by to witness in the early 2000s. Living in such a beautiful landscape inspired Gibson at a young age; he once said, “Growing up here was an adventure every day. I played with my pet bobcat, my fox, my hawk. All of these things, the good Lord provided on this land.”

== Activism ==
When Gibson returned to Kayford Mountain in the mid-1980s, mining companies had just started to buy small plots of land from the local communities to dynamite the mountain peaks and dig for coal. The scale of the industry grew annually with great speed and according to current campaigners, 500 mountains across Virginia and Kentucky have been stripped of trees and flattened, and some 1,200 mountain streams have been buried beneath rock and debris. Gibson began his activism by using the area as an exhibition of mountaintop mining and he achieved this by inviting reporters, celebrities, other activists and locals to observe the large-scale digging operations. Gibson also wandered the state educating locals on the mining activities’ effects, having once walked from Harper’s Ferry across southern West Virginia to Huntington on his own, speaking to communities he encountered on the way of his campaign. For decades, Gibson continued his activism, despite being offered millions of dollars by mining companies to leave the area. Building a two-room cabin on the mountain, Gibson pitched himself in for the long-haul while his wife stayed in a nearby town, even persuading his cousins to build similar shacks nearby. He travelled nationally and internationally, speaking to community groups, political rallies, shareholder meetings and government agencies, usually wearing his trademark baseball cap and neon-green T-shirt with the motto “Love them or leave them, just don’t destroy them.” Money was not the only tactic that was employed to stop Gibson; he is only too keen to show visitors bullet holes in the wood of his cabin, the same cabin that was also ransacked at one point. There have also been attempts on his life when his truck was run off the road on a few occasions by coal trucks, at one point with a Washington Post reporter inside. Two of his dogs were killed. He had effigies of him burned, endured threatening phone calls and was beaten up more than once.

Gibson was arrested on numerous occasions and had no fear in doing so; one fellow activist said that she could not count the number of times he was arrested during his campaigns. On more than one occasion, he was arrested at the Capitol Building in Washington whilst protesting with others on the government’s lack of backing for the campaign.

In 2004, Gibson started the Keepers of the Mountain Foundation to raise awareness of his campaign and to inspire others to his cause.

== Recognition ==
There are many environmentalists that say they have drawn inspiration from his character of activism, among them the 350.org founder Bill McKibben, the environmental lawyer Robert F. Kennedy Jr. and the climate scientist James Hansen. CNN recognised Gibson for his efforts and awarded him the CNN Heroes award in 2007. He was also the subject of an ABC documentary in their 20/20 television series.

== Death ==
At the age of 66, Larry Gibson died of a heart attack on 9 September 2012 at his home in West Virginia. Gibson left behind a wife and three children.
