= Burning the Future: Coal in America =

- Directed by: David Novack
- Written by: David Novack; Richard Hankin
- Produced by: Alexis Zoullas; David Novack
- Cinematography: Scott Shelley; Samuel Henriques
- Edited by: Richard Hankin
- Music by: Raz Mesinai
- Release date: 2008
- Running time: 89 minutes 56 minutes (PBS)
- Country: United States
- Language: English

Burning the Future: Coal in America is a 2008 documentary film produced and directed by David Novack. The film focuses on the impacts of mountaintop mining in the Appalachians, where mountain ridges are scraped away by heavy machinery to access coal seams below, a process that is cheaper and faster than traditional mining methods but is damaging to the environment. Some environmental problems discussed in the film include disfigured mountain ranges, extinct plant and animal species, toxic groundwater, and increased flooding. The film's run time is 89 minutes. In 2012, it was rereleased in a shorter, updated version, that was created for public broadcast on PBS. This new version of the film's run time is 56 minutes.

The executive producer of the film is CJ Follini, founder and CEO of the former Gun For Hire Production Studios.

== Synopsis ==
The mountaintop removal site at Kayford Mountain, West Virginia.

This documentary concerns the coal industry's use of mountaintop removal coal mining in West Virginia and the direct impact of this practice on West Virginia residents. The film particularly focuses on South West Virginia resident, Maria Gunnoe, an activist for the protection of her home state and its residents. In 2003, Gunnoe's property, bridges, and five acres of land were destroyed within two hours of rainfall by a large flood, caused by the coal industry's elimination of about 1.4 million acres of mountains. Gunnoe had lived on her same property for 37 years, and her family for generations before that. In the film, Wheeling Jesuit University ecologist, Ben Stout, asserts that the water used by West Virginia residents is not usable or consumable due to the dumping of excess mining spoil by the coal industry, and that the consumption of this water will cause people to become sick and even has the possibility to eventually cause death. Roger Lilly of Walker Machinery is featured in the film and makes the claim that the miners take great pride in making sure that they leave a “very small and gentle footprint on the scenic beauty in West Virginia”. As well, a clip from a speech by George W. Bush is shown, where he is advocating for the discovery and use of coal in “our own hemisphere” in the interest of our national security. Other interview subjects include trial lawyer for public justice, Jim Hecker, who describes the frustration of activists and environmentalists with the Bush administration's protection of the coal industry every time something was found to be illegal or wrong with their practices. According to Hecker, the Bush administration would change the law instead of enforcing it, so that the coal industry could continue doing what they were doing regardless of the potential residential or environmental impact.

The documentary reports that 36% of the United States' global warming emissions and over half of the United States’ electricity is generated by coal-burning plants. The film features footage of the floods that destroyed the property of West Virginia residents as well as the contaminated tap water in their homes.

== DVD release ==
The DVD version of the film was released in 2008 and includes special features that explore some of the topics that are touched on during the film more in depth. These extras include short films on Coal and Energy, Coal and Climate Change, Pollution and Public Healthy, and Democracy and Action. There is also a Coal Impact Guide, that details coal's effects on the environment, and by extension global warming, as well as people's health. It also discusses how people can make a difference in their daily lives in relation to coal and the use of the energy it creates.

== Television release ==
On May 13, 2008 Burning the Future: Coal in America made its premiere on National Television on The Sundance Channel. It was played as part of the second season of “The Green” series, which was a series of eco-focused films, shorts, and other forms of media. It was played three times during the week, as well as during re-run seasons of “The Green”. In 2012, An updated, shorter version, which was 56 minutes long, was created for broadcast on PBS. It aired on select PBS stations in the months of April and May. It was also available to be viewed online during Earth Day weekend, April 21–22, 2012 for people who signed up on the website of the film, Burning the Future: Coal in America.

== Reception ==
The film finished production in 2008 and garnered mostly positive reviews from critics, with Matt Zoller Seitz from the New York Times boldly stating that the film was “as upsetting as it was informative.” Pam Solo, the Founder and President of the Civil Society Institute, stated that “this moving and disturbing story adds the human element to a sanitized political debate. Burning the Future just might help us move politicians to solve global warming and our country's energy needs through clean power now.” IMDb rated the film a 7.7 out of 10, and also provided a collection of well received critic reviews including Mr. Seitz's. The positive critic consensus is indicative of the film's overall motive and purpose to preserve the natural environment. Burning the Future: Coal in America, the film's main webpage, has kept tabs on the events that have come in the wake of the documentary that have been supplemental to the preservation of the natural environment. The last update was posted on November 15, 2012, to announce that Patriot Coal, one of Appalachia's biggest coal companies, was getting out of the mountaintop removal business. Their agreement to quit the practice of large-scale surface mining in Appalachia is an acknowledgement of the risks that surface mining possess, such as increased risk for heart disease, birth defects, water and air pollution, and a pledge to discontinue the destroyal of area mountains.

== Screenings ==
- AFI/Dallas International Film Festival - April 2008
- West Virginia FILMmakers’ Festival - April 2008
- West Virginia International Film Festival - April 2008
- International Wildlife Film Festival - May 2008
- Tallahassee Filmmakers’ Festival - May 2008
- Indie Gathering International Film Festival - August 2008
- Colorado Environmental Film Festival - October 2008
- EcoFocus Film Festival - October 2008
- Mill Valley International Film Festival - October 2008
- Montana Cine International Film Festival - October 2008
- American Conservation Film Festival - November 2008
- Ojai Film Festival - November 2008
- Southern Appalachian International Film Festival - November 2008
- St. LouCine-strat International Film Festival, Spain
- is International Film Festival - November 2008
- International Documentary Association (IDA) DocuFest - December 2008
- Princeton Environmental Film Festival - January 2009
- Wild & Scenic Film Festival - November 2009
- Berkshire International Film Festival - January 2011
- Moondance International Film Festival
- Rooftops Film Festival/Solar 1 Film Festival

== Awards ==
- Won - International Documentary Association (IDA) DocuFest, Pare Lorentz Award and Best Social Documentary of 2008
- Won - Society of Environmental Journalists, Best in-depth Television Reporting on the Environment
- Won - International Visual Communications Association, London; Clarion Award Winner for Communication of Diversity, Sustainable Development and Ethical Debate
- Won - Montana Cine International Film Festival; Best of Festival, Golden Cine Award, Best Theatrically Released Film, Best Independent Production, Best Human-Nature Interaction
- Won - West Virginia FILMmakers’ Festival - Official Selection; Best Film of 2008
- Won - Tallahassee Filmmakers’ Festival; Best Documentary
- Honorary Mention - International Wildlife Film Festival - Official Selection; Depiction of Community Activism, Depiction of Timely Conservation Issue
- Won - Indie Gathering International Film Festival - Official Selection; Bronze Award for Documentary Features
- Finalist - Moondance International Film Festival

== See also ==
- Big Coal: The Dirty Secret Behind America's Energy Future (book)
- Mountain Top Removal (film)
- Environmental issues in the United States
- Fossil-fuel phase-out
