= RECLAIM Act =

The RECLAIM Act (Revitalizing the Economy of Coal Communities by Leveraging Local Activities and Investing More Act) was simultaneously introduced in the U.S. Senate and U.S. House of Representatives on 27 March 2017 by Senator Mitch McConnell (R-KY) and Representative Hal Rogers (R-KY-5). The bill authorizes the use of funds generated by Surface Mining Control and Reclamation Act of 1977 (SMCRA) to be invested in communities adversely affected by the cessation of mining operations in the area.

A revised version was introduced April 30, 2019 as S. 1232 by Senator Manchin (D-WV) and on April 9, 2019 as H.R. 2156 by Representative Cartwright (D-PA).

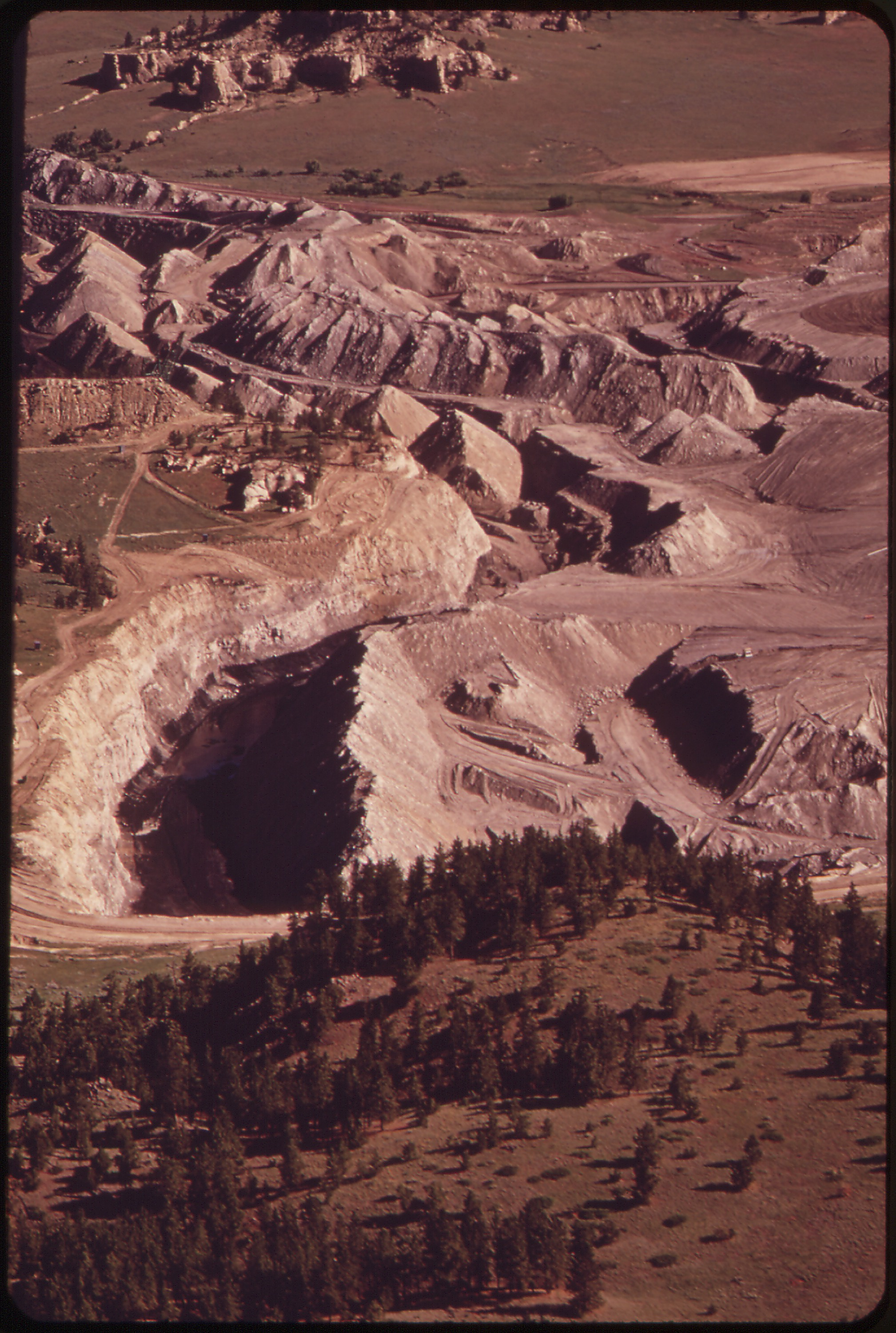
PEABODY COAL COMPANY STRIP MINE, SOUTH OF COLSTRIP - NARA - 549167

== Background ==
The RECLAIM Act was preceded by and amends the SMCRA, which was enacted in 1977 to decrease the amount of coal dust in downstream water resources and other mining operations that are harmful to wildlife. Shortly after SMCRA was established, the United States Department of Interior created the Office of Surface Mining Reclamation and Enforcement (OSMRE) agency to enforce the law. OSMRE's purview includes protecting wildlife, restoring abandoned mines, and making sure the regulations for surface coal mining are complied with.

In addition, the agency has been charged with the administration of Abandoned Mine Land (AML) Reclamation Fund. Under the RECLAIM Act, extra AML funds will be disbursed over the next five years, giving up to $1 billion to help clean up and restore abandoned mines and foster economic development.

== Provisions ==
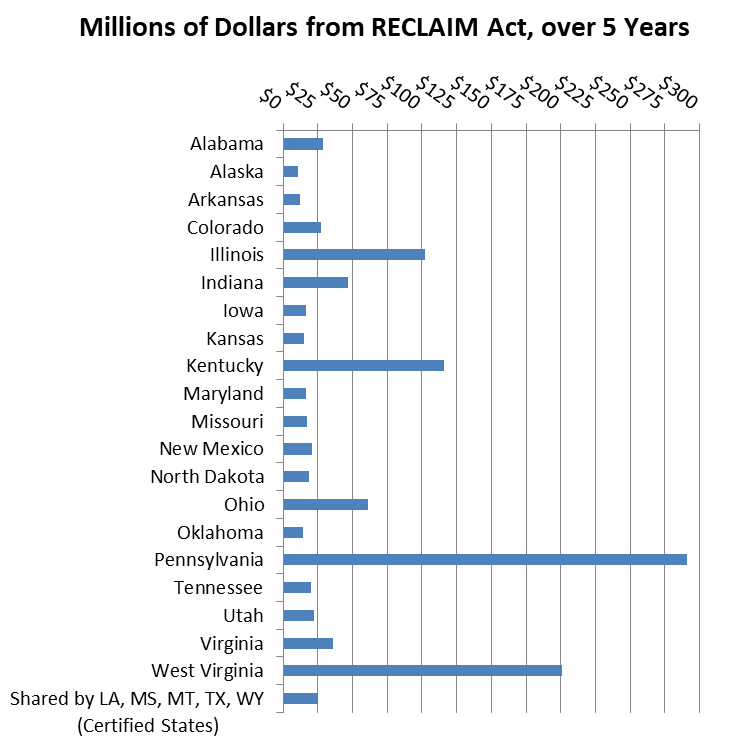
RECLAIM Act spending by state

Section 416 amends the SMCRA by adding a section at the end of the bill that appropriates $200,000,000 for five fiscal years. This money is to be used by U.S. states and Indian tribes to "promote economic revitalization, diversification, and development in economically distressed mining communities through the reclamation and restoration of land and water resources adversely affected by coal mining carried out before August 3, 1977." The appropriated funds can only be used for certain priority projects. The project must meet the requirements of sections 403(a) (of 30 USC 1233) and 416(c) of the RECLAIM Act. Section 416(c) states that upon completion of the project, the reclamation should have created conditions for favorable development or conditions for the general welfare through development of communities. This section of the bill, the appropriations section, states that 30 percent of funds can be used for acid mine drainage treatment, 10 percent for project planning and administration and no more than 50 percent can be used for abandoned mine lands reclamation and restoration.

The money is divided among states by a formula, with 80% weight on the amount of coal mined from each State or Indian tribe before August 3, 1977, and 20% weight on reclamation fees paid from 2012 through 2016. The RECLAIM Act's stated goal is to help "economically distressed mining communities... adversely affected by coal mining carried out before August 3, 1977," and much of the targeted support goes to Kentucky, Illinois, Pennsylvania and West Virginia.

== Legislative history ==
Congress	Short title	Bill number(s)	Date introduced	Sponsor(s)	# of cosponsors	Latest status
114th Congress	RECLAIM Act of 2016	H.R. 4456	February 3, 2016	Hal Rogers (R-KY)	27	Died in committee
114th Congress	RECLAIM Act of 2016	S. 3532	December 8, 2016	Joe Manchin (D-WV)	4	Died in committee
115th Congress	RECLAIM Act of 2017	H.R. 1731	March 27, 2017	Hal Rogers (R-KY)	40	Died in committee
115th Congress	RECLAIM Act of 2017	S. 728	March 27, 2017	Mitch McConnell (R-KY)	1	Died in committee
115th Congress	RECLAIM Act of 2017	S. 738	March 27, 2017	Joe Manchin (D-WV)	5	Died in committee
116th Congress	RECLAIM Act of 2019	S. 1232	April 30, 2019	Joe Manchin (D-WV)	6	Died in committee
116th Congress	RECLAIM Act of 2019	H.R. 2156	April 9, 2019	Matt Cartwright (D-PA)	65	Died in committee
117th Congress	RECLAIM Act of 2021	H.R. 1733	March 10, 2021	Matt Cartwright (D-PA)	57	Referred to committee
117th Congress	RECLAIM Act of 2021	S. 1455	April 29, 2021	Joe Manchin (D-WV)	4	Referred to committee

== Reactions ==
The bill has generated support from a broad coalition of interest groups, such as Appalachian grassroots organizations, religious organizations, and environmentalist groups. The organizations argue that the bill will revitalize the economies of communities that were traditionally reliant upon coal mining. Polling in Eastern Kentucky suggests that Appalachian support for the bill is not limited to lobbying groups, approximately 89% of voters support this bill.

Industry groups have lobbied against the bill, arguing that the Abandoned Mines Lands (AML) funds should not be diverted from their original purpose. The National Mining Association has stated broader opposition to the administration of AML funds.

The Heritage Foundation argues it is a poor use of money, deregulation would be better, and the AML fees should be allowed to expire at the end of 2021.
