= Solar power in Virginia =

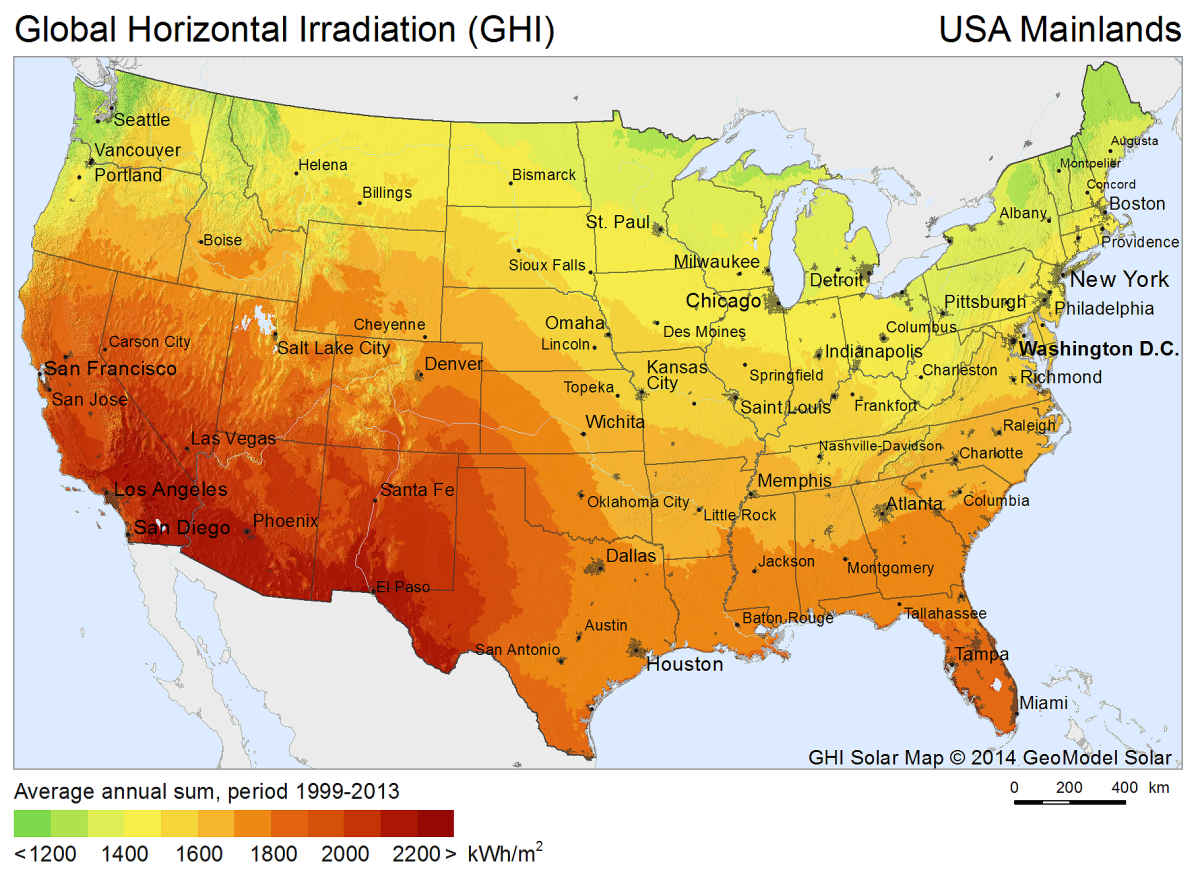
U.S. solar potential

Solar power in Virginia on rooftops is estimated to be capable of providing 32.4% of electricity used in Virginia using 28,500 MW of solar panels. Installing solar panels provides a 6.8% return on investment in Virginia, and a 5 kW array would return a profit of $16,041 over its 25 year life.

A feed-in tariff is available from the Tennessee Valley Authority, which pays $1,000 for signing up, plus the current rate for electricity plus $0.12/kWh for all generation. Systems are limited to from 0.5 kW to 50 kW. Payment is for 10 years. Payments are in the form of monthly credits to the consumers regular monthly bill and are paid monthly or annually at TVA's choice. Payments are for 10 years, and payment at retail can be extended for an additional 10 years. A standard offer program is available for systems from 50 kW to 1 MW, which pays from 4 to 6 cents/kWh above retail for the first 10 years. Net metering is available.

Virginia's largest solar array in 2014 was the 504 kW rooftop array located in Woodbridge.

Amazon has partnered with Dominion Virginia Power to construct the largest solar facility in the Mid-Atlantic in Accomack County on Virginia’s Eastern Shore. Amazon Solar Farm US East is an 80 MW facility developed by a solar energy company and purchased by Dominion.

The Virginia Clean Economy Act of 2020 directs the construction of 16,100 MW of solar power and onshore wind by 2035, bringing the state's utility-delivered power to 100% renewable energy by 2045.

The Spotsylvania Solar project is the largest in the state, with four phases completed in 2020 and 2021 totaling 617 MWdc capacity.

== Currently operating (Note: As of December 31, 2025) ==
=== Appalachian Plateau Region ===
Solar Facilities in Virginia (Appalachian Plateau Region)
#	Plant Name	Utility Name	County	Capacity (MW)	Operating Year
1	Mineral Gap	Madison Energy Investments LLC	Wise	3.0	2023

=== Blue Ridge Mountains Region ===
Solar Facilities in Virginia (Blue Ridge Mountains Region)
#	Plant Name	Utility Name	County	Capacity (MW)	Operating Year
1	Caden Energix Wytheville LLC	Caden Energix Wytheville LLC	Wythe	20.0	2022
2	River Trail Solar, LLC	River Trail Solar, LLC	Carroll	20.0	2025
3	Wythe County Solar	RWE Clean Energy	Wythe	75.0	2025

=== Coastal Plain / Tidewater Region ===
Solar Facilities in Virginia (Coastal Plain / Tidewater Region)
#	Plant Name	Utility Name	County	Capacity (MW)	Operating Year
1	Bedford Solar (Dominion)	Dominion Renewable Energy	Chesapeake City	70.0	2021
2	Bookers Mill Solar	Dominion Energy Inc.	Richmond	127.0	2024
3	Briel Solar Farm	Briel Solar Farm, LLC	Henrico	20.0	2021
4	Cherry Valley Solar	SunEnergy1	Prince George	150.0	2022
5	Colonial Solar	Dominion Energy Inc.	Essex	88.0	2023
6	Cool Spring Solar	Dominion Energy Inc.	Surry	19.5	2020
7	Fiddlers Green Solar	Dominion Energy Inc.	Isle of Wight	15.0	2020
8	Foxhound Solar	Dominion Energy Inc.	Halifax	150.0	2024
9	Grassfield Solar	Dominion Energy Inc.	Chesapeake City	20.0	2020
10	Green Ridge Solar	Dominion Energy Inc.	Accomack	49.0	2017
11	Greensville County Solar	Dominion Energy Inc.	Greensville	80.0	2022
12	Grove Solar Farm	SunEnergy1	James City	20.0	2022
13	Herndon Solar	SolRiver Capital LLC	Isle of Wight	5.0	2024
14	Hickory Solar	Dominion Energy Inc.	Chesapeake City	20.0	2020
15	Hilton Farm Solar	Dominion Energy Inc.	Newport News City	20.0	2020
16	Lafayette Solar	Dominion Energy Inc.	Chesapeake City	15.0	2020
17	Lawns Solar	Dominion Energy Inc.	Chesapeake City	20.0	2020
18	Liberty Solar Farm	Dominion Energy Inc.	Isle of Wight	20.0	2020
19	Locust Hill Solar	Dominion Energy Inc.	Westmoreland	80.0	2022
20	Lynnhaven Solar	Dominion Energy Inc.	Virginia Beach City	20.0	2020
21	Magnolia Solar	Dominion Energy Inc.	Suffolk City	20.0	2020
22	Maplewood Solar	Dominion Energy Inc.	Pittsylvania	19.5	2020
23	Meadow Brook Solar	Dominion Energy Inc.	Suffolk City	20.0	2020
24	Moore's Creek Solar	Dominion Energy Inc.	Suffolk City	19.5	2020
25	Mountain View Solar	Dominion Energy Inc.	Suffolk City	20.0	2020
26	Nansemond Solar	Dominion Energy Inc.	Suffolk City	20.0	2020
27	Northampton Solar	Dominion Energy Inc.	Northampton	80.0	2022
28	Oceana Solar	Dominion Energy Inc.	Virginia Beach City	15.0	2020
29	Oyster Point Solar	Dominion Energy Inc.	Newport News City	20.0	2020
30	Pamunkey Solar	Dominion Energy Inc.	New Kent	20.0	2020
31	Paw Paw Solar	Dominion Energy Inc.	Sussex	19.5	2020
32	Possum Point Solar	Dominion Energy Inc.	Prince William	20.0	2020
33	Powell Creek Solar	Dominion Energy Inc.	Prince George	19.5	2020
34	Princess Anne Solar	Dominion Energy Inc.	Virginia Beach City	15.0	2020
35	Red Oak Solar	Dominion Energy Inc.	Surry	20.0	2020
36	Remington Solar	Dominion Energy Inc.	Fauquier	19.5	2020
37	Sabot Solar	Dominion Energy Inc.	Goochland	20.0	2020
38	Sawmill Solar	Dominion Energy Inc.	Isle of Wight	20.0	2020
39	Scott Solar	Dominion Energy Inc.	Powhatan	19.5	2020
40	SEMCORP Solar	SEMCORP	Isle of Wight	5.0	2023
41	Southampton Solar	Dominion Energy Inc.	Southampton	100.0	2016
42	Suffolk Solar	Dominion Energy Inc.	Suffolk City	20.0	2020
43	Sunfield Solar	Dominion Energy Inc.	Isle of Wight	20.0	2020
44	Sycamore Solar	Dominion Energy Inc.	Pittsylvania	20.0	2020
45	Tall Pines Solar	Dominion Energy Inc.	Isle of Wight	20.0	2020
46	Thoroughgood Solar	Dominion Energy Inc.	Virginia Beach City	15.0	2020
47	Tidewater Solar	Dominion Energy Inc.	Isle of Wight	20.0	2020
48	Turner Solar	Dominion Energy Inc.	Isle of Wight	20.0	2020
49	Walnut Solar	Dominion Energy Inc.	Suffolk City	20.0	2020
50	Westmoreland Solar	Dominion Energy Inc.	Westmoreland	80.0	2022
51	White Oak Solar	Dominion Energy Inc.	Henrico	20.0	2020
52	Windsor Solar	Dominion Energy Inc.	Isle of Wight	20.0	2020
53	Woodland Solar	Dominion Energy Inc.	Isle of Wight	20.0	2020
54	Wythe Creek Solar	Dominion Energy Inc.	Hampton City	20.0	2020
55	Yawbama Solar	Dominion Energy Inc.	King William	20.0	2020

=== Piedmont Region ===
Solar Facilities in Virginia (Piedmont Region)
#	Plant Name	Utility Name	County	Capacity (MW)	Operating Year
1	Altavista Solar	Altavista Solar, LLC	Campbell	80.0	2021
2	Alton Post Office Solar	Urban Grid Solar	Halifax	75.0	2024
3	Amherst Solar Facility (VA)	Appalachian Power Co	Amherst	4.9	2023
4	Appomattox Solar	Dominion Energy Inc.	Appomattox	80.0	2023
5	Ardsley Solar	Dominion Energy Inc.	Halifax	120.0	2024
6	Barker Solar	Dominion Energy Inc.	Halifax	74.9	2022
7	Bear Garden Solar	Dominion Energy Inc.	Buckingham	19.5	2020
8	Belspring Solar	Dominion Energy Inc.	Pulaski	15.0	2020
9	Birdseye Solar	Dominion Energy Inc.	Halifax	20.0	2020
10	Boykins Solar	Dominion Energy Inc.	Southampton	20.0	2020
11	Branchville Solar	Dominion Energy Inc.	Southampton	20.0	2020
12	Bren Road Solar	Dominion Energy Inc.	Prince William	19.5	2020
13	Broadfield Solar	Dominion Energy Inc.	Dinwiddie	15.0	2020
14	Brookneal Solar	Dominion Energy Inc.	Campbell	80.0	2021
15	Burton Station Solar	Dominion Energy Inc.	Virginia Beach City	20.0	2020
16	Caroline Solar	Dominion Energy Inc.	Caroline	75.0	2021
17	Carters Creek Solar	Dominion Energy Inc.	Lancaster	20.0	2020
18	Cavalier Solar	Dominion Energy Inc.	Mecklenburg	80.0	2024
19	Charlotte Solar	Dominion Energy Inc.	Charlotte	80.0	2022
20	Chase City Solar	Dominion Energy Inc.	Mecklenburg	20.0	2020
21	Chippokes Solar	Dominion Energy Inc.	Surry	20.0	2020
22	Christian Creek Solar	Dominion Energy Inc.	Augusta	20.0	2020
23	Clay Street Solar	Dominion Energy Inc.	Chesapeake City	20.0	2020
24	Coleman Solar	Dominion Energy Inc.	Halifax	20.0	2020
25	Commonwealth Solar	Dominion Energy Inc.	Accomack	75.0	2021
26	CPV Fairview Solar	CPV Fairview	Halifax	120.0	2024
27	Daybreak Solar	Dominion Energy Inc.	Halifax	20.0	2020
28	Dixon Solar	Dominion Energy Inc.	Halifax	20.0	2020
29	Double Bridge Solar	Dominion Energy Inc.	Lunenburg	80.0	2023
30	Dr. H.R. Wilkin Solar	Dominion Energy Inc.	Shenandoah	20.0	2020
31	Drewryville Solar	Dominion Energy Inc.	Southampton	20.0	2020
32	Elk Creek Solar	Dominion Energy Inc.	Brunswick	15.0	2020
33	Emporia Solar	Dominion Energy Inc.	Greensville	20.0	2020
34	Essex Solar	Dominion Energy Inc.	Essex	20.0	2020
35	Fairystone Solar	Dominion Energy Inc.	Henry	80.0	2022
36	Farmville Solar	Dominion Energy Inc.	Prince Edward	20.0	2020
37	Finney Solar	Dominion Energy Inc.	Russell	15.0	2020
38	Flat Ridge Solar	Dominion Energy Inc.	Grayson	15.0	2020
39	Fluvanna Solar	Dominion Energy Inc.	Fluvanna	20.0	2020
40	Gills Creek Solar	Dominion Energy Inc.	Franklin	20.0	2020
41	Glover Solar	Dominion Energy Inc.	Dinwiddie	20.0	2020
42	Goochland Solar	Dominion Energy Inc.	Goochland	20.0	2020
43	Great Plains Solar	Dominion Energy Inc.	Roanoke	15.0	2020
44	Halifax Solar	Dominion Energy Inc.	Halifax	80.0	2023
45	Happy Creek Solar	Dominion Energy Inc.	Warren	19.5	2020
46	Harmony Village Solar	Dominion Energy Inc.	Middlesex	20.0	2020
47	Harrison Solar	Dominion Energy Inc.	Brunswick	20.0	2020
48	Haywood Solar	Dominion Energy Inc.	Henry	19.5	2020
49	Healing Springs Solar	Dominion Energy Inc.	Bath	15.0	2020
50	Henry Solar	Dominion Energy Inc.	Henry	20.0	2020
51	Holley Solar	Dominion Energy Inc.	Southampton	20.0	2020
52	Iron Station Solar	Dominion Energy Inc.	Lincoln	20.0	2020
53	Jamestown Solar	Dominion Energy Inc.	James City	20.0	2020
54	Jerusalem Solar	Dominion Energy Inc.	Southampton	20.0	2020
55	Lee Solar	Dominion Energy Inc.	Lee	15.0	2020
56	Liberty University Solar	Liberty University	Campbell	1.1	2017
57	Lightfoot Solar	Dominion Energy Inc.	James City	15.0	2020
58	Little Creek Solar	Dominion Energy Inc.	Pulaski	15.0	2020
59	Louisa Solar	Dominion Energy Inc.	Louisa	150.0	2023
60	Mecklenburg Solar	Dominion Energy Inc.	Mecklenburg	80.0	2022
61	Mid-Atlantic Solar	Dominion Energy Inc.	Westmoreland	20.0	2020
62	Moody Solar	Dominion Energy Inc.	Mecklenburg	20.0	2020
63	Moore Solar	Dominion Energy Inc.	Halifax	20.0	2020
64	Remington Solar II	Dominion Energy Inc.	Fauquier	20.0	2020
65	Scottsville Solar	Dominion Energy Inc.	Albemarle	20.0	2020
66	Spotsylvania Solar Energy Project	First Solar Inc.	Spotsylvania	613.0	2021
67	St. Brides Solar	Dominion Energy Inc.	Chesapeake City	20.0	2020
68	St. Tammany Solar	Dominion Energy Inc.	Mecklenburg	80.0	2023
69	Stone Spring Solar	Dominion Energy Inc.	Rockingham	19.5	2020
70	West River Solar	Dominion Energy Inc.	Giles	15.0	2020

=== Valley and Ridge Region ===
Solar Facilities in Virginia (Valley and Ridge Region)
#	Plant Name	Utility Name	County	Capacity (MW)	Operating Year
1	Augusta CSG, LLC	Dimension Energy LLC	Augusta	2.9	2024
2	Bartonsville Energy Facility, LLC	Bartonsville Energy Facility, LLC	Frederick	130.0	2024
3	Caden Energix Endless Caverns, LLC	Caden Energix Endless Caverns, LLC	Rockingham	31.4	2023
4	Clarke County Solar	Dominion Energy Inc.	Clarke	20.0	2020
5	Cool Spring Solar (V&R)	Dominion Energy Inc.	Washington	15.0	2020
6	Daleville Solar	Dominion Energy Inc.	Botetourt	15.0	2020
7	Ironwood Solar	Dominion Energy Inc.	Franklin	15.0	2020
8	Middle River Solar	Dominion Energy Inc.	Augusta	20.0	2020
9	Mountain Valley Solar	Dominion Energy Inc.	Giles	15.0	2020
10	New Market Solar	Dominion Energy Inc.	Shenandoah	15.0	2020
11	North River Solar	Dominion Energy Inc.	Augusta	20.0	2020
12	Oak Level Solar	Dominion Energy Inc.	Henry	20.0	2020
13	Riverdale Solar	Dominion Energy Inc.	Halifax	20.0	2020
14	Shenandoah Solar	Dominion Energy Inc.	Page	20.0	2020

== Data Sets ==
Source: NREL

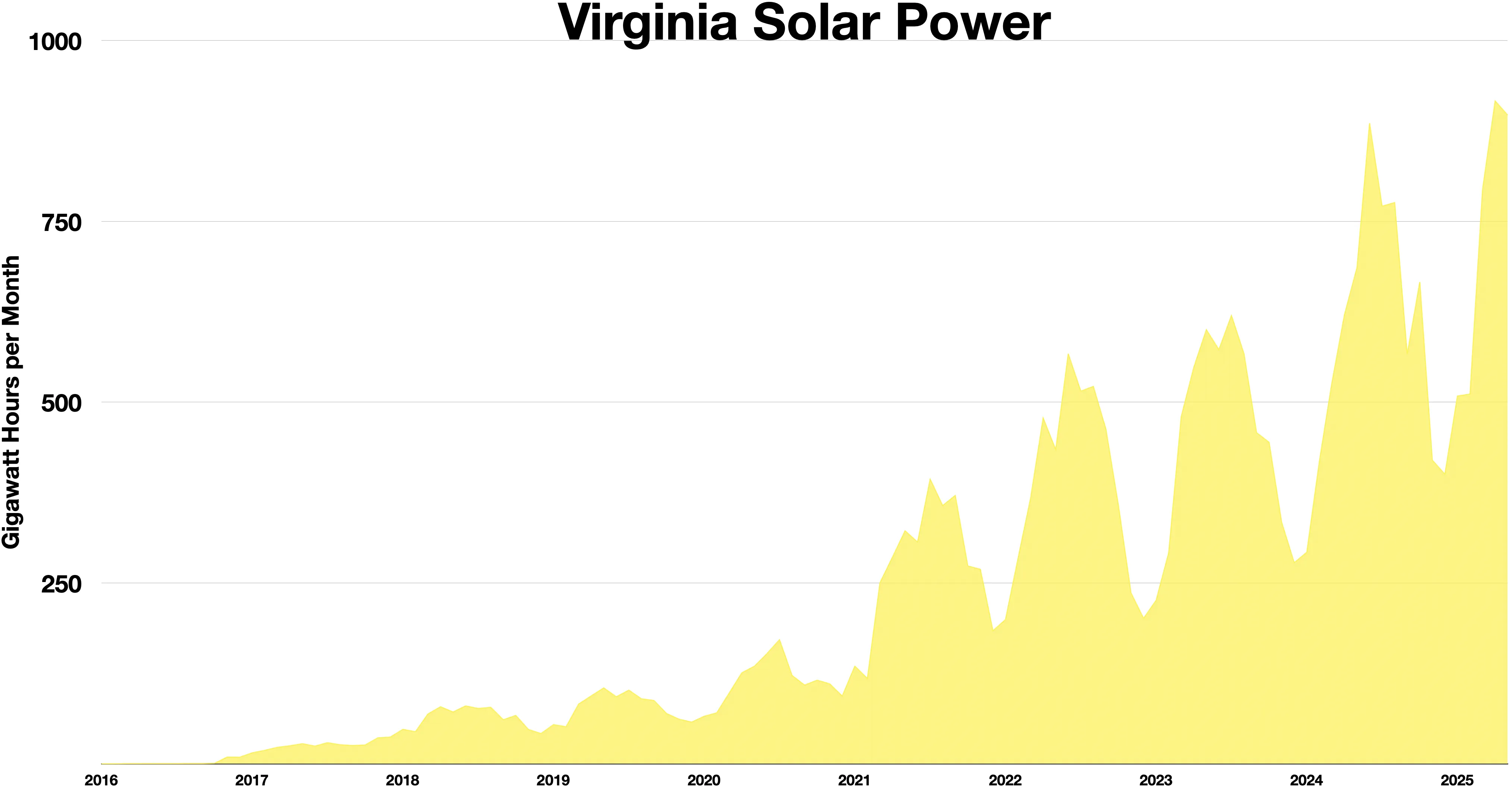
Virginia solar power

Grid-connected PV capacity (MW)
Year	Capacity	Installed	% change
2007	0.4		
2008	0.4		
2009	0.7	0.3	75%
2010	2.6	1.9	271%
2011	4.5	1.8	73%
2012	10.5	5.2	116%
2013	12.6	2.2	21%
2014	11	6	120%
2015	21	10	91%
2016	217	196	933%
2017	613	396	126%
2018	758	145	23%
2019	898	140	18%
2020	2,310.5	1,412.5	157%
2021	3,760.9	1,450.4	%
2022	4,286	525.1	%

Utility-scale solar generation in Virginia (GWh)
Year	Total	Jan	Feb	Mar	Apr	May	Jun	Jul	Aug	Sep	Oct	Nov	Dec
2016	19	0	0	0	0	0	0	0	0	0	1	9	9
2017	313	15	19	23	25	28	24	29	26	25	26	36	37
2018	764	48	44	69	79	72	80	77	78	61	67	47	42
2019	950	54	51	83	94	105	93	102	90	88	70	62	58
2020	1,482	70	79	101	128	146	156	174	138	123	126	117	124
2021	2,200	137	130	248	278	313	317	371	406				

== Gallery ==
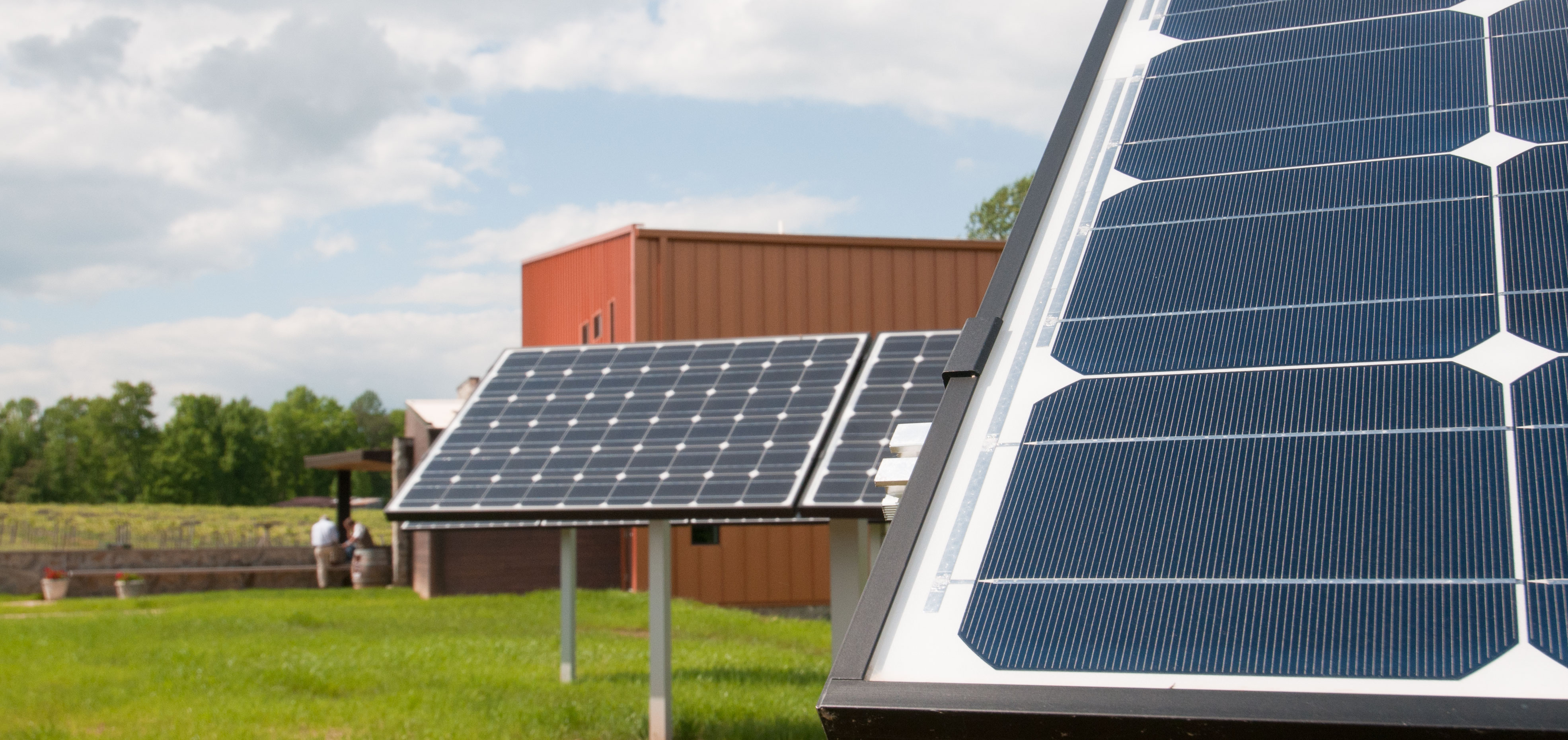
Solar panels at a vineyard in Louisa

== See also ==
- Wind power in Virginia
- List of power stations in Virginia
- Solar power in the United States
- Renewable energy in the United States
