= Virginia City Hybrid Energy Center =

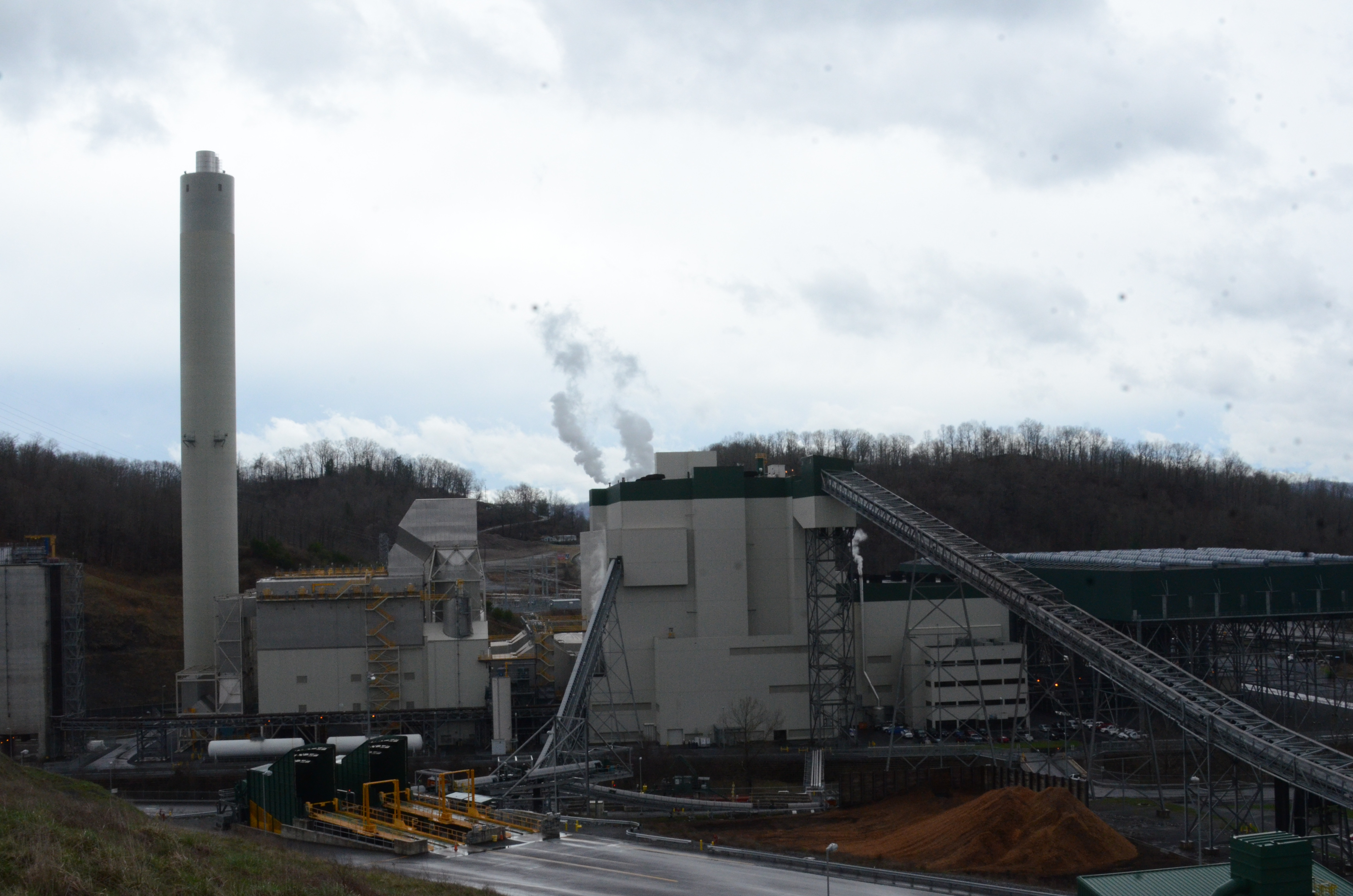
- Exterior view of the Virginia City Hybrid Energy Center showing coal transportation belt, fuel mixing, and smokestack
- Country: United States
- Location: Wise County, near St. Paul, Virginia
- Coordinates: 36°54′55″N 82°20′23″W
- Status: Operational
- Commission date: 2012
- Owner: Dominion Virginia Power
- Operator: Dominion Virginia Power

Thermal power station
- Primary fuel: Coal; Biomass
- Cooling source: Clinch River

Power generation
- Nameplate capacity: 600 MW

The Virginia City Hybrid Energy Center (VCHEC) is a power station located in St. Paul, in Wise County, Virginia. It is operated by Dominion Virginia Power, Dominion Resources Inc.'s electric distribution company in Virginia. The 600 MW plant began power generation in July 2012 after four years of construction. The plant deploys circulating fluidized bed boiler technology (CFB) to use a variety of fuel sources including bituminous coal, coal gob (a waste product from abandoned coal mines), and bio-fuels. VCHEC is placed under stringent environmental regulations by the Virginia Department of Environmental Quality (DEQ).

The plant is required to close by 2045 under the Virginia Clean Economy Act of 2020, though market forces will limit how much it actually operates to a capacity factor of below 20% and may close early.

== History ==
The cost for construction was around $1.8 billion USD, and the plant uses diverse fuel sources to produce energy, (making it unique compared to other energy plants). This generation facility uses coal as well as waste coal (which are called gob piles) in order to produce energy. Biomass can also be used for up to 20% of the fuel burned in the plant to create energy; as of November 2019, biomass accounted for 7% of input fuel. The plant had some challenges during construction which had to be overcome. It was difficult for the builders of the plant to find places where the coal and wood could be stored because the plant was built in a mountainous region. The mountains did not allow for much expansion, so they decided to build the coal storage areas higher than the plant so that gravity would allow the coal to work its way down to the plant to be burned for energy. During February 2012, very close to the end of construction, there was a fire on the roof of the building that contained the boilers. It damaged many circuits and part of the roof, but was only a minor setback for the construction of the plant and the schedule was only delayed by one week. The Virginia City Hybrid Energy Plant has an excellent track record for safety. It was discovered that in 5 million hours of working the plant, there were no accidents that resulted in a loss of time. The plant began generating electric power in July 2012, and has provided jobs around the area of St. Paul, Virginia.

== Production ==
Dominion’s Virginia City Hybrid Energy Center produces electricity by burning coal and coal gob. Due to the mountainous region, the storage of fuel is set around the plant in higher elevation areas to minimize the work necessary to move it and to take advantage of the space available. Both the coal and biomass fuels are stored in quantities for ten days of operation. The fuel is then processed and moved to the two Foster Wheeler fuel-flexible CFB boilers to power a single 668-MW Toshiba steam turbine. The air quality control equipment includes a dry scrubber, baghouse particulate filter, selective catalytic reduction system (SCR), and activated carbon injection system(mercury). According to industry publications, VCHEC also improves upon water use and reuse, using about one-tenth of water use compared to coal plants of a similar size and "approaching zero wastewater discharge when the plant is operating.”

== Environmental impact ==
=== Expected ===
The total amount of pollutants and other products, fossil fuel combustion byproducts (FFB), such as ash and limestone, expected to be emitted was 2.4 million tons because of the way the coal will be burned in a CFB. It was expected for these FFB's to solidify into a cement like substance, allowing for easier disposal. Current estimated numbers for mercury deposited include a 10.2 pounds annually and 204 pounds over an estimated twenty year span of time. 3.4 pounds of this mercury is expected to end up in the Chesapeake Bay Watershed. These numbers are assumed based on the permitted amount of mercury emitted, at 71.93 pounds per year.

The combined effect of CFB's sulfur dioxide removal abilities and use of "dry scrubbers" is expected to remove 99.6 percent of the sulfur dioxide based on Dominion's numbers, and the Department of Environmental Quality gives a 98 percent removal rate for permitting. The burning of gob coal is expected to remove hazardous waste from prior coal mines, preventing toxins from continuing to leach off of them. The biomass used in VCHEC is carbon neutral because all biomass used comes from waste wood, so no timber is cut. The use of this biomass would produce ash and require a source of water as a coolant.

=== Actual ===
Virginia City Hybrid Energy Center has been issued notice of violations for carbon monoxide, particulate matter, and sulfur dioxide. Carbon monoxide emissions during 2012 and early 2013 had three events for one CFB Unit and another three events for a second CFB Unit. Excess emission was at 49.58% for Unit 1 and 72.22% for Unit 2. These resulted from issues with the startup process. CFB Unit 1 had two events in 2013 with excess Sulfur Dioxide emissions as a result of fuel problems; the second one was caused by more fuel being fed than normal. CFB Unit 2 had one Sulfur Dioxide excess emissions citation from an issue during the shut down process.

Photograph of a coal gob pile, like the ones used as fuel for the Virginia City Hybrid Energy Center

The use of coal gob has removed hazardous waste sites from 1907, the Hurricane Creek gob pile, which put the Clinch River at risk. This has allowed for a process removing over a century's worth of waste piles at risk of polluting the Clinch River and other water sources. Around 1.5 million tons were removed from around the stream. Between 2012 and 2014, 1.1 million tons of gob were used as fuel. Waste produced by the plant consists of fly ash and coal ash which are stored in the Curley Hollow CCR Landfill with a collection system to prevent leaching. During 2012, the facility was able to capture around 95% of the sulfur dioxide produced. Satellite Aerosol Data comparing VCHEC to another plant showed the same temporal changes in aerosol and nitrogen dioxide before and after VCHEC opened, but there was a clear change in maximum values after VCHEC began production, meaning the amount of emissions were happening at the same time as the other plant, but more was being emitted after VCHEC's construction.

== Controversy ==
Since Dominion Energy initially proposed plans for VCHEC in 2007 they have been met with opposition from five major environmental advocacy groups: The Sierra Club, Southern Environmental Law Center, Southern Appalachian Mountain Stewards, Appalachian Voices, and Chesapeake Climate Action Network. During initial planning of VCHEC these five groups campaigned the Commonwealth of Virginia to shift their energy plans to more renewable options and not approve the proposed coal fired power plant.

After construction plans were approved by the Commonwealth of Virginia the Southern Environmental Law Center responded by filing an appeal on 22 April 2008 to the Supreme Court of Virginia on grounds that the construction approval violates the Commerce Clause of the Constitution of the United States.

On 21 May 2008 protest groups, listed above, organized a protest of citizens who opposed the construction of VCHEC and delivered a ‘Mile Long’ petition to Dominion Headquarters. The petition was literally a mile long of paper delivered during a shareholders meeting, this did not stop the groundbreaking of the facility on 14 August 2008. Only a month later on 15 September 2008, 11 activists were arrested following a protest which blockaded the VCHEC construction site. Activists from Mountain Justice, Rainforest Action Network, Asheville Rising Tide, Blue Ridge Earth First!, and Students for Democratic Society. This protest did not hinder the construction of VCHEC.

These protests and the opposition against the construction of VCHEC was showcased in the documentary The Electricity Fairy directed by Tom Hansell for Appalshop Films.

== See also ==
- List of power stations in Virginia
