= Atlantic Coast Pipeline =

Planned natural gas pipeline in the U.S.

- Map of Atlantic Coast Pipeline

Location
- Country: United States
- State: WV, VA, NC
- Direction: North-south
- Start: Harrison County, WV
- To: Robeson County, NC

General information
- Type: Natural gas
- Status: Cancelled
- Owner: Atlantic Coast Pipeline, LLC
- Partners: Dominion Energy, Duke Energy, Piedmont Natural Gas, Southern Company Gas

Technical information
- Length: 600 mi (970 km)
- Diameter: 42 in (1,067 mm)

The Atlantic Coast Pipeline was a planned natural gas pipeline slated to run 600 miles (970 km) from West Virginia, through Virginia, to eastern North Carolina. It was canceled in July 2020.

== Characteristics ==
Atlantic Coast Pipeline, LLC was the developer and planned operator of the pipeline; the company was a joint venture between Dominion Energy and Duke Energy, with Dominion serving as the lead stakeholder. The proposed route was to begin in Harrison County, West Virginia, drawing gas from wells in the Utica and Marcellus gas fields, and travel southeast through eastern Virginia and North Carolina to its terminus in Robeson County, North Carolina. The route would have crossed the Appalachian Trail and the Blue Ridge Parkway in Virginia and included a lateral extending east to Chesapeake, Virginia, bringing the total length to about 600 miles (970 km). The pipeline was proposed to have a 42-inch (110 cm) diameter for much of its length, with the southern end in North Carolina measuring 36 inches (91 cm) wide. It would have had a capacity of about 1,500,000,000 cubic feet (42,000,000 m^{3}) of gas daily.

== Development ==
The Atlantic Coast Pipeline originated in September 2013 when the Obama administration granted a request from Dominion Transmission to export gas to Japan and India. The proposal was announced on record at West Virginia County Commissioner Meetings on May 27, 2014, in Lewis County, West Virginia, on July 1, 2014, in Pocahontas County, West Virginia, and on August 7, 2014, in Randolph County, North Carolina, and the developers began the application process for regulatory approval the following month. The Federal Energy Regulatory Commission issued a draft environmental impact statement (EIS) for the project on December 30, 2016, with a final EIS issued on July 21, 2017, after a period of public comment on the draft. Developers had hoped to begin construction in late 2017 and to begin gas transport in late 2019, and the project cost was originally estimated at $5.1 billion.

Legal proceedings stalled construction, however, and expected costs ballooned to nearly $8 billion. On August 6, 2018, the US Fourth Circuit Court of Appeals rescinded two approvals permitting the pipeline, one from the Fish and Wildlife Service and another from the National Park Service regarding crossing the Blue Ridge Parkway. The fact that the proposed route crossed beneath the Appalachian Trail generated significant legal difficulty, and the Supreme Court reversed the Fourth Circuit's ruling on the Forest Service's permit process, deciding that the Appalachian Trail's segment through the George Washington National Forest was a right-of-way on land belonging to the Forest Service rather than land part of the National Park System where pipelines may not be built. The permit to cross the Blue Ridge Parkway was still pending.

The Atlantic Coast Pipeline was one of the priority infrastructure projects of the Donald Trump administration, and the administration backed Dominion Energy throughout the appeal process.

Dominion Energy had hoped to have completed the pipeline, which was to be built in sections, by late 2021, with service by early 2022. Atlantic Coast Pipeline, LLC claimed that the project will generate $28 million per year in local tax revenue, 17,240 construction-based jobs, and 2,200 jobs in other fields.

== Opposition to the Atlantic Coast Pipeline ==
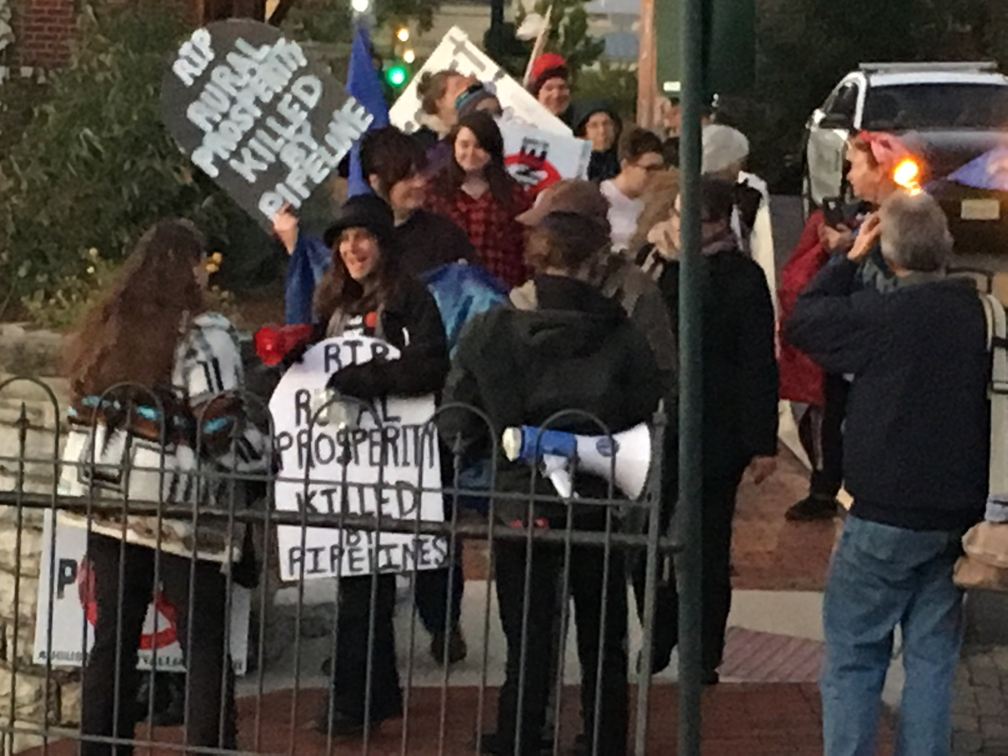
Protest against the Atlantic Coast Pipeline in Staunton, Virginia, 21 October 2018

Plans for the pipeline led to protests from landowners in its path, largely in Virginia. An anti-pipeline group, "All Pain No Gain," raised money to run radio and television advertising in opposition of the pipeline, and dozens of landowners attempted to block surveyors from their property, though the pipeline's developers filed lawsuits against them, and Virginia law permits surveying on private property, as well as the use of eminent domain in construction. Local community groups, including Nelson County, VA-based Friends of Wintergreen, a not-for-profit group representing the largest residential and recreational communities in Virginia, retained national pipeline engineers and environmental specialists to demonstrate the technical infeasibility and inappropriateness of the project in western Virginia. Environmental groups, including the Sierra Club, Southern Environmental Law Center (a Charlottesville, Virginia-based non-profit), and Appalachian Voices, also expressed opposition. After the issuance of the draft EIS, a Sierra Club official said that the developers had not proven the demand for the gas transported by the pipeline, as well as criticizing the EIS for not addressing the risks of building a pipeline through unstable karst terrain prone to sinkholes and landslides. An official at Dominion Energy, said that the pipeline route had been adjusted 300 times, for a total of 250 miles (400 km) of rerouting, since its original draft in order to accommodate "environmentally sensitive areas" and other concerns. Exaggerated claims of job creation were challenged by student reporters in West Virginia.

Critics note that the proposed route disproportionately impacts Native Americans, including members of the Meherrin, Haliwa-Saponi, Coharie, and Lumbee Tribes of North Carolina. Data from the EIS show that Native Americans make up over 13% of the population living in census tracts located within one mile of the proposed route through North Carolina while constituting only 1.2% of the state's population. Although the EIS contained an environmental justice analysis as required by federal Executive Order 12898, the analysis failed to identify disproportionate impacts, leading an academic researcher to highlight links between the flawed analysis and the failure of regulators and developers to adequately consult tribal governments. The same researcher noted similarities between tribal consultation issues surrounding both the Atlantic Coast Pipeline and the Dakota Access Pipeline. Individual tribal governments and North Carolina's Commission of Indian Affairs have raised formal concerns to federal regulators about lack of government consultation on the Atlantic Coast Pipeline project. The National Congress of American Indians also issued a formal resolution calling for permitting activities to cease until regulators engage in meaningful consultation with the Haliwa-Saponi and other tribes living along the proposed route. Overall, approximately 30,000 Native Americans live in census tracts located within one mile of the proposed route of the Atlantic Coast Pipeline.

Communities that would be affected by the Atlantic Coast Pipeline have begun direct, nonviolent action to oppose it. Bill and Lynn Limpert, who own 120 acres of property near the pipeline's planned route, organized a summer encampment titled "No Pipeline Summer: Camp to Save the Limperts’ Land.” The encampment, which lasted through the summer of 2018, was composed of visitors opposed to the Atlantic Coast Pipeline or the Mountain Valley Pipeline.

One major lawsuit filed in opposition to the pipeline was due to permits granted by the United States Forest Service (USFS) to allow a 0.1 miles (0.16 km) run of the pipeline to cross about 600 feet (180 m) under the Appalachian Trail. A coalition of environmental groups filed suit against the USFS and the development group on several grounds, including that the decision to issue the permit was arbitrary and capricious and that the special use right of way authority for the lands of the Appalachian Trail, considered part of the National Parks System, could not be granted. The United States Court of Appeals for the Fourth Circuit ruled in favor of these groups on several grounds, including that the Trail was a national park and outside the USFS' jurisdiction. The case was appealed to the U.S. Supreme Court, which found in United States Forest Service v. Cowpasture River Preservation Assn. in June 2020 that the Trail itself was considered only to be a right of way within the national forest, and the USFS had authority to issue the permit. Other parts of the original lawsuit remain valid, such as the arbitrary and capricious consideration of the USFS decision.

== Cancellation ==
On July 5, 2020, Dominion Energy and Duke Energy announced that they would cancel the project due to legal uncertainty and delays concerning the project's costs. On the same day, Berkshire Hathaway Energy announced it had reached an agreement to acquire Dominion Energy's gas transmission and storage business for $9.7 billion. Berkshire Hathaway did not acquire the incomplete Atlantic Coast Pipeline as part of the deal.

At the time of cancellation, easements for 98 percent of the route of the Atlantic Coast Pipeline had been secured and 31.4 miles of pipe had already been installed. The utilities plan to leave the installed pipe in place and keep the easement agreements they had purchased from landowners along the pipeline route, including those secured through eminent domain. This leaves open the possibility that the project could potentially be revived at a later date.

== See also ==
- Energy policy of the Barack Obama administration
- Energy policy of the Donald Trump administration
- Dakota Access Pipeline
- Keystone Pipeline System
