= Appalachian Voices =

American environmental organization

- Formation: 1997; 29 years ago
- Founder: Harvard Ayers
- Type: Nonprofit
- Tax ID no.: 56-2049956
- Legal status: 501(c)(3)
- Headquarters: Boone, North Carolina, USA
- Executive Director: Tom Cormons, J.D.
- Board Chair: Tracey Wright
- Affiliations: The Appalachian Voice publication
- Budget: $2,551,243
- Staff: 30
- Website: https://appvoices.org

Appalachian Voices is an American environmental organization. Their stated environmental concerns include eliminating air pollution, ending mountaintop removal, cleaning up coal ash pollution and promoting renewable energy and energy efficiency.

The organization has offices in Boone, North Carolina; Charlottesville, Virginia; Norton, Virginia; and Knoxville, Tennessee.

Appalachian Voices publishes "The Appalachian Voice," a news publication covering environmental and cultural news in the central and southern Appalachian region.

== History ==
The Appalachian Voice publication was started in Boone, North Carolina in February 1996 by Harvard Ayers and Than Axtell as part of the now-defunct Southern Appalachian Highlands Ecoregion Task Force, a chapter of the Sierra Club. Ayers, seeing "a need for an advocacy organization that could focus exclusively on local issues related to Appalachia," officially founded Appalachian Voices as a 501(c)3 organization in July 1997.

=== Wise County coal plant campaign ===
In 2007, Appalachian Voices joined with four regional organizations in Virginia to fight construction of a 585-megawatt coal-fired power plant that the state's largest utility was seeking to build in Wise County, Virginia. Along with Chesapeake Climate Action Network, the Sierra Club's Virginia Chapter, the Southern Appalachian Mountain Stewards, and the Southern Environmental Law Center, the groups formed the Wise Energy for Virginia Coalition to oppose the plant.

The coalition's focus on the Wise County plant made it "by any standard, the biggest environmental controversy in Virginia today," according to the state's largest newspaper, The Virginia Pilot. The coalition built a grassroots base of more than 45,000 Virginians who signed a "Mile-Long Petition" in opposition to the plant.

In March 2008, the Virginia State Corporation Commission (SCC) issued its decision to approve Dominion's proposed 1.8 billion dollar power plant despite Dominion having no plan to capture the millions of tons of carbon dioxide the plant would release. In the following months, Appalachian Voices, along with the Southern Environmental Law Center, Sierra Club, Chesapeake Climate Action Network, and Southern Appalachian Mountain Stewards submitted three court filings against the plant. In 2009, the Supreme Court of Virginia ruled in favor of Dominion and the plant.

On January 11, 2010, Appalachian Voices and allies filed against the plant's air quality permits, citing the large amount of carbon dioxide released by the facility. The group used Massachusetts v. EPA to argue that carbon dioxide is a Clean Air Act pollutant, and it has been subject to regulation under the act through reporting, recordkeeping, and monitoring since 1993. Ultimately, the court ruled in favor of the plant.

Although the Virginia City Hybrid Energy Center was ultimately approved, the public pressure generated by the coalition temporarily led to dramatic reductions in permitted pollutant limits, including:

- The most stringent mercury emissions limit for any coalfired power plant in the country, reducing emissions levels by ninety-four percent from those originally proposed;
- An eighty-four percent reduction in permitted levels of sulfur dioxide;
- Carbon offset measures that will decrease CO_{2} emissions from the plant by 1.1 million tons per year.

=== Mountaintop Removal and Surface Mining Studies ===
In 2016, Appalachian Voices partnered with Duke University and SkyTruth to study the long term environmental footprint of surface mining and mountaintop removal in Appalachia. The study was published in July 2018 and mainly focused on the effects of mountaintop removal coal mining with valley fills (MTMVF). In order to map the full extent of mining impact, the study employed Google Earth Engine.

== See also ==
- Mountaintop removal
- List of environmental organizations
