= List of power stations in Virginia =

Sources of Virginia utility-scale electricity generation in gigawatt-hours, full-year 2025:
1. Natural gas: 60,696 (56.5%)
2. Nuclear: 28,214 (26.3%)
3. Solar: 9,083 (8.45%)
4. Coal: 3,607 (3.36%)
5. Biomass: 3,580 (3.33%)
6. Hydroelectric: 1,237 (1.15%)
7. Petroleum: 500 (0.47%)
8. Wind: 50 (0.05%)
9. Other: 467 (0.43%)

This is a list of electricity-generating power stations in the U.S. state of Virginia. In 2024, Virginia had a total summer capacity of 29.1 GW through all of its power plants, and a net generation of 102,698 GWh. In 2025, the electrical energy generation mix was 56.5% natural gas, 26.3% nuclear, 8.5% solar, 3.4% coal, 3.3% biomass, 1.2% hydroelectric, and less than 1% from petroleum, wind, and other.

The Virginia Clean Economy Act of 2020 directs the construction of 16,100 MW of solar power and onshore wind and up to 5,200 MW of offshore wind by 2035, bringing the state's utility-delivered power to 100% renewable energy by 2045. It planned to close all but two coal-fired plants by 2024, with the Virginia City and Clover plants allowed to operate until 2045, though economic conditions may close them earlier.

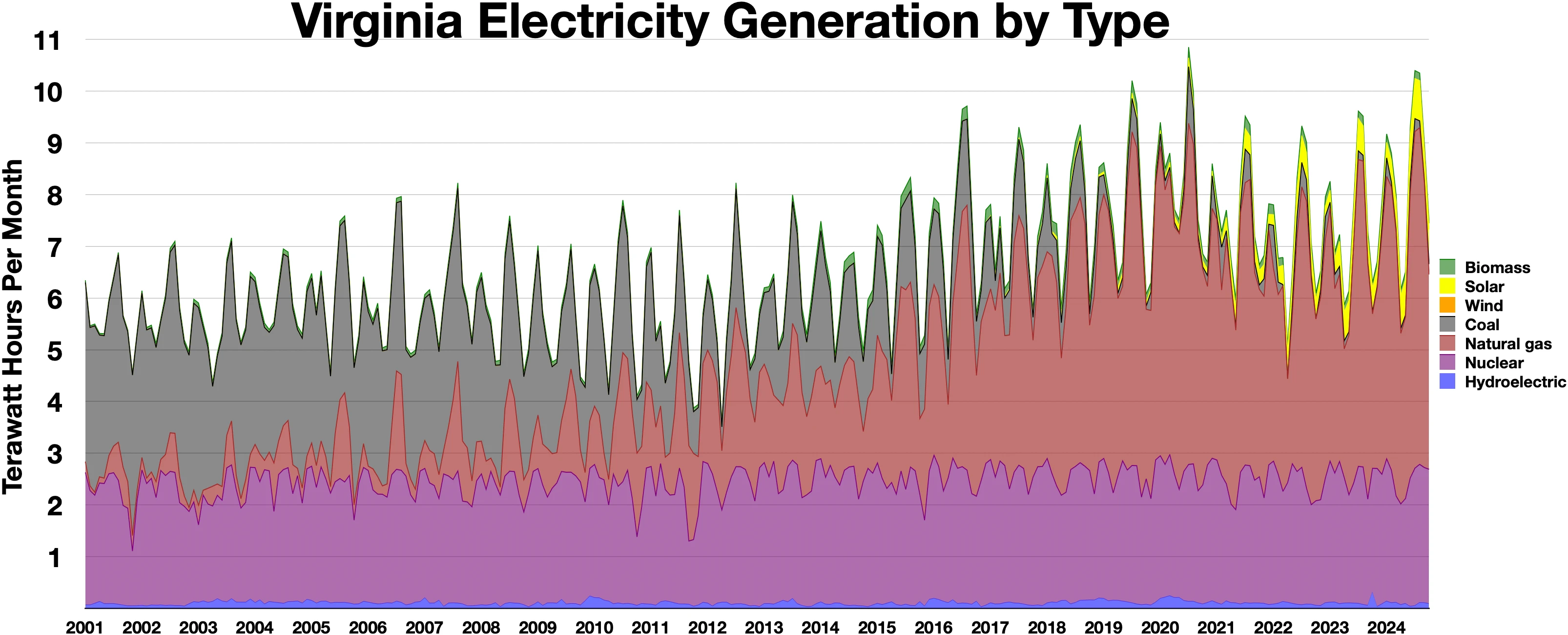
Virginia electricity generation by type

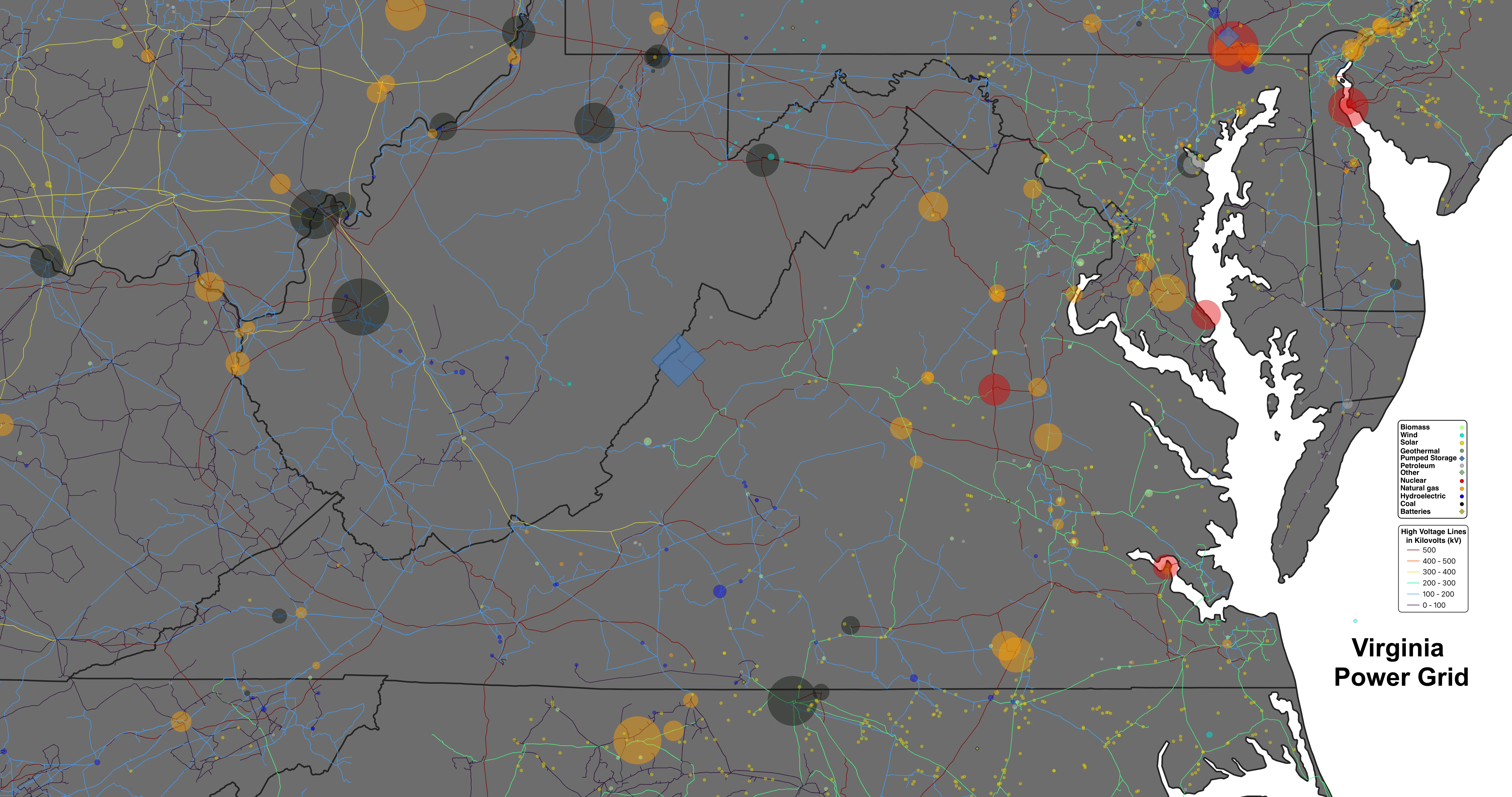
Virginia power grid

== Power stations ==
Name	Location	Fuel	Capacity (MW)	Notes
Altavista Power Station	Altavista	Biomass	51	
Aria Energy Phase I & II	Lorton	Natural gas	6.4	
Bath County Pumped Storage Station	Warm Springs	Hydroelectric - pumped-storage	3030	
Bear Garden		Natural gas	559	
Bellemeade Power Station	Richmond	Natural gas, oil	267	Decommissioned
Birchwood Power Partners, L.P.	King George	Coal	242	Decommissioned
Bremo Power Station	Bremo Bluff	Natural gas (converted from coal in 2014)	227	Decommissioned
Brunswick County		Natural gas	1472	
Chesapeake Energy Center	Chesapeake	Coal	717	Decommissioned
Chesterfield Power Station	Chester	Coal, natural gas	1415	Coal, decommissioned
Clover Power Station	Clover	Coal	865	
Darbytown		Natural gas	368	
Doswell		Natural gas	939	
Elizabeth River		Natural gas	389	
Gordonsville		Natural gas	300	
I-95 Energy Resource Recovery Facility	Lorton	Waste incineration	95	
Hopewell Cogeneration		Natural gas	399	
Hopewell Power Station	Hopewell	Biomass	51	
John H. Kerr Dam	Boydton	Hydroelectric	297	
Ladysmith		Natural gas	893	
Louisa		Natural gas	509	
Low Moor Power Station	Low Moor	Oil	48	
Martinsville Dam	Martinsville	Hydroelectric	1.3	
Mecklenburg Power Station	Clarksville	Coal	138	Decommissioned
North Anna Nuclear Generating Station	Mineral	Uranium	1790	
Potomac Energy Center (formerly Panda Stonewall Energy Center)	Leesburg	Natural gas (combined cycle)	778	
Philpott Dam	Bassett	Hydroelectric	7	
Pittsylvania Power Station	Hurt	Biomass	83	Decommissioned
Possum Point Power Station	Dumfries	Natural gas, oil	849	
Remington		Natural gas	706	
Reworld Alexandria/Arlington Waste To Energy Facility	Alexandria	Waste incineration	23	
Smith Mountain Dam	Sandy Level	Hydroelectric - pumped-storage	656	
Southampton Power Station	Franklin	Biomass	51	
Spotsylvania Solar	Spotsylvania	Solar	617	
Spruance Genco- Cogentrix	Richmond	Natural gas	240	
Stonewall		Natural gas	812	
Surry Nuclear Power Plant	Surry	Uranium	1678	
Virginia City Hybrid Energy Center	Wise County	Coal	610	
Yorktown Power Station	Yorktown	Coal, oil	1141	Decommissioned
Warren County		Natural gas	1472	

Planned stations
Name	Location	Fuel	Capacity (MW)	Year	Notes
Coastal Virginia Offshore Wind	Offshore	Wind	2,640		
Rocky Forge Wind	Botetourt County	Wind	75	2021	

== See also ==
- List of power stations in the United States
- Commonwealth Fusion Systems - fusion power plant to be built in the 2030s in Virginia
