= Clover Power Station =

Coal-fired power plant in the United States

Clover Power Station is a coal-fired power plant in Halifax County, Virginia, which runs mostly during extreme temperatures. In the past it had been run for baseload power. It is one of two coal power plants still running in the state, the other being Virginia City Hybrid Energy Center, which is also owned by Dominion. It is notable for being kept running to power Virginia's Data Center Alley. Previously it might have been considered as a site for a small nuclear reactor. Dominion plans to keep it running until at least 2045.
