= Questar Corporation (gas company) =

Coordinates: 40°46′N 111°53′W

- Industry: Public utility Hydrocarbon exploration
- Founded: 1928; 98 years ago
- Defunct: 2024; 2 years ago
- Fate: Acquired by Enbridge
- Headquarters: Salt Lake City, Utah, United States
- Products: Natural Gas

Questar Corporation was a natural gas public utility based in Salt Lake City, Utah. In June 2024, it was reported that Enbridge had completed its acquisition of the company for $4.3 billion.

== History ==
Questar Corporation was organized in Utah in 1984 as the holding company for Mountain Fuel Supply Company.

In 1922, the Ohio Oil Company discovered natural gas near Rock Springs, Wyoming. Ohio Oil joined with Prairie Oil & Gas Co. and the Crawford interest of Pittsburgh to form the Western Public Service Corporation (incorporated October 6, 1928). Mountain Fuel Supply Company became the company's hydrocarbon exploration and production affiliate. Pipeline construction was begun on March 3, 1929 and was completed by October. See map here. The 380 mile pipeline of the Uintah Pipe Line Co. subsidiary cost $24 million to build and could deliver 60mmcfd. Distribution was through subsidiaries Ogden Gas Co., Utah Gas & Coke Co. (Salt Lake City), both acquired from the American Public Utilities Co. (Insull interests), and Wasatch Gas Co. organized in 1929 (serving the remainder of the territory, including those town lying between Salt Lake City and Ogden). in 1931 the Utah Valley Gas & Coke of Provo was acquired, but due to a stable supply of surplus coal gas was not supplied with natural gas until 1948.

During the Great Depression, its stock price fell from $46/share in September 1929 to $3/share in 1932 as most families could not afford natural gas.

In 1935, the shareholders voted to reorganize the company, merging it with its subsidiaries and moving its headquarters from Pittsburgh to Salt Lake City. Mountain Fuel Supply Company became the name of the reorganized consolidated company.

In the mid-1930s, the company discovered natural gas in the Clay Basin region northeast of Utah.

During World War II, the company was required by the War Production Board to halt new natural gas utility signups so that resources can be conserved for the war effort.

In 1946, the company discovered the Church Buttes field in southwestern Wyoming.

In 1971, the company acquired Interstate Brick, the largest brick-making facility in the Western United States. It was sold in 1990.

In 1972, the company discovered the Brady field, about 30 miles southeast of Wyoming. In 1976, certain shareholders attempted to replace management. At issue was whether management would "acknowledge or act upon the fact that the company was more of an oil company than a natural gas utility".

In 1984, Mountain Fuel Supply Company shareholders voted to return to the holding company structure, and chose the name Questar Corporation as the new parent holding company name.

In 1989, the company established a subsidiary, Questar Telecom, which acquired specialized mobile radio operations. It also formed FuelMaker, a joint venture to market a new device that would allow natural gas vehicles to be refueled at home.

In 1993, the company had three major lines of business: exploration and production activities conducted by Wexpro Company, Celsius Energy Company, and Universal Resources Corporation; interstate transmission activities conducted by Questar Pipeline Company; and retail distribution activities conducted by Mountain Fuel.

In 1994, it acquired oil and gas properties from Union Pacific Resources for $94.5 million. In August, Questar Telecom was sold to Nextel Communications for 3.9 million shares of stock.

On January 1, 1998, Mountain Fuel Supply Company was renamed Questar Gas Company. In September, the company acquired HSRTW Inc., which owned oil and gas reserves in Oklahoma, for $155 million.

In 2001, the company acquired Shenandoah Energy for $406 million in cash and assumed debt.

In April 2003, D. N. "Nick" Rose, president and chief executive officer of Questar, retired and was replaced by Alan K. Allred.

In 2005, Knox Lawrence International acquired Consonus Inc., Consonus Inc., a Questar Corp. subsidiary that managed computer data centers for businesses.

In November 2006, the company was added to the S&P 500. It was removed from the index in 2010.

On July 1, 2010, the company completed the corporate spin-off of its exploration and production business as QEP Resources. In December 2015, Tesoro Logistics LP acquired its natural-gas pipeline and processing business for $2.5 billion in cash. In 2021, QEP Resources was acquired by Diamondback Energy.

In March 2012, the company moved from 180 East 100 South to its new headquarters building, a $45 million 170,000 square foot 6-story building at 333 South State Street in downtown Salt Lake City, Utah. It is one of the first LEED Silver energy-efficient buildings in downtown Salt Lake City.

In September 2016, the company was acquired by Dominion Resources. In June 2024, nine months after a deal was announced, Enbridge completed the purchase of Questar Gas for $4.3 billion.
