= Southern Environmental Law Center =

Legal nonprofit based in Virginia

- Abbreviation: SELC
- Formation: 1986; 40 years ago
- Founder: Rick Middleton
- Type: 501(c)(3)
- Headquarters: Charlottesville, Virginia, U.S.
- Region served: Southern United States
- President: DJ Gerken
- Revenue: $82.8 M (2022)
- Expenses: $32.8 M (2022)
- Staff: More than 100 attorneys

The Southern Environmental Law Center (SELC) is the largest 501(c)(3) environmental nonprofit organization in the southeastern United States, with more than 100 attorneys and 200 staff members overall working at the local, state, and federal level. Headquartered in Charlottesville, Virginia, SELC has nine offices in six states: Alabama, Georgia, North Carolina, South Carolina, Tennessee and Virginia. The organization also has an office on Capitol Hill in Washington D.C.

SELC was founded in 1986 by Rick Middleton, later President Emeritus. For 30 years Jeff Gleason was executive director and president of the organization. As of October 3, 2022, SELC is under the leadership of Executive Director DJ Gerken. It is supported by charitable gifts from individuals, families, and foundations.

The purpose of SELC is to protect the natural environment of the southeastern United States through environmental law. The Appalachian Mountains, thousands of acres of National forest (United States) in the southeastern United States, and the Atlantic Coast are among the areas the organization is working to protect.

Energy Weekly News noted that "The South's energy choices aren't just affecting our own backyard. If our six states region were a country, it would be the seventh largest emitter of carbon dioxide."

== Advocacy and litigation ==
In a unanimous decision, in April 2007 the Supreme Court of the United States ruled power companies could no longer continue to extend the lives of old, coal-burning power plants without installing modern pollution controls in the Environmental Defense v. Duke Energy Corp. case. This ruling led to the largest power plant cleanup in U.S. history. SELC attorneys then blocked or deferred companies’ plans to construct seven new coal-burning units across six states, helping to retire one-third of the existing coal plant capacity in the region.

SELC's years-long campaign to stop utilities from storing coal ash in unlined, leaking pits next to rivers has led to the largest ever cleanup of industrial pollution in the Southeast. The organization has reached agreements to store or recycle all coal ash in South Carolina. SELC's work has prompted Duke Energy to clean up 8 of its 14 sites in North Carolina, with active cases at the rest. Its suit challenging TVA's Gallatin plant resulted in the first time a federal court ordered a utility to excavate its coal ash.

After a six-year campaign spearheaded by SELC, Dominion Energy and Duke Energy abandoned the Atlantic Coast Pipeline. SELC successfully challenged six key pipeline permits, halted construction, and secured a precedential ruling in favor of environmental justice in Virginia.

The SELC is one of three environmental groups which filed suit against the United States Fish and Wildlife Service which "they say should have blocked the planned extension of the N.C. 540 highway across southern Wake County" because it would "threaten the existence of two endangered species of mussels that live in a creek the road would cross." The Law Center argued the case in the United States Court of Appeals for the Fourth Circuit where the court "vacated a key permit granted to the Atlantic Coast Pipeline," concluding "that the U.S. Fish and Wildlife Service provided no specific limits for the allowable impact on threatened and endangered species."

An environmental justice lawsuit brought by SELC compelled a federal court to overturn a permit for a pipeline compressor station in Buckingham County, Virginia's, historic community of Union Hill.

The organization's Protect Our Coast campaign helped persuade the Obama Administration to remove the South Atlantic from seismic exploration and the federal offshore leasing plan in 2016.

SELC's Solar Power Initiative is boosting solar growth in the South by removing disincentives and regulatory roadblocks. As of 2022, rates of solar are up to 23,000 megawatts, and homes with solar are up to 100,000. The benefits of using solar energy is lower electricity bills, creating new local jobs, and providing advancements towards a cleaner energy economy.

When the Trump administration announced its effort to gut clean water protections from wetlands and streams that feed drinking water sources for 200 million Americans (and 32 million people in the South), SELC responded with a federal lawsuit that more than a dozen other groups signed on to.

SELC has prevented the construction of roadways and logging for 700,000 acres of land in the six-state region. For example, they prevented the doubling of Interstate 81 in Virginia, and continue to seek new sustainable land use strategies and funding public transit.

Has been in partnership with multiple other non-profits supporting the United States Court of Appeals for the District of Columbia Circuit decision to shut down the Southeast Energy Exchange Market (SEEM) and overrule the Federal Energy Regulatory Commission(FERC) decision to unlawfully approve the market. SEEM was a proposal that was meant to facilitate bilateral trading allowing members to buy and sell energy close to the time most energy is consumed, which would utilize the unavailable unreserved transmissions. In reality, it was creating unequal terms between members and encouraged lucrative trading between utilities.

== Partners and Community ==
SELC works alongside 300 local, state, national, and international partner organizations to help converse in ideas and knowledge of environmental activism. For example, they work with the Lumber River community in North Carolina to maintain clean and safe water, the Pine Grove community working to preserve their endangered historic black school in Cumberland County, Virginia, local rural and predominantly black communities to help fight against the building of the Atlantic Coast Pipeline, and so much more.

The organization also has a podcast called Broken Ground telling the stories of environmentally active people in the southeastern region either dealing with or conquering environmental injustices.

SELC also has a magazine that tells the stories and experiences of their communities playing their part. The first issue came out during the Summer of 2023.

== Charity rating ==
SELC has a 100% score and the highest four-star rating from Charity Navigator, an independent charity assessment organization. In order to receive the score the organization was graded on four different categories: impacts and results, accountability and finance, culture and community, and leadership and adaptability. They also were awarded the Platinum level GuideStar Exchange that represents their commitment to transparency, meaning they are very open to their people and represent good leadership skills.

== See also ==
- List of environmental and conservation organizations in the United States
- Southern Poverty Law Center
