= Coastal Virginia Offshore Wind =

U.S. wind energy project

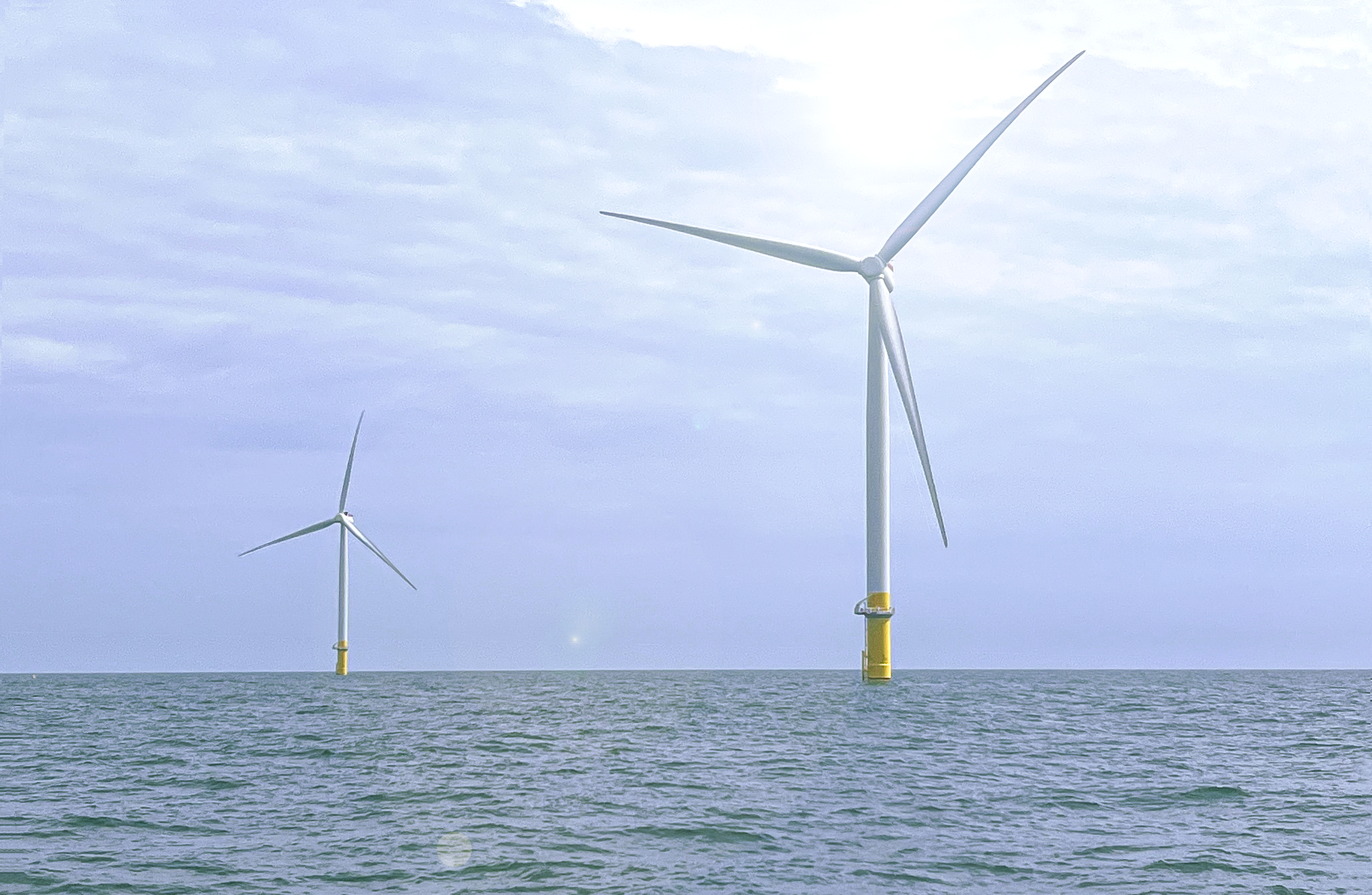
- Country: United States
- Location: OCS-A 0483, off the coast of Virginia
- Coordinates: 36.891667°N 75.491667°W
- Status: Under construction
- Construction began: November 2023
- Owner: Dominion Energy

Wind farm
- Distance from shore: 24 nmi (28 mi; 44 km)
- Hub height: 482 feet (147 m)
- Rotor diameter: 728 feet (222 m)
- Site area: 112,800 acres (176.3 sq mi; 456 km^{2})

Power generation
- Units operational: 176 x 14.7 MW (to be installed) 2 x 6 MW (pilot project)
- Make and model: Siemens Gamesa SWT-6.0-154
- Nameplate capacity: 2.6 GW
- Capacity factor: 0.42

External links
- Website: Dominion CVOW
- Commons: Related media on Commons

Coastal Virginia Offshore Wind (CVOW) is an offshore wind energy project located about 24 nautical miles (28 mi; 44 km) off the coast of Virginia Beach in the Hampton Roads metropolitan area of Virginia, U.S. CVOW is being developed by Dominion Energy and is the largest offshore wind project under development in the U.S., covering a lease area of 112,800 acres (456 km^{2}) and expected to have a capacity of 2.6 gigawatts (GW). It is expected to generate electricity equivalent to the power consumed by 660,000 homes. The wind farm will consist of 176 Siemens Gamesa SG 14-222 DD fixed-bottom wind turbines, each of which has a capacity of 14.6 megawatts (MW) and a 222-metre (728 ft) rotor diameter. Dominion expects that the project will cost $10.7 billion.

CVOW is one of the first commercial offshore wind farms built in U.S. federal waters and aims to contribute substantially to Virginia's renewable energy targets, which call for a total offshore wind capacity of 5.2 GW by the end of 2035 and 100 percent clean energy by 2050. The project is the only offshore wind farm in the U.S. being developed by a state public utility company (Dominion) as opposed to a private developer. This offers it more flexibility in changing electricity prices in response to project cost changes, which is not an option for private developers with fixed-price agreements. In 2020, CVOW was expected to create 900 construction jobs and 1,100 jobs once in operation, as well as $210 million in economic output.

Before construction of the primary commercial-scale project, Dominion built a pilot project on the edge of the lease area that was completed in 2020 in collaboration with Danish energy company Ørsted. The project features two Siemens Gamesa SWT-6.0-154 6 MW wind turbines. The purpose of the pilot project was to research new technologies in offshore wind and develop innovative ways of reducing costs. The lessons learnt from this project were made publicly available by the Bureau of Ocean Energy Management (BOEM) to support the advancement of the offshore wind energy sector in the U.S., and informed the development of CVOW, which is now under construction and expected to be completed in 2026.

In order to get the electricity generated to the onshore grid, the wind farm will feature three offshore substations that collect and bundle together the electricity from the turbines. This will in turn be delivered to an onshore landing station at the State Military Reservation (SMR) in Virginia Beach by undersea cables. These cables continue underground to a switching station at the Naval Air Station Oceana, after which the energy can be delivered to Dominion's existing Fentress Substation in Chesapeake, Virginia, to be connected to the electrical grid. In order to support construction, Dominion is developing its own turbine installation vessel which will be the first Jones Act-compliant offshore wind vessel, and will be used to support other projects after CVOW. This is significant both for the ease of transportation during CVOW's construction, as well as for the growth of a domestic supply chain for offshore wind in the U.S. as a whole.

On 22 December 2025, the US interior department suspended five offshore wind leases (Vineyard Wind 1 off the coast of Massachusetts, Sunrise Wind and Empire Wind in New York, and CVOW and Revolution Wind in Rhode Island) over what it said were "national security concerns". Ørsted filed a lawsuit.

On 12 January 2026, US district judge Royce Lamberth overturned the construction freeze of Revolution Wind. He said this project is likely to succeed in the ongoing legal dispute.

== Development timeline ==
This timeline traces the development from the project from 2012 to 2027 when the operation of CVOW is expected begin. It is organized in four distinct phases that the project must go through in order to be complete. The first phase is early development and planning, during which time the Bureau of Ocean Energy Management (BOEM) gauges interest in a new lease area, evaluates the environmental impacts that may be imposed on it by construction, and conducts an auction to select a developer for a new offshore wind project. During the second phase, environmental review and permitting, the developer must submit a plan for how they will build, operate, and decommission the project. In response to this, BOEM must conduct an environmental analysis to assess the impacts of the plan, and consider comments submitted from the public regarding the public. In the third phase, record of decision and approvals, BOEM along with other implicated agencies must consider the environmental analysis and make a final decision on whether or not to approve the project. If approved, the project moves to the final phase during which is the action construction and installation of the wind farm.

Early development and planning	February 3, 2012: Bureau of Ocean Energy Management (BOEM) releases Call for Information and Nominations to assess interest in Call Area; February 3, 2012: Environmental Assessment of Call Area completed with Finding of No Significant Impact (FONSI); September 4, 2013: BOEM holds lease action, awarded to Dominion Energy; November 1, 2013: Lease signed; October 12, 2017: BOEM approves Site Assessment Plan (SAP)
Environmental review and permitting	December 2020: Dominion submits initial Construction & Operations Plan (COP); July 2, 2021: BOEM publishes a Notice of Intent (NOI) to prepare an Environmental Impact Statement (EIS) for Dominion Energy initiating a 30-day public comment period.; December 12, 2022: BOEM releases Draft EIS; September 29, 2023: BOEM releases Final EIS
Record of decision and approvals	October 30, 2023: BOEM and other agencies issue joint Record of Decision (ROD); January 28, 2024: BOEM approves final COP (COP)
Construction and installation	November 2023: Onshore construction for underground export circuits begins.; April 2024: Construction of offshore substations and turbines begins.; Late 2026: Project construction completed.; 2027: Project operation commences.

== Lease area ==
=== Location ===
Coastal Virginia Offshore Wind is located in federally controlled waters on Commercial Lease Outer Continental Shelf (OSC)-A-0483 which is approximately 24 nautical miles (28 mi; 44 km) off the Virginia Beach coastline. The lease area comprises 112,800 acres (176.3 sq mi; 456 km^{2}) and the entirety of this area will be occupied by the wind farm. The pilot project, which was built just on the western edge of the main commercial lease area, occupies its own lease area named Research Lease OCS-A-0497. This lease area is 2,135 acres (3.336 sq mi; 8.64 km^{2}) and is directly attached to OCS-A-0483.

=== History ===
In 2009, the Bureau of Ocean Energy Management (BOEM) initiated the renewable energy program (authorized under the Energy Policy Act of 2005), which provides a structure for regional planning and analysis, lease issuance, site assessment, and construction and operations. BOEM is required by the Outer Continental Shelf Lands Act (OCSLA) to award offshore wind lease areas competitively, through a "Call for Information and Nominations" process. BOEM published its Call for Information and Nominations on the February 3, 2012, in the Federal Register to gauge interest for the Call Area. The Call additionally asked for information from the public regarding issues relevant to the review of nominations for the potential lease area.

On February 3, 2012, BOEM published a Final Environmental Assessment and Finding of No Significant Impact for commercial wind lease issuance and site assessment activities on the Atlantic Outer Continental Shelf (OCS) offshore New Jersey, Delaware, Maryland, and Virginia. BOEM published the "Virginia Proposed Sale Notice" in December, 2012 which provided the terms and conditions of the lease, which was followed by the "Final Sale Notice" published in July 2013 which announced that a commercial lease auction would be held on September 4, 2013, for OCS-A-0483. This was the second competitive lease sale for renewable energy on the OCS. The auction had two participants, Virginia Electric and Power Company (doing business as Dominion Virginia Power) and Apex Virginia Offshore Wind, LLC, and consisted of 6 rounds. Bids started at $225,598 but rose to $1,500,508 by Apex in the final round and $1.6 million by Dominion, which ultimately won them the lease. The lease went into effect on November 1, 2013.

A Call for Information and Nominations for Research Lease OCS-A-0497 was submitted on 8 February 2013. In December of that year BOEM announced a "Determination of No Competitive Interest" stating that there was no significant interest from multiple parties to acquire the lease, which allowed them to proceed with issuing it on a non-competitive basis to a single interested entity. The lease was executed in March 2015 and was the first wind energy research lease in federal waters.

== Regulatory and permitting process ==
In 2017, the Site Assessment Plan, detailing the methods Dominion would use to collect data on the marine environment in the lease area, was submitted to BOEM and approved. Following this, in December 2020, Dominion submitted its first version of a Construction and Operations Plan (COP) for CVOW to BOEM. The COP laid out detailed plans for the construction, operation, and eventual decommissioning of the project. After this submission, approval for the project was required both at the state and federal levels. State confirmation was required from the Virginia State Corporation Commission (SCC) firstly to affirm that CVOW meets all state statutory requirements for rider cost recovery. Rider costs refer to charges on ratepayer electricity bills that are additional to the base rate that account for variable costs separate from the standard rate. It is necessary for the SCC to approve Dominions right to "recover" these costs through electricity bills. In addition to this, state jurisdiction over construction constitutes on land infrastructure as well as offshore infrastructure as far as three miles off the coast, after which waters fall under federal control. In 2022, the SCC issued a Certificate of Public Convenience and Necessity based on review of the COP that confirmed the need for the project and allowed construction that fell in its jurisdiction,.

=== Environmental impact statement ===
At the federal level, after the submission of the COP, BOEM released a Notice of Intent (NOI) in July 2021 to prepare an Environmental Impact Statement (EIS) to review the potential impacts of the COP and inform a final decision on whether to approve CVOW. The release of the NOI marked the beginning of a 30-day public comment period during which individuals or organizations not directly involved in the projects could voice comments or concerns regarding CVOW and its impacts. Following this BOEM released a draft EIS in December 2022 which initiated another public comment period. After this, these further comments are taken into account in order to publish the final EIS which was released in September 2023. This document was used to inform federal agency decisions regarding the project.

The EIS outlines the multiple federal agencies that have an interest in the impact analysis. The report not only informed BOEM's decision on the project, but also the National Marine Fisheries Service's (NMFS) decision on whether to allow CVOW's request for an incidental take permit. This request for authorization is the consequence of the potential disturbance to marine mammals that construction and operation of the wind farm might have. The permits are issued under section 10 of the Endangered Species Act and are a mandatory part of compliance for projects like CVOW under the National Environmental Policy Act (NEPA). In addition to approval from the NMFS, the EIS would also inform the United States Army Corps of Engineers' (ACE) evaluation of CVOW under the Clean Water Act and the River and Harbors Act.

In order to carry out their analysis, BOEM employs a "maximum-case scenario" methodology whereby each aspect of the project is analyzed according to what the greatest potential impact could be. Consideration is given to physical, biological, socioeconomic, and cultural factors that may be affected. In order for this analysis to be carried out, Dominion was required as part of their COP to develop a Project Design Envelope (PDE) which defines project parameters and characteristics while maintaining a degree of flexibility for selection of components and design. With the PDE, each aspect of the project is analyzed according to its highest conceivable impact that may reasonably occur.

The in depth environmental analysis was carried out not only for the proposed project in the COP but also for a range of proposed alternatives. These alternatives were developed by BOEM in consultation with the developer as well as other agencies such as the NMFS and in response to comments received during the public comment period. Comparing alternatives allowed BOEM to identify its preferred plan which is required by NEPA and informs BOEM's final decision in the Record of Decision (ROD). Importantly, this preference is not a binding mandate for the final decision.

The first alternative was named "No Action" which simply meant BOEM would not approve CVOW. The purpose of carrying out an environmental analysis was to provide a baseline comparison. Following this, "Alternative A" was Dominion's proposed plan from the COP. Under it, the wind farm would consist of 202 turbines generating 3 GW of electricity and three offshore substations (OSSs). Turbines would be spaced in a 0.93-by-0.75 nautical mile offset grid pattern with the OSSs placed within rows of the grid. This configuration allows micro-siting of turbines up to 500 feet (which consists of deciding exactly where a turbine is placed within a grid square) to avoid sensitive marine or cultural resources. New onshore infrastructure includes a cable landing location, three onshore export cables between the landing site and a new switching station, and an overhead cable ending at Dominion's existing Fentress Substation where energy would be transferred to the grid. A switching station is an electrical substation with only one voltage level that connect and disconnect power lines within a grid, allowing for the control of electricity flow.

The second alternative, "Alternative B", called for exclusion zones in the lease area to minimize impacts on a fish haven area along the northern boundary and to avoid conflicts with a proposed vessel traffic route in the northwest corner of the lease area. These exclusion zones would result in the loss of eight turbines along the northern boundary and three turbines in the northwest corner. Under this alternative, the wind farm would hold 176 turbines generating up to 14.7 MW each for a total of 2,587 MW in the entire facility. An additional 15 turbines were suggested for removal within the wind farm to account for sensitive cultural and environmental resources on the sea bed. This was one of the two preferable alternatives identified by BOEM.

"Alternative C" was proposed to minimize impacts on offshore benthic habitats and is titled the "Sand Ridge Impact Minimization Alternative". This alternative would be constructed with a similar layout and similar parameters to Alternative B. However, four more turbines would be removed and one more would be relocated to a spare turbine position. These changes would allow the wind farm to avoid impacts on priority sand ridge habitats and shipwrecks while also allowing for the reconfiguration of inter array cabling to reduce seafloor disturbance. Under this alternative, the wind farm would hold 172 turbines combining to form a 2.5 GW facility.

Finally, "Alternative D", included two sub-alternatives, each with different on-land interconnection cable routes, and was titled the "Onshore Habitat Impact Minimization Alternative", focusing on protecting wetlands. This did not modify the COP's offshore layout. However, either sub-alternative could be included with any other analyzed alternative ultimately selected by BOEM. "Alternative D-1" involved a fully overground cabling system and was identified as the second preferred alternative alongside B. This differed from "Alternative D-2" which proposed a mixed cabling system that was partially overhead and partially underground.

Nine more alternatives were developed by BOEM but were not considered reasonable by NEPA standards and thus were not analyzed in depth. Changes in these alternatives included shifting cable corridors, changing construction materials and altering the turbine layout. They were considered unreasonable either due to negligible environmental impacts or impracticality.

=== Record of decision and approvals ===
Following release and review of the Final EIS, the Record of Decision (ROD) for CVOW was released on October 30, 2023, a month after the EIS. The final decision was to approve the project with modifications, requiring that alternative B be adopted for the offshore portion of the project and D-1 be adopted for onshore infrastructure.

In addition to this decision, pursuant to the requirements of the Council on Environmental Quality, the ROD outlines the environmentally preferable alternatives, which in this case were the "No Action" alternative and Alternative C. While blocking CVOW would prevent all the environmental harms identified, BOEM emphasized that it would eventually lead to fossil fuel related projects being developed which would harm Virginia's climate goals, and thus dismisses this alternative. Alternative C is ultimately presented as the most environmentally sound alternative. Despite this, option C was not selected as it would have resulted in significant cost increases and project delays. Alternative B combined with D-1 would allow for an additional 60 MW of power to be generated while maintaining an appropriate level of impact and not increasing costs or causing delays.

In addition to BOEM's final decision, the ROD includes the NMFS's decision to accept the EIS and subsequently issue a Letter of Authorization (LOA) to Dominion for the incidental take of marine mammals during five years of construction. The LOA comes with a range of prescribed mitigation measures including vessel strike avoidance, seasonal moratoriums, sound attenuation and more.

== Finance ==
CVOW differs from most other offshore wind projects because Dominion Energy, the owner and developer, is a state public utility company, as opposed to being a private developer. As a result, Dominion does not need to sign an offtake agreement as private developers must do with state-regulated utilities, hence giving it more flexibility in the development of the project. Specifically, if the costs of the project change due to external factors, Dominion can go through processes to get approval from the Virginia State Corporation Commission to increase the costs for ratepayers that compensate for these changes. This differs from how a private developer can act, as the offtake agreements that they sign force them to adhere to a price for selling electricity to a state utility that is stipulated in their contract. It is estimated that the monthly impact of the entire project on an average ratepayer using 1,000 kilowatt-hours a month will be 43 cents.

Furthermore, in the early stages of the project before the COVID-19 pandemic, Dominion negotiated fixed price contracts with manufacturers, which meant that they were not hard hit by supply chain constraints, heavy inflation and rising interest rates that took place during and after the COVID-19 pandemic. While many wind farms were halted or delayed due to these impacts, CVOW has managed to stay on track and keep prices under control.

In February 2024, Dominion Energy sold a 50% non-controlling interest in CVOW to the investment firm Stonepeak, leaving full operational control with Dominion. Under the terms of the agreement, Dominion received $2.6 billion, which covered approximately 50 percent of project costs up to that point. In addition to this, Stonepeak agreed to cover 50 percent of all future costs. This was an important deal for CVOW with regards to protecting it from future unforeseen cost increases.

In January 2025, CVOW experienced its first cost increase, jumping from the initially proposed $9.8 billion to $10.7 billion. This increase reflects higher network upgrade costs at the point of interconnection with the Virginia grid, which are assigned by PJM Interconnection, the regional grid operator. This was also attributable to higher onshore export cable costs.

== Infrastructure ==
=== Pilot project ===
In October 2020, the pilot phase of the project was completed, consisting of two wind turbines adjacent to the main leasing area generating a total of 12 megawatts (MW). In 2014, the project was awarded US$47 million in grant funding from the Department of Energy (DOE) intended to support renewable energy research. However, in 2016, the DOE pulled funding as Dominion could not guarantee the turbines would be operational before 2020 as initially agreed upon. As a result, the turbines were privately funded by Dominion, which paid the full $300 million in costs. Although owned by Dominion, the construction was led by Danish energy company Ørsted that has significant expertise in offshore wind from projects it has developed in Europe.

Also referred to as a demonstration project, the turbines serve the goals of researching new technologies in offshore wind and developing innovative ways of reducing costs, all while generating an amount of electricity equivalent to that consumed by 3,000 homes. According to BOEM, "the data obtained and lessons learned…will be made publicly available and inform the future production of renewable energy within the adjacent commercial lease area". Since the start of 2021, the project has been operating successfully, paving the way for the full commercial scale wind farm.

=== Offshore wind farm ===
The offshore commercial project will consist of a wind farm organized in a 0.93-by-0.75 nautical mile offset grid pattern in which 176 wind turbine generators will be installed. Because of the modifications from alternative B-2 in the Environmental Impact Statement, parts of the grid will be empty to preserve environmental resources. Dominion selected Siemens-Gamesa as its preferred turbine supplier, opting for its SG 14-222 DD turbines that have a 14.6 MW capacity. These turbines have three 108 meter blades (222 meter rotor diameter) and can produce energy over an approximately 30-year lifespan. The offset grid configuration allows for micro siting of turbines by up to 500 feet within their grid squares, which consists of minimally altering their position in order to avoid sensitive marine or cultural resources. The turbines will be fixed into the seabed by monopiles that installed by pile driving into the bed. The monopiles are up to 83 meters long and 10 meters in diameter, weighing 1,500 tons. These components are being purchased from German industrial manufacturer EEW Group. As of October 2024 (a year into construction), 78 monopiles were installed, after which construction was suspended until May 2025 to avoid disrupting migratory paths of the North Atlantic Right Whale.

The windfarm will feature three offshore substations (OSSs) that will be placed between turbines within the grid and will collect and bundle together the electricity produced. Electricity generated by turbines will be transferred to the OSSs via 66-kilovolt (kV) inter-array cables that are being buried between one and five meters beneath the seabed. A total of 480 kilometers of inter-array cables are being installed. The OSSs will be installed atop pile jacket foundations and the materials for the foundations and the stations themselves will be purchased from South Korean manufacturer CS Wind Offshore and Danish manufacturer SEMCO Maritime. From the OSSs, electricity will be transported to land by nine 230 kV buried offshore export cable with a combined total length of 587 kilometers.

=== Grid interconnection ===
To bring electricity on land and get it connected to the grid, offshore export cables will come onshore at a landing station at the State Military Reserve in Virginia Beach. From there, nine underground export cables will transfer electricity to a new switching station currently under construction at Harpers Road within the Naval Air Station Oceana. There, the cables will transition from underground to three overhead 230 kilovolt lines that will travel span 13.7 miles (22.0 km) to Dominion's existing Fentress Substation that is currently undergoing upgrades to accommodate this new project. This is where electricity generated by CVOW will be connected to Virginia's electrical grid. This layout aligns with alternative D-1 from the Environmental Impact Statement.

=== Ports and vessels ===
Another notable part of CVOW's offshore infrastructure is the construction of the first Jones Act-compliant offshore wind turbine installation vessel (Charybdis), which is designed to transport the turbine components to the lease area from land. The Jones Act is a federal statute passed in 1920 that regulates maritime commerce in U.S. waters and mandates that goods being transported by water between U.S. ports be carried on ships constructed in the U.S., owned by U.S. companies or citizens and are crewed by U.S. citizens or permanent residents. The act has been a major barrier to offshore wind construction in the U.S. as no offshore wind vessels other than Charybdis fit these criteria. Charybdis is therefore significant both for the ease of transportation during CVOW's construction, as well as for the growth of a domestic supply chain for offshore wind in the U.S. as a whole.

The vessel will measure 427 feet (130 m) in length and was built using 14,000 short tons (12,000 long tons; 13,000 Mg) of domestically produced steel, largely sourced from Alabama, North Carolina, and West Virginia. Construction of Charybdis took place in Brownsville, Texas, requiring 1,200 workers, and she was successfully launched to sea in April 2024. The vessel began sea trials at the Seatrium AmFELS shipyard in Brownsville in February 2025, and it is expected to be sent to Portsmouth Marine Terminal where it will support CVOW.

In order to further support offshore construction, $250 million has also been invested into upgrading the Portsmouth Marine Terminal 36.855°N 76.325°W where components of the offshore wind farm will be assembled and loaded onto vessels to be brought to the lease area. The port is being upgraded by Swedish construction company Skanska. Construction began in July 2022 and is expected to be completed by the end of 2025. The upgrade will consist of redeveloping approximately 72 acres (0.113 sq mi; 0.29 km^{2}) of the 287-acre port, and will focus on improving the port's wharf. Dominion Energy reached an agreement to lease a portion of the terminal for 10 years which will comprise construction and early years of operations. In December 2021, the US Department of Transportation awarded a $20 million grant to support the terminal upgrades.

=== Construction timeline ===
Activity	Expected timing
Switching Station Construction	2023 Q4 - 2025 Q2
Onshore Substation Upgrade Construction	2023 Q4 - 2025 Q2
Onshore Export and Interconnection Cable Installation	2023 Q4 - 2025 Q3
Monopile and Transition Piece Transport and Onshore Staging	2023 Q4 - 2026 Q1
Scour Protection Pre-Installation	2024 Q1 - 2024 Q4
Offshore Export and Interconnection Cable Installation	2024 Q1 - 2025 Q2
Monopile Installation	2024 Q2 - 2025 Q4
Transition Piece Installation	2024 Q2 - 2026 Q1
Offshore Substation Installation	2024 Q3 - 2025 Q3
Scour Protection Post-Installation	2025 Q1 - 2025 Q4
Commissioning	2025 Q1 - 2027 Q2
Inter-Array Cable Installation	2025 Q2 - 2026 Q2
Wind Turbine Generator Pre-Assembly and Installation	2025 Q2 - 2027 Q2

== Benefits and concerns ==
=== Socio-economic ===
==== Jobs and revenue ====
The construction and operation of CVOW is projected to bring about a range of economic benefits to the Hampton Roads metropolitan area, namely through the creation of jobs and revenue both directly related to the project and indirectly through increased activity in the whole economy, as well as through generation of considerable tax revenue. A study by Magnum Economics, a Virginia-based economic consulting firm, estimated that in the development and construction phase of the project (2020–2026), economic benefits will include 900 direct and indirect jobs annually (60 percent in Hampton Roads) that encompass $57 million in pay and benefits, $143 million in economic output and $2 million in local government revenue. On top of this, an additional $3 million would be generated in Virginia state tax revenues. The study estimates that once completed, operation and maintenance will support 1,100 direct and indirect jobs in Hampton Roads totaling $82 million in pay and benefits. CVOW will spur $210 million in annual economic output generating close to $6 million in local government revenue and $5 million in state tax revenue.

In order to support workers involved with the project, Dominion formed a partnership with the North America's Building Trades Union in September 2021 to "identify opportunities to utilize union labor on CVOW". The partnership includes commitments to employ locals and when possible hire and train workers from disadvantaged communities and veterans. Many of the jobs created are a direct result of Dominion's efforts to develop the US's domestic supply chain for offshore wind, including the construction of an offshore wind and defense industry center for operations and logistics that will create up to 500 jobs and an operational base in Virginia Beach.

==== Community benefits ====
Dominion has also supported the Hamptons Road area through community and philanthropic initiatives. The Dominion Energy Charitable Foundation has donated over $15 million to local organizations in Hampton Roads involved in areas such as education, healthcare and community development. In addition to this, Dominion has directly given around $500,000 to support social justice nonprofit organizations in Hampton Roads since 2020. In the same year, they pledged $2.75 million to support Hampton University and Norfolk State University, two historically black universities.

Politically, the project is backed by both political parties in the Virginia state government and has garnered widespread support of local communities, the commercial marine industry, as well as environmental and labor groups.

=== Climate and environment ===
CVOW is core to climate and clean energy goals set out at the state and federal levels. The project is a central initiative for the state of Virginia's 2020 Virginia Clean Economy Act which was passed by the Virginia General Assembly and mandated that Dominion build or purchase offshore wind facilities with a total capacity of 5.2 GW by the end of 2035. CVOW will ultimately be pivotal in helping Virginia reach its goal of 100 percent clean energy by 2050, helping to decrease greenhouse gas emissions as offshore wind energy is a zero-carbon resource. Once operations begin, Dominion expects that the wind farm will avoid approximately 2.2 million tons of carbon dioxide emissions annually. At the federal level, former President Joe Biden set out ambitious targets for renewable energy to tackle the United States' contribution to climate change, including a reduction of total greenhouse gas emissions of 50% by 2030 compared to 2005 levels and 100% carbon free electricity generation by 2035. CVOW is one of many large scale renewable energy projects that are central to attaining these goals, however, the path towards these targets has become less clear with the election of current President Donald Trump, who has expressed contempt towards his predecessor's climate initiatives.

While CVOW certainly will bring about important benefits for the climate, the project has also brought about environmental concerns. The Final EIS for CVOW outlined 19 "resources" for which the impacts were evaluated. BOEM determined each to receive either "negligible", "minor", "moderate" or "major" impacts. The largest environmental concerns pertained to commercial fisheries, marine mammals, navigation and vessel traffic and wetlands.

Impacts on marine mammals were classified from moderate to major. Mysticetes, odontocetes and pinnipeds were found to be at risk of harm from underwater construction noise which could disrupt communication and behavior, with North Atlantic Right Whale being found to be particularly at risk. This is due to their low numbers making the whole population vulnerable to each mortality. Increase in vessel traffic from importing materials and construction (with use of up to 73 vessels operating a day) were determined to heighten the risk of boat collisions and accidental releases of harmful chemicals, as well increasing emissions from navigation vessels. A key mitigation measure to reduce the risk and impact of vessel strikes on marine life is the mandate for all wind-related vessels to travel at a maximum speed of 10 knots. On top of this, vessels will be required to maintain a minimum distance of 330 feet (100 meters) between one another. If a whale is spotted, the vessel must reduce its speed, shift its engine to neutral, and cannot reengage the engine until the whale has moved outside the vessel's path and beyond 330 feet. If a sea turtle is spotted within 330 feet, vessels must decrease their speed to 4 knots until a safe distance is reestablished. Furthermore, vessels must avoid visible jellyfish aggregations where turtles are often found. These measures apply only to vessels working on CVOW, while other vessels in the area can travel at higher speeds. To further mitigate these impacts, Dominion agreed for its offshore workers to partake in training with the National Marine Fisheries Services that will teach them how to look out for and identify marine mammals in the way of vessels. Vessels must have a trained lookout posted on the boat, which is particularly important for sea turtles that are frequently found at the water's surface around the wind farm. Lookouts will be equipped with high tech binoculars, and assisted by thermal cameras that will be installed on vessels. Training will is also being provided for the appropriate handling of turtles should they be found tangled or trapped.

Construction workers and operators are additionally required to undergo training to learn best practices for mitigating the release of trash and harmful substances from vessels into the ocean. Moreover, to minimize the impact on sea turtles and fish from intense electromagnetic fields coming from underwater cables, Dominion will use electrical shielding.

Concerns for the North Atlantic Right Whale have been particularly high among the public. In March 2024, three conservative non-profits, The Heartland Institute, Committee of Constructive Tomorrow, and the National Legal and Policy Center, filed a lawsuit against CVOW. The suit claimed that BOEM's biological opinion violates the Endangered Species Act, and linked recent whale deaths to noise disruption from CVOW construction. Ultimately, no evidence connected the any offshore wind development activities to whale deaths so federal judges denied the request. CVOW has engaged in mitigation strategies to minimize potential impacts on whale populations, including by halting construction between November and May when Northern Right Whales migrate through the area, and by creating bubble curtains underwater around turbine installation sites to reduce noise when monopiles are being driven into the ground. The three lawsuits did not impact the project's timeline.

The EIS classified navigation and impacts on vessel traffic widely from minor to major. Beyond impacting marine life, the increased heavy vessel traffic and anchoring disrupts navigation routes for other vessels that must bypass the wind farm area. Increased anchoring by CVOW vessels was reported to increase the risk of sea bed disturbance.

The risk to commercial fisheries stems from space-use conflict, navigational hazards, gear loss causing entanglements and ecosystem disruption due to construction and new infrastructure impacting fish populations. These risks have been classified to range from negligible to major. In order to mitigate these dangers, alternative B was selected from the EIS that called for an exclusion zone in the lease area that consisted of an important fishery. Fishing is actually expected to increase within and around the wind farm as a result of the new ecosystems that turbine bottoms create that promote fish aggregation. Because of this, Dominion is implementing a mitigation measure of monitoring the discarding of fishing gear around its turbines. The results of this must be reported to BOEM. Dominion will also engage in monitoring activities to track the populations of various fish species in the area. Part of Dominion's engagement with the fishing community includes a fisheries compensation program through which fisherman are paid for lost income associated with CVOW.

Currently, CVOW is planning to develop its onshore infrastructure partly within or adjacent to wetlands, having moderate to major impacts according to the EIS. Onshore sites near the North Landing River, Pocaty River and West Nest Creek are particularly at risk from permanent changes to the ecosystem. Further risk is attributed to the accidental release of fuel, solid waste and chemicals from construction and infrastructure into the ecosystem. Excavation, rutting, compaction, mixing of the topsoil are also expected. The alternative cable systems proposed by D-1 and D-2 have similar impacts on the wetlands, providing no potential alleviation of such impacts, however D-1 was found to be slightly less impactful.

=== Cultural resources ===
In addition to environmental impacts, the EIS also investigated impacts to cultural resources, with classifications from moderate to major. Dominion identified 24 terrestrial archaeological resources and 31 marine archaeological resources within or adjacent to the proposed disruptive activity. Construction of foundations and inter-array cables and dredging in the ocean disturb the seafloor, and increase risk of accidental releases of harmful chemicals, both of which could damage archaeological resources. In order to mitigate these impacts, the EIS describes how Dominion will comply with an agreement between BOEM and the state of Virginia that mandates the setup of "protective buffers" around sensitive underwater cultural resources. Furthermore, the EIS notes that wind farms are intrusive visual elements, altering historic property views. Importantly, because of CVOW's distance from shore, it can only be seen from land under certain conditions from specific locations, and therefore has not received significant opposition from the public on these grounds. In order to minimize potential visibility, Dominion is adopting the mitigation measure of using a specific shade of paint on its turbines that blends in better with the horizon.

The construction of on-land infrastructure, namely the high voltage transmission lines, has brought up problems related to the use of private land. Dominion identified 68 properties through which it would be necessary for the line to pass through or from which lines would be visible, of which four denied requests for property use. Despite being offered compensation and attempts at negotiation by CVOW, these properties stood firm, leading Dominion to successfully filing for eminent domain which allowed for the construction of transmission infrastructure to be built on these properties. One example is the Walton Funeral Home, who turned down $20,000 in compensation, expressing worries about the views and grounds space that will be affected.

=== Stakeholder perspectives and engagement ===
Throughout the planning, construction, and installation of the project, Dominion has engaged extensively with implicated local stakeholders including local communities, Native American tribes, and a local historian in the state, in order to minimize disruptiveness. These community interactions helped developers identify the least disruptive pathway along which they could build the transmission line carrying energy from the landing station to the grid. Priorities were to maximize the use of public land and minimize impacts to private property, residential areas, the environment as well as historical and cultural resources. In addition to these communities, Dominion has worked closely with the maritime community, which consists largely of the area's fishing industry. Dominion developed and abides by a "Fisheries Communications Plan" according to which it engages in ongoing discussions and meetings with members of the community to keep them informed on their activities and hear concerns and questions. CVOW's Marine Affairs Team conducts periodic presentations and roundtable discussions, as well as publishing weekly updates on construction and planned activities in the U.S. Coast Guard Local Notice to Mariners.

== Future outlook ==
As of February 2025, the project is 50 percent complete and remains on track for completion at the end of 2026. With this first project nearing completion, Dominion is in the process of developing two new projects to further increase Virginia's offshore wind capacity. As of March 2026, the project is producing and delivering power to the grid. In July 2024, Dominion came to an agreement with Avangrid, the subsidiary of Spanish electric utility company Iberdrola, to purchase the Kitty Hawk North Wind offshore wind lease area off the coast of North Carolina. The purchase of the 40,000 acre plot came at a cost of $117 million and was officially closed after approval from BOEM in October 2024. Dominion has named this project "CVOW-South" and intends to build a wind farm with an 800 MW capacity. In addition to this, Dominion is looking to purchase another lease area directly East of CVOW (named "CVOW-East") that it hopes will generate 4 GW.

Politically, the project is backed by both political parties in the Virginia state government and has garnered the support of local communities, the commercial marine industry, as well as environmental and labor groups. Worries for the prospects of offshore wind began to emerge in 2025 with the inauguration of Donald Trump to the presidency, who has declared intent to prevent future development of the industry. While President Trump's January 2025 executive order to halt leasing and permitting for offshore wind projects is unlikely to impact the completion of CVOW, it puts the future projects of Dominion under threat. CVOW has already received all necessary permits and licenses, which is why it is likely to be safe from the executive order. However, potential risk still remains given that the executive orders also call for a review of existing leases.

== See also ==
- Wind power in the United States
- List of offshore wind farms in the United States
- List of offshore wind farms
- Energy Policy Act of 2005
