= Virginia Clean Economy Act =

The Virginia Clean Economy Act (HB 1526 and SB 851) was signed into law by Governor Ralph Northam in 2020. The bill establishes a renewable energy portfolio standard (RPS), which mandates that the two utilities in the state, Dominion Energy Virginia and Appalachian Electric Power, produce 100 percent renewable electricity by 2045 and 2050, respectively. It also sets energy efficiency standards. Utilities that fail to comply with the RPS will pay into a fund that, in-part, goes toward training historically disadvantaged communities for employment in the clean energy sector. As it was originally written, the bill would have included joining RGGI (the Regional Greenhouse Gas Initiative) of Northeastern US states, but that provision was pulled out and passed in a later bill.

== Passing the bill ==
The Virginia Clean Economy Act (VCEA) was introduced to the VA State House by Representative Rip Sullivan and the VA State Senate by Senator Jennifer McClellan. Altogether, the VCEA had 31 patrons in the House and Senate, combined. At the time of the bill's passing, Virginia was one of 15 states to have a Democratic majority in the state House, Senate, and Governorship. It ultimately passed with 53-Y, 45-N, and 1-A in the House and 22-Y to 18-N in the Senate.

=== Environmental coalition ===
Virginia is a state physically threatened by climate change in its eastern coast, and economically threatened by climate action in its western mountains. Gaining support from a wide range of interests therefore required diverse engagement strategies. The Sierra Club, Appalachian Voices, Chesapeake Climate Action Network, Advanced Energy Economy, Southern Environmental Law Center, and other environmental organizations came together as a coalition to gain grassroots support as well as technically write the bill. In early 2020, partner organizations organized a lobby day, and a report commissioned by Advanced Energy Economy informed the structure of the bill.

=== Opinions on the bill ===
There is some opposition to the bill from both the political Right and Left. There is a concern that the bill will increase rate-payer electricity prices, in large part due to a last-minute bill change, which raised the price of Dominion’s offshore wind project—a price that will fall on rate payers. A report from Advanced Energy Economy, however, estimated that over the course of the bill’s life, Virginia families will actually gain $3,500 and that several thousand jobs will be netted.

== Politics ==
Parts of the state are threatened by sea level rise and environmental justice concerns, yet it also has strong ties to the fossil fuel industry. In the years before the bill passed, several climate activism organizations built grassroots support for clean energy such that when the legislative bodies and governorship were held by Democrats in 2020, the grassroots base could quickly mobilize to pass a renewable energy standard. It was the nation's first legally binding, 100% renewable energy standard passed by any state, but the 2021 election of Republican Glenn Youngkin as Virginia's governor and the return of the state House of Delegates to the Republican Party raised questions for the bill's longevity. Given that the state's senate remains in Democratic control, market forces are pushing for renewable development, and strong regulations protect the bill, there is little the governor would be able to do to derail the clean energy progress in the state.
