= Wind power in Maryland =

Electricity from wind in one U.S. state

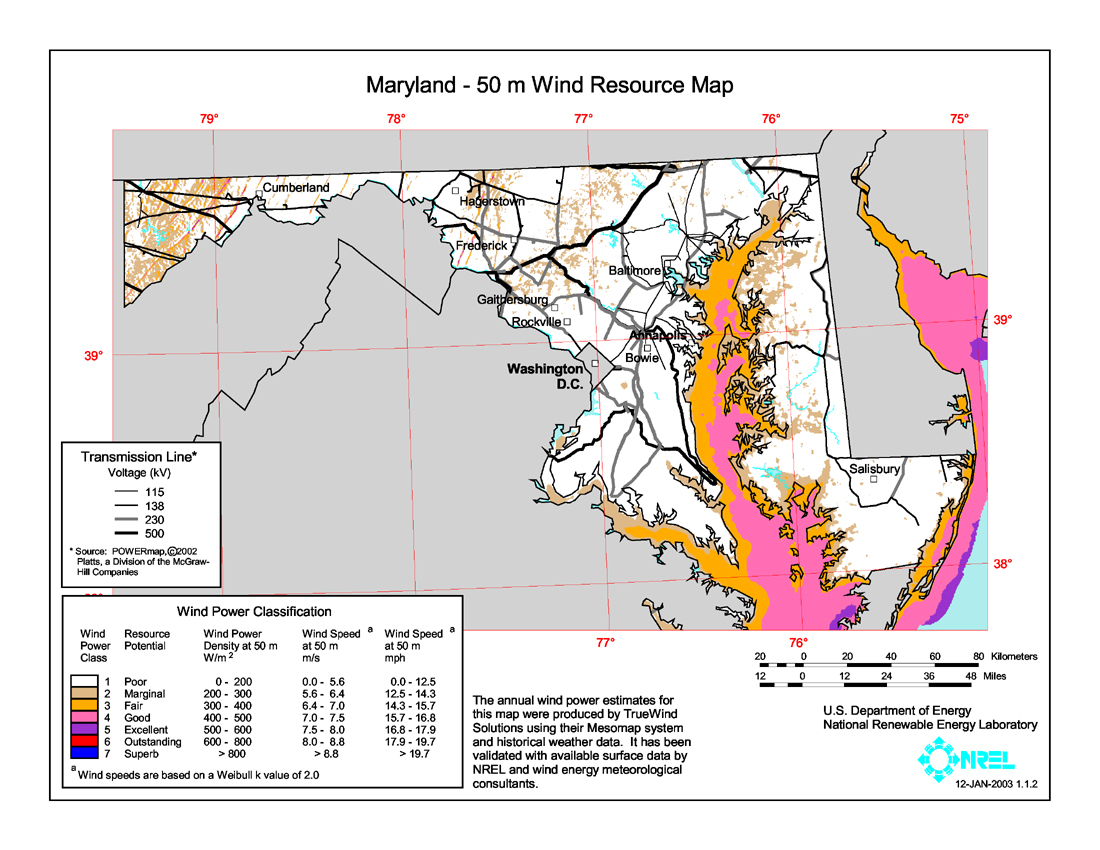
2003 US Department of Energy wind resource map of Maryland

Wind power in Maryland, which has land-based and offshore resources, is in the early stages of development. As of 2016, Maryland had 191 megawatts (MW) of wind powered electricity generating capacity, responsible for 1.4% of in-state generated electricity. Two offshore wind farm projects that will supply wind-generated power to the state are underway.

The Maryland Offshore Wind Energy Act of 2013 encouraged the development of up to 500 MW of offshore wind capacity, authorized $1.7 billion in subsidies for the next 20 years for Maryland offshore wind development. In 2023, the Promoting Offshore Wind Energy Resources Act set a goal of 8.5 gigawatts of offshore wind, up from 2 GW. It also calls for shared transmission infrastructure, reducing costs for projects.

Governor Wes Moore signed the Promoting Offshore Wind Energy Resources (POWER) Act in April 2023, committing the state to a goal of generating 8.5 GW of wind energy by 2031.

== Land-based projects ==
- Criterion Wind Project
- Great Bay Wind Energy Center is a proposed wind farm that will utilize coastal winds in Somerset County. The $200-million, 150-megawatt facility is being undertaken by Texas-based Pioneer Green Energy, which proposes to initially build 25 599 ft (183 m) wind turbines. A second phase would add another 25 turbines. A single turbine has been proposed as a demo to overcome public adversion to the project.

== Offshore projects ==
An area of 94 square nautical miles (79,706 acres) approximately 10–30 miles off the Maryland coast has been identified as suitable for offshore wind development. This was split into two (north and south) lease areas and auctioned by the Bureau of Ocean Energy Management (BOEM) on August 19, 2014. The Maryland Wind Energy Area is located, at its closest point, about 10 nautical miles offshore Ocean City in the Outer Continental Shelf of Atlantic Ocean, and has the potential to support between 850 and 1450 megawatts of commercial wind generation.

| Wind farm | Offshore BOEM wind energy lease area | | | Coordinates | Capacity (MW) | Developer/utility | Turbines | States | Regulatory agency | Refs |
|---|---|---|---|---|---|---|---|---|---|---|
| MarWin | Offshore Maryland; OCS-A 0490 | 17 nautical miles -20 miles (32 km) east of Ocean City (MA) | 79,707 acres (32,256 ha) | | 248 MW | US Wind | 32 | MD | Maryland PSC | |
| Skipjack | Offshore Delaware; OCS-A 0519 | 16.9 nautical miles-19.5 miles (31.4 km) from Delaware coast north of Maryland WEA | 26,332 acres (10,656 ha) | | 966 MW | Ørsted | 10 12MW GE Haliade-X | MD | Maryland PSC | |

=== MarWin ===
In 2014, US Wind, a subsidiary of Italy-based Renexia SpA, won the auction for a 25-year lease for both areas issued by the BOEM with a bid of $8.7 million for areas. Development of their project is hindered by the uncertainty of government direction since the state legislature and local governments are considering banning certain areas. As of the summer of 2016, US Wind had completed underwater surveys of the potential sites about a dozen miles off the coast of Maryland, and was submitting plans for environmental review by the year's end.

=== Skipjack ===
The 966 MW Skipjack Wind Farm off Delaware's coast was planned for commissioning in 2022, but wasdelayed to 2026. It will use Haliade-X turbines, with rotors 220 meters long, made in Cherbourg, France.

Ørsted U.S. Offshore Wind will partner with a logistics center in Maryland to create a 50-acre staging center for offshore wind manufacturing, capable of servicing projects up and down the East Coast. The developer will work with Tradepoint Atlantic, based in Port of Baltimore, to develop a staging area for on-land assembly, storage and loading out into deep waters.

The Port of Paulsboro on the Delaware River in New Jersey could become the production site for the enormous concrete foundations for turbines.

Ørsted has proposed using 1.5 acres of land at Fenwick Island State Park in Delaware as a transmission point.

== State and local opportunities ==
Counties and organizations in Maryland are utilizing state government programs to begin wind power generation, and to research better locations for wind power across the state.

According to the Maryland Energy Administration (MEA), energy generated from wind turbines accounts for 1.4% of all energy generated by the state (2016). The MEA offers programs in education, investments, and grants for wind power production in the state.

Maryland gives counties and companies opportunities for wind power generation like MEA grants and programs. These grants are also used for developing better wind power generation technology and outlining better places to build wind power facilities, like those from University of Maryland, Baltimore County. Wind energy has a positive/neutral perception by 70-90% of people in the US, Maryland is no different. There is a large capacity within the state for wind power generation. Better public perception and increased technology development in the last 30 years would allow for greater expansion of wind energy production.

=== Baltimore County ===
There are many studies that focus on Baltimore County. They tend towards smaller grid solutions rather than large scale national grid wind connections. A smaller grid solution is feasible for Baltimore county as the technology of smaller scale wind turbines improves. A 2011 analysis published on the usage of Baltimore's ports for the Skipjack Wind Farm supports and gives an outline for the expansion of wind energy in the region.

Preliminary studies for the effectiveness of wind energy generation in Baltimore County have shown that there are increased wind speeds in the winter months due to the overhead jet stream.

== Statistics ==
Maryland wind generation capacity by year
Megawatts of wind capacity

== See also ==
- Atlantic Wind Connection
- PJM Interconnection
- List of power stations in Maryland
- Solar power in Maryland
- Wind power in Delaware
- List of offshore wind farms in the United States
