= Wind power in Virginia =

Electricity from wind in one U.S. state

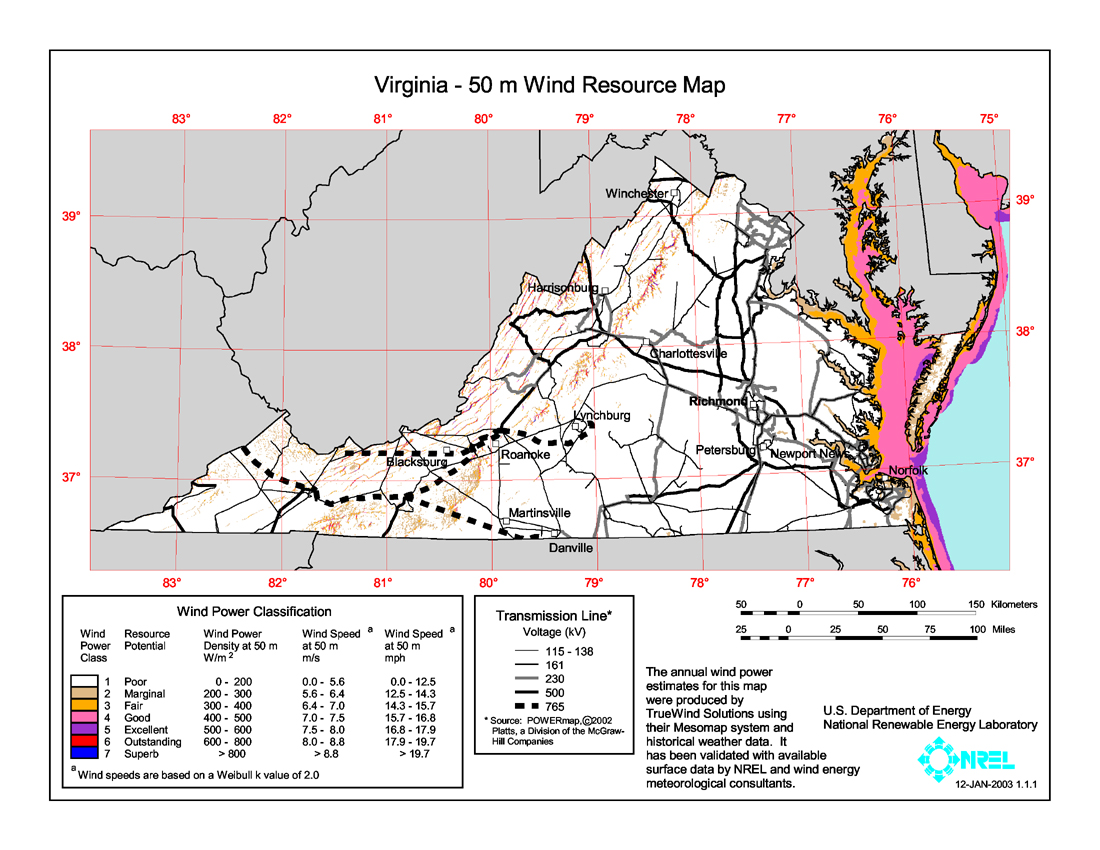
2003 US Department of Energy wind resource map of Virginia

Wind power in Virginia is in the early stages of development. In March 2015, Virginia became the first state in the United States to receive a wind energy research lease to build and operate offshore wind turbines in federal waters. Virginia has no utility scale wind farms.

The Virginia Clean Economy Act of 2020 directs the construction of 16,100 MW of solar power and onshore wind and up to 5,200 MW of offshore wind by 2035, bringing the state's utility-delivered power to 100% renewable energy by 2045.

== Wind Development Authority ==
The Virginia Offshore Wind Development Authority was created by 2010 legislation to facilitate, coordinate, and support development of the offshore wind energy industry, offshore wind energy projects, and supply chain vendors and to ways to encourage and expedite offshore wind industry development. It attempts to collect metocean and environmental data, identify regulatory and administrative barriers, work with government agencies to upgrade port and logistic facilities and sites, and ensure development is compatible with other ocean uses and avian/marine wildlife.

== Wind for Schools ==
Sponsored by the Department of Energy, the Wind for Schools program has installed small scale wind turbines for educational use at schools throughout state to encourages the incorporation of renewable energy education into the K-12 science curriculum through the Virginia Center for Wind at James Madison University and built by Baker Renewable Energy. The first went up at Northumberland Middle and High School at Heathsville. Other locations include Luray High School and Chesapeake High School. In 2012 turbines were installed at Central High School in Woodstock and Thomas Harrison Middle School in Harrisonburg.

== Rocky Forge Wind ==
Rocky Forge Wind was announced in 2015 and was planned to be operational by 2017; delays have set back the projected opening.

== Coastal Virginia Offshore Wind ==
The Virginia Offshore Wind Technology Advancement Project (VOWTAP) is a program to establish offshore wind farms in the Atlantic Ocean off the coast of Virginia. In May 2014, Dominion Virginia Power was awarded $47 million from the United States Department of Energy (DOE) to help fund the construction of a 12-megawatt demonstration project, consisting of two 6-megawatt offshore wind turbines. It intended to have them in full operation in 2017, but postponed the project since the single bid for construction was too high. Some exploratory boring off the coast has taken place. It was later renamed Coastal Virginia Offshore Wind (CVOW).

Wind farm	Offshore BOEM wind energy lease area			States	Coordinates	Capacity (MW)	Completion year	Turbines	Developer/utility	Regulatory agency	Refs
Coastal Virginia Offshore Wind - Pilot Project	Offshore Virginia; OCS-A 0497	25 nautical miles east of Cape Henry (VA)	2,135 acres (864 ha)	VA	36°53′30″N 75°29′30″W	12	2020	2 x 6MW; Siemens Gamesa SWT-6.0-154	Ørsted; Dominion Energy	Virginia Department of Mines Minerals and Energy (DMME); BOEM	

== See also ==
- Solar power in Virginia
- Wind power in the United States
- List of offshore wind farms in the United States
- Block Island Wind Farm
- Cape Wind
- Fisherman's Energy
- Atlantic Wind Connection
