= Wind power in New Jersey =

Electricity from wind in one U.S. state

Wind power in New Jersey is in the early stages of development. New Jersey has just six wind turbines, all land based, but the state has plans to develop several major offshore wind projects on the continental shelf of the Atlantic Ocean off the southern Jersey Shore. Legislation has been enacted to support the industry through economic incentives and to permit wind turbines on existing piers.

In October 2010, the North American Offshore Wind Conference was held in Atlantic City, site of the US's first on-shore coastal facility. New Jersey is part of the Atlantic Offshore Wind Energy Consortium. As of 2013, 9MW were produced by wind power.

Despite incentives to spur the industry in the state, development initially lagged with the cancellation of the planned Fisherman's Energy offshore wind project. In 2018, New Jersey Governor Phil Murphy signed an executive order to revive subsidies for wind power in the state. In September 2018, the state began to solicit bids for projects offshore. In June 2019, the state awarded a contract for a wind farm 15 miles off Atlantic City. to Ørsted US Offshore Wind for Ocean Wind. In November 2019 Murphy signed an executive order which established a wind power target of 7,500 MW by 2035. He increased this goal to 11,000 MW by 2040 in September 2022. In July 2021, the New Jersey Board of Public Utilities (BPU) approved two projects which would bring the state's committed windpower capacity to over 3,000 MW. The BPU announced a third solicitation for 1,200–4,000 MW in December 2022 and awarded contracts for two projects with 3,742 MW in January 2024.

== Potential ==
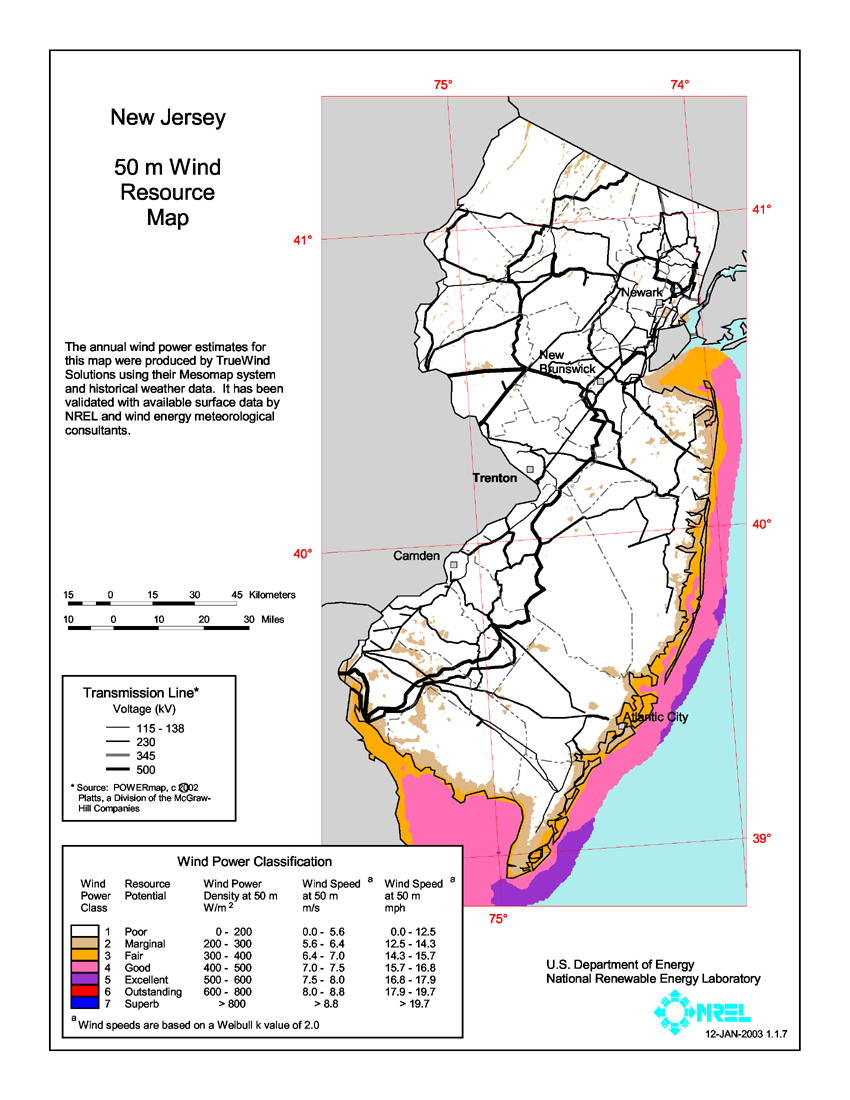
Wind farms will be built off the Jersey Shore.

A 2004 study commissioned by NJ BPU concluded that there is significant wind potential along the coast.

New Jersey has the potential to generate 373 GWh/year from 132 MW of 80 m high wind turbines or 997 GWh/year from 349 MW of 100 m high wind turbines located onshore as well as 430,000 GWh/year from 102,000 MW of offshore wind turbines. New Jersey used 76,759 GWh in 2011.

While less susceptible than areas in southern states, hurricanes could be a threat to wind turbines in the state.

== Government interest and incentives ==
=== State grants for meteorological stations ===
In 2009, the New Jersey's Board of Public Utilities awarded grants of up to $4 million to Garden State Offshore Energy, Fisherman's Energy and Bluewater Wind to undertake research of offshore meteorological conditions. The grant to Garden State Offshore Energy was used to install an offshore meteorological buoy to measure wind speeds and weather and wave conditions off the coast. Garden State Offshore Energy is a joint venture between Deepwater Wind and PSEG Renewable Generation.

=== Offshore Wind Economic Development Act ===
On August 19, 2010, Governor Christie signed the Offshore Wind Economic Development Act, which provides for financial incentives and tax credits to support offshore wind projects. However, Board of Public Utilities, which is charged with implementing key aspects of the legislation, did not finalize all of the regulations necessary to carry out the policy during the Christie administration.

Governor Murphy directed the BPU to implement the Act in 2018. Offshore wind projects are eligible to be awarded Offshore Renewable Energy Certificates (ORECs) for each megawatt-hour of electricity produced. The value of the OREC can vary with each project's contract; Ocean Wind II will receive $84.03/MWh.

=== BOEM offshore leases in federal waters ===
On April 20, 2011, the federal Bureau of Ocean Energy Management (BOEM) issued "The New Jersey Call for Information and Nominations – Commercial Leasing for Wind Power on the Outer Continental Shelf Offshore New Jersey". The BOEM is responsible for leasing areas of the Outer Continental Shelf which are under federal jurisdiction for energy resource utilization. This Call for information and nominations requested public input regarding the development of offshore wind projects in a designated Wind Energy Area (WEA) located offshore New Jersey. The Call also sought nominations from project developers of areas within the WEA that should be put up for auction for project development. The BOEM received eleven such nominations, and the entire WEA was proposed for development by one or more developers.

In July 2014, the federal Department of the Interior and the BOEM proposed sale of leases for nearly 344,000 acres (139,000 ha) covering an area about 7.000 nautical miles (12,964 m) off the coast of Atlantic City. The area would be divided into two leases, known as the North Area and the South Area. Sales of leases began in November 2015; the leases were allotted to RES America Developments and US Wind. They were later sold, including to EDF Renewables and Ørsted US Offshore Wind.

== Existing facilities ==
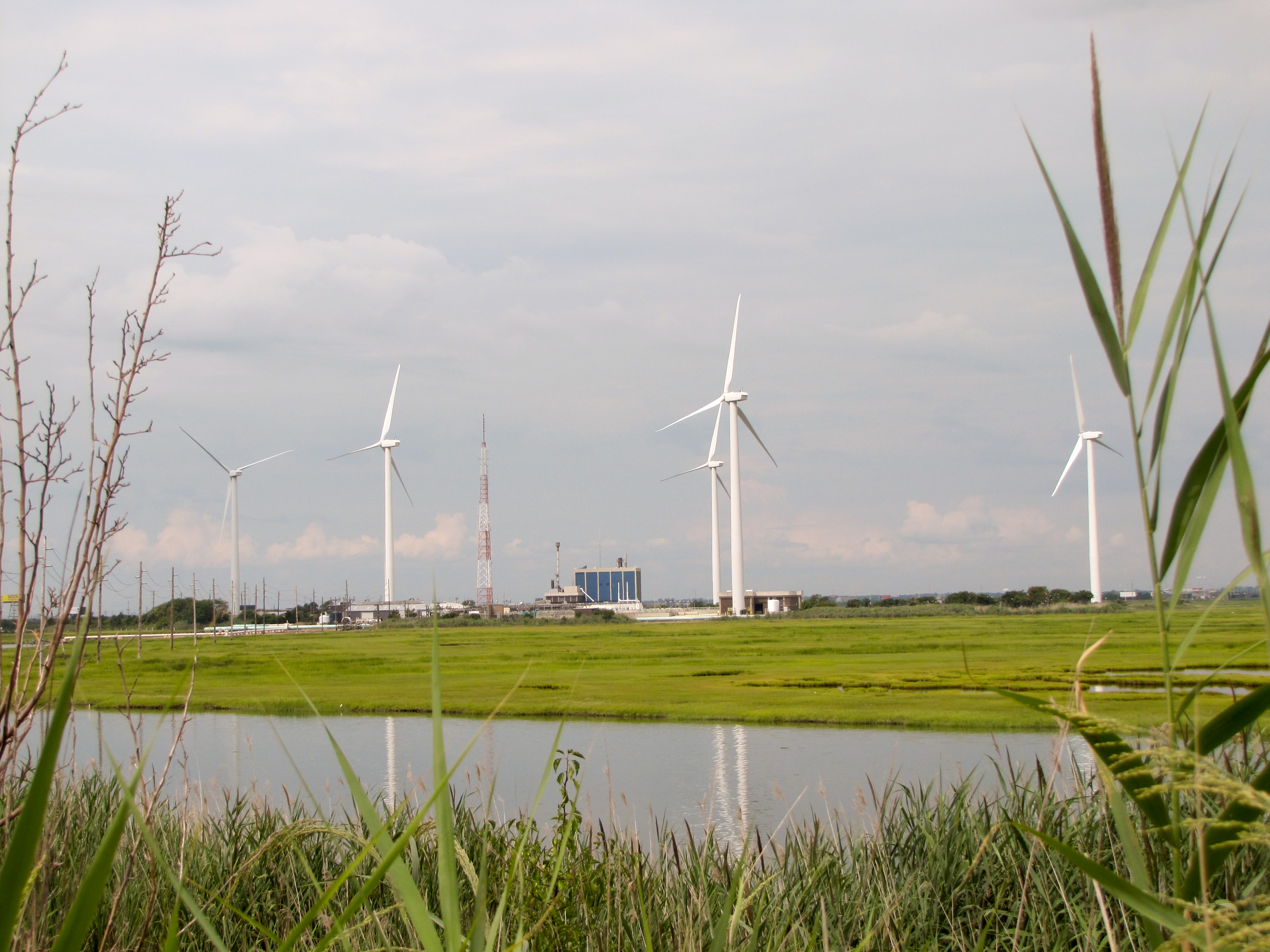
Jersey-Atlantic is the first coastal wind farm in the US.

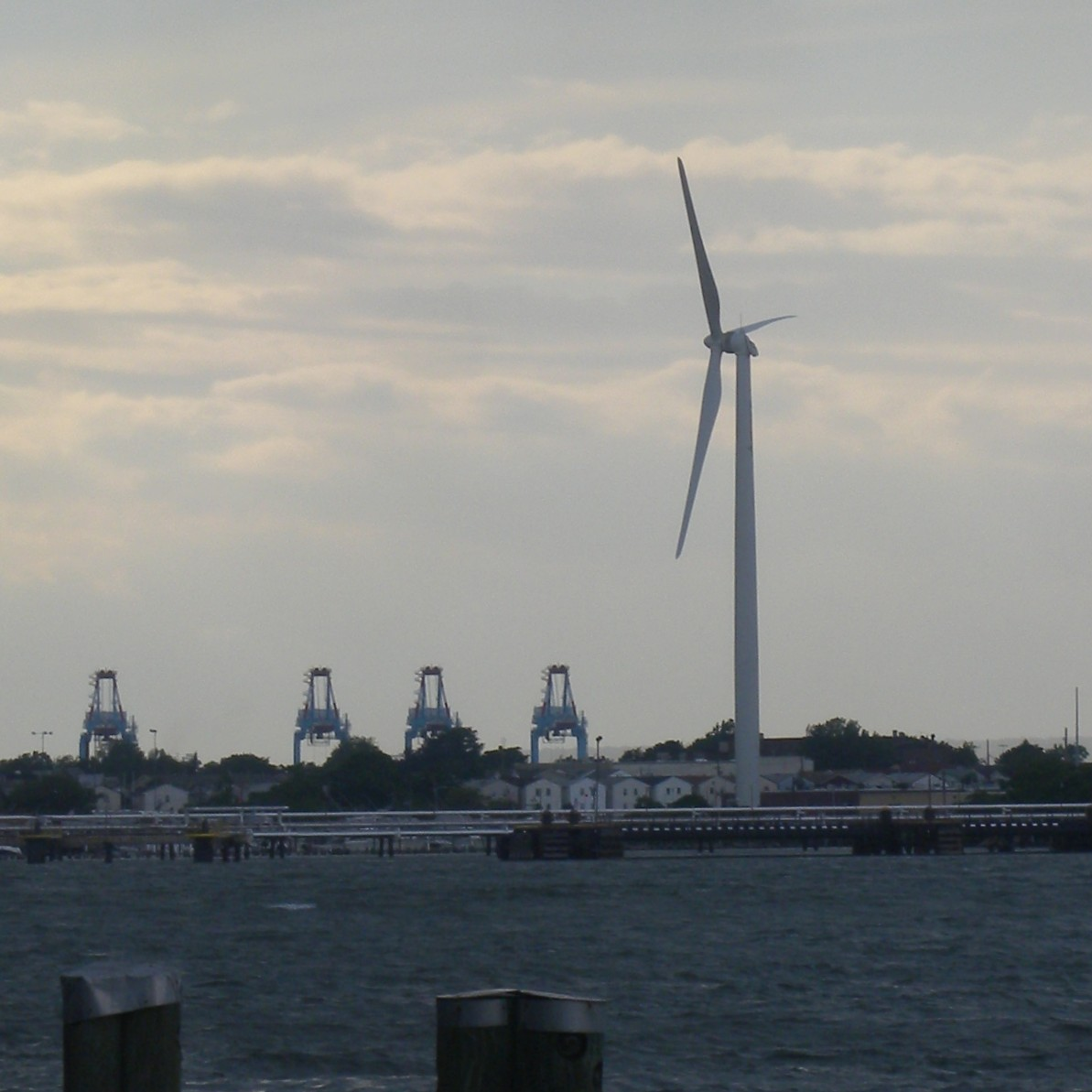
Bayonne

=== Jersey Atlantic Wind Farm ===
Jersey-Atlantic Wind Farm, opened in 2005 in Atlantic City, is the first coastal wind farm in the United States. In October 2010, North American Offshore Wind Conference was held in the city and included tours of the facility and potential sites for further development. In February 2011, the state passed legislation permitting the construction of wind turbines along pre-existing piers, such as the Steel Pier.

=== Bayonne Municipal Utilities Authority ===
The Bayonne Municipal Utilities Authority operates a singular wind turbine. Construction of a single turbine tower was completed in January 2012. It is the first wind turbine manufactured by Leitwind to be installed in the US and the first in the Tri-State (NY-NJ-CT) metropolitan area. The turbine came on line in June 2012, and is used to power a sewage pumping station. Operational difficulties have kept the turbine off-line for various periods, despite repairs by Leitner-Poma. This is a land based wind turbine, as opposed to the proposed offshore wind farms.

== Opposition ==
In recent years, offshore wind in New Jersey has faced increasing opposition from the general public. Based on a 2023 poll from Monmouth University, only 54% of individuals statewide in New Jersey support offshore wind, while 40% oppose, a significant decline in support from 2019, where polls indicated 76% support and 15% opposition.

New Jersey is also home to a number of organized opposition groups. These groups engage in public outreach with New Jersey residents, particularly coastal homeowners, as well as litigation against offshore wind development. Notably, these groups, as well as offshore wind opposition groups more generally and nationwide, have been accused of using misinformation tactics to push their anti-offshore wind agenda. Furthermore, some offshore wind opposition groups have been accused of being funded by right-wing organizations and the fossil fuel industry, serving as a conflict of interest.

Those opposed to offshore wind commonly cite a variety of environmental, social, and economic concerns. One of the most commonly cited environmental concerns, for example, is the death of whales because of offshore wind, though NOAA has stated that there is no correlation between whale deaths and offshore wind development. A common socioeconomic concern, for example, is increasing electricity prices. The debate surrounding these concerns is highly complex and is rapidly changing as energy policy and the available scientific literature on offshore wind's impacts evolves.

== Planned projects ==
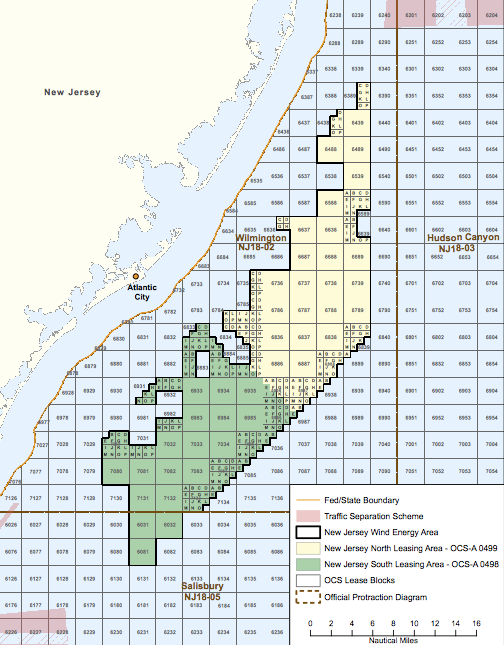
Federal map of leasing areas off the coast of Atlantic City

Wind farm	Offshore BOEM wind energy lease area			States	Coordinates	Capacity (MW)	Projected completion	Turbines	Developer/utility	Regulatory agency	Ref.
Atlantic Shores	Offshore New Jersey OCS-A 0499 (NJWEA North)	13 nautical miles-15 miles (24 km) east of Atlantic City (NJ)	183,353 acres (74,200 ha)	NJ		1,510	2028		Shell New Energies EDF Renewables	NJBPU	
Attentive Energy Two	Offshore New York/New Jersey OCS-A 0538	New York Bight	84,332 acres (34,128 ha)	NJ		1,342	2031		TotalEnergies, Rise Light & Power, Corio Generation	NJBPU	
Leading Light Wind	Offshore New Jersey OCS-A 0542	New York Bight		NJ		2,400	2031		Invenergy energyRE	NJBPU	

=== Atlantic Shores ===
Atlantic Shores is a proposal by EDF Renewables/Shell which acquired rights for BOEM OCS-A 0499 (NJWEA North), an 183,353 acres (74,200 ha) area between Atlantic City and Barnegat Light. It submitted proposals to the BPU in December 2020, which approved them in June 2021.

Shell announced in January 2025 that it would be abandoning its investment in the Atlantic Shores offshore wind project, citing market challenges, rising competition and regulatory uncertainty under President Donald Trump's administration.

== Cancelled projects ==
=== Fisherman's Energy ===
In May 2011, Cape May-based Fisherman's Energy submitted an application to the Board of Public Utilities (BPU) under the Offshore Wind Economic Development Act for a demonstration project to build six wind turbines 2.5 miles (4.0 km) off the coast at Atlantic City called Fisherman's Atlantic City Windfarm. The wind farm was projected to come on line late 2012, but in August of that year the BPU announced they would delay until the end of the year acting on the application. A decision was expected on April 30, 2013. A controversial report released in 2012 questions the economic benefits for the state. In March 2014, the New Jersey Board of Public Utilities rejected a proposal to build the off-shore wind farm, citing financial irregularities and viability. In May 2014, the federal Department of Energy awarded a grant for up to $47 million calling the project "innovative". The revised plan was to install five 5-megawatt turbines three miles off Atlantic City. The project will test a twisted jacket foundation, which is a new type of offshore platform that is cheaper to make and install than traditional platforms. In August 2014, the Superior Court of New Jersey's Appellate Division order the BPU to reconsider its decision in light of the grant and the financial plan presented by Fisherman's. Ground breaking for the onshore portion of the project took place in December 2014. It is one of the few offshore wind farms in the United States to proceed to that stage. After years of wrangling with the BPU, Fisherman's Energy reconfigured its plans in attempt to proceed with the project. The Department of Energy rescinded its grant to the Windfarm in 2017, citing the lack of progress finding a purchaser for the power. Fisherman's Energy laid off all of its staff and suspended its operations. It was later sold to EDF Renewables.

=== Raritan Bayshore ===
A single turbine as part of the Raritan Bayshore Regional Sewarage Authority facility in Union Beach has been mired in litigation and faces other zoning regulatory hurdles and community opposition, but was permitted by the New Jersey Supreme Court.

=== Port Jersey ===
In 2010 the Port Authority of New York and New Jersey announced its intention to build five wind turbines at Port Jersey on the Upper New York Bay within three years. The windfarm was part of a larger plan to expand the container port on the manmade peninsula to accommodate post-panamax ships. In May 2012, Global Container Terminals announced detailed plan of the port extension. It included a proposal for the installation of nine wind turbines in order to meet a zero emissions footprint of their crane operation during periods of wind power generation.

=== Ørsted Ocean Wind ===
In 2018, New Jersey Governor Phil Murphy signed an executive order to revive subsidies for wind power in the state. In 2018 the BPU received three proposals from private companies to develop wind farms off the coast. In June 2019, the state awarded a contract for a wind farm 15 miles off Atlantic City to Ørsted US Offshore Wind for its Ocean Wind project. The state gave approval for the second phase of the project, Ocean Wind 2, in June 2021.

Ørsted canceled both projects on October 31, 2023, due to poor financial outlook caused by inflation and supply chain disruptions. Ørsted paid $125 million to cancel the agreement.

== New Jersey Wind Port ==
The Port of Paulsboro is located on the Delaware River and Mantua Creek in and around Paulsboro approximately 78 miles (126 km) from the Atlantic Ocean. Traditionally one of the nation's busiest for marine transfer operations of petroleum products, the port is being redeveloped as an adaptable omniport able to handle a diversity of bulk, break bulk cargo and shipping containers. Studies completed in 2012 concluded that the port was well suited to become a center for the manufacture, assembly, and transport of wind turbines and platforms the development of Atlantic Wind Connection.

In 2020 Governor Murphy announced the development of the New Jersey Wind Port on Artificial Island on the Delaware River.

== Statistics ==
New Jersey wind generation capacity by year
Megawatts of wind capacity

New Jersey wind generation (GWh, million kWh)
Year	Total	Jan	Feb	Mar	Apr	May	Jun	Jul	Aug	Sep	Oct	Nov	Dec
2006	16	0	0	2	2	2	1	1	1	1	2	2	2
2007	20	2	2	3	2	1	1	1	1	1	2	2	2
2008	20	2	1	2	1	2	2	1	1	1	2	2	3
2009	20	1	2	2	2	2	1	1	1	1	2	2	3
2010	12	1	1	1	1	1	1	1	1	1	1	1	1
2011	12	1	1	1	1	1	1	1	1	1	1	1	1
2012	12	1	1	1	1	1	1	1	1	1	1	1	1
2013	10	1	1	1	1	1	1	0	0	1	1	1	1
2014	23	3	2	2	3	2	1	1	1	1	2	3	2
2015	22	3	2	3	2	2	1	1	1	1	2	2	2
2016	20	3	2	2	1	1	1	1	1	1	2	2	3
2017	22	2	2	2	2	2	2	1	1	2	2	2	2
2018	21	3	2	2	2	2	1	1	1	1	2	2	2
2019	21	2	2	2	2	2	2	1	1	1	2	2	2
2020	18	2	2	2	3	2	0	0	0	1	2	2	2
2021	13	2	2	3	2	2	2						

== See also ==
- Solar power in New Jersey
- List of power stations in New Jersey
- Atlantic Wind Connection
- PJM Interconnection
- Wind power in the United States
- Renewable energy in the United States
