= List of offshore wind farms in the United States =

There are three operating offshore wind farms in the United States, and several more are in permitting or under construction. The Bureau of Ocean Energy Management studies potential sites in federal waters for offshore wind energy development and leases sites to developers, who work with state regulatory agencies to interconnect and market their electricity.

== Operational utility scale ==
Wind farm	Offshore BOEM wind energy lease area			Receiving states	Coordinates	Capacity (MW)	Completion year	Turbines	Developer /utility	Regulatory agency	Ref.
Block Island Wind	Rhode Island state waters			RI	41°06′52.96″N 71°31′16.18″W	30	2016	5 x 6MW Haliade 150	Ørsted	Rhode Island PUC	
Coastal Virginia Offshore Wind - pilot project	Offshore Virginia; OCS-A 0497	25 nmi (nautical miles) east of Cape Henry (VA)	2,135 acres (864 ha)	VA	36°53′30″N 75°29′30″W	12	2020	2 x 6MW; Siemens Gamesa SWT-6.0-154	Ørsted; Dominion Energy	State Corporation Commission	
South Fork	Massachusetts & Rhode Island; OCS-A 0517 (North Lease Area)	26 nmi southeast of Montauk Point, Long Island (NY) & 16.6 nmi southeast of Block Island (RI)	13,700 acres (5,500 ha)	NY	41.092°N 71.311161°W	132	2024	12 x 11MW Siemens Gamesa 11.0-200 DD	Ørsted; Global Infrastructure Partners	NYSERDA Long Island Power Authority	
Revolution Wind	Offshore Rhode Island; OCS-A 0486 (North Lease Area)	halfway between Montauk Point (NY) & Martha's Vineyard (MA)	83,798 acres (33,912 ha)	RI; CT	41.124974°N 71.38818°W	704	2026	64 Siemens Gamesa 11.0-200 DD	Ørsted; Global Infrastructure Partners; National Grid; United Illuminating	Connecticut DEEP; Rhode Island PUC	
Vineyard Wind	Offshore Massachusetts; OCS-A 0501	13 nmi southwest of Martha's Vineyard (MA)	65,296 acres (26,424 ha)	MA	41.03325°N 70.61667°W	806	2026	62 13MW GE Haliade-X	Avangrid; Copenhagen Infrastructure Partners	Massachusetts Department of Public Utilities	

== Under construction ==
The following table lists offshore wind farms that have begun construction in federal waters. Some of these projects have begun delivering power to the grid, with some of their turbines already coming online.

Wind farm	Offshore BOEM wind energy lease area			Receiving states	Coordinates	Capacity (MW)	Projected completion	Turbines	Developer	Regulatory agency /utility	Ref.
Coastal Virginia Offshore Wind	Offshore Virginia; OCS-A 0483	25 to 35 nmi east of Cape Henry (VA)	112,799 acres (45,648 ha)	VA	36.9°N 75.38°W	2,640	2026	176 Siemens Gamesa 14.0-222 DD	Dominion Energy	State Corporation Commission	
Sunrise Wind	Offshore Massachusetts & Rhode Island; OCS-A 0487 (North Lease Area)	26 nmi east of Montauk Point, Long Island (NY) & 16.6 nmi southeast of Block Island (RI)	86,823 acres (35,136 ha)	NY	40.99333°N 71.12122°W	924	2026	84 Siemens Gamesa 11.0-200 DD	Ørsted; Con Ed Transmission	NYSERDA New York Power Authority	
Empire Wind 1	Offshore New York; OCS-A 0512 (Hudson North)	12 nmi south of Jones Beach, Long Island (NY)	79,350 acres (32,110 ha)	NY	40.329226°N 73.507861°W	816	2027	Vestas V236-15MW	Equinor	NYSERDA	

== Proposed wind farms ==
=== Atlantic Coast ===
The following table lists offshore wind farm areas (by nameplate capacity) that are in various states development for the Outer Continental Shelf in U.S. territorial waters of the East Coast of the United States, where a Bureau of Ocean Energy Management (BOEM) wind energy area lease has been secured and have gained at least some required regulatory approval before construction can begin. Distances are approximated and generally represent closest point of turbine array to shoreline, while acreage represents size of total lease area, which may be shared, and not the blocks within them allocated for the wind farm.

Projects that have received operations approval from BOEM are highlighted in blue.

Wind farm	Offshore BOEM wind energy lease area			Receiving states	Coordinates	Capacity (MW)	Projected completion	Turbines	Developer	Regulatory agency /utility	Ref.
Atlantic Shores	Offshore New Jersey; OCS-A 0499 (NJWEA North)	13 nmi east of Atlantic City (NJ)	183,353 acres (74,200 ha)	NJ		1,510	2028	Vestas V236-15MW	Shell New Energies EDF Renewables	NJBPU	
Attentive Energy Two	Offshore New York/New Jersey; OCS-A 0538	47 nmi southeast of Jones Beach (NY) & 36 nmi east of Seaside Heights(NJ)	84,332 acres (34,128 ha)	NJ		1,342	2031		TotalEnergies Corio Generation	NJBPU	
Carolina Long Bay	Offshore North Carolina OCS-A 0545 OCS-A 0546	20 nmi southeast of Southport, North Carolina		NC		2,250	2030		TotalEnergy Renewables USA Duke Energy		
Kitty Hawk North Wind	Offshore North Carolina; OCS-A 0508	24 nmi east of Corolla (NC)	122,405 acres (49,536 ha)	NC		800		Up to 69	Avangrid Renewables		
Leading Light Wind	Offshore New Jersey; OCS-A 0542	30 nmi east of NJ		NJ		2,400	2031		Invenergy energyRE	NJBPU	
MarWin	Offshore Maryland; OCS-A 0490	26 nmi east of Ocean City (MD)	46,970 acres (19,010 ha)	MD		300		22	US Wind	Maryland PSC	
Momentum Wind	Offshore Maryland; OCS-A 0490	26 nmi east of Ocean City (MD)	46,970 acres (19,010 ha)	MD		808		55	US Wind	Maryland PSC	
New England Wind 1	Offshore Massachusetts OCS-A 0534	17 nautical miles south of Martha's Vineyard, Massachusetts and 20 nautical miles southwest of Nantucket, Massachusetts	101,590 acres (41,110 ha)	MA		791	2031		Avangrid Renewables	Massachusetts Department of Public Utilities	
SouthCoast Wind	Offshore Massachusetts; OCS-A 0521	25 nmi south of Martha's Vineyard (MA)	127,388 acres (51,552 ha)	MA, RI		1,287	2030		Shell New Energies; Ocean Winds	MDPU	
Vineyard Wind 2	Offshore Massachusetts; OCS-A 0522	25 nmi south of Nantucket (MA)	132,370 acres (53,570 ha)	MA		1,200			Copenhagen Infrastructure Partners	Massachusetts Department of Public Utilities	

=== Pacific and Gulf of Mexico coasts ===
In October 2021, the Biden administration approved the initiation of mapping out potential lease areas along the Pacific and Gulf of Mexico coasts. In March 2022, five areas off the coast of California were defined for lease. An auction in December 2022 leased the areas for a total of $757 million.

Wind farm	Offshore BOEM wind energy lease area		Receiving state	Coordinates	Capacity (MW)	Projected completion	Turbines	Developer /utility	Regulatory agency	Ref.
TBA	Offshore Northern California OCS-P 0561	63,338 acres (25,632 ha)	CA					RWE Offshore Wind Holdings		
TBA	Offshore Northern California OCS-P 0562	69,031 acres (27,936 ha)	CA					California North Floating		
TBA	Offshore Central California OCS-P 0563	80,062 acres (32,400 ha)	CA					Equinor Wind US		
TBA	Offshore Northern California OCS-P 0564	80,418 acres (32,544 ha)	CA					Central California Offshore Wind		
TBA	Offshore Northern California OCS-P 0565	80,418 acres (32,544 ha)	CA					Invenergy California Offshore		

== Abandoned, postponed or decommissioned ==
- Cape Wind (Massachusetts)
- Delaware Offshore Wind Farm
- Fisherman's Energy Atlantic City Windfarm (New Jersey). Groundbreaking for the onshore portion of the project took place in December 2014. It was postponed in July 2017.
- Ocean Wind 1 and 2 (New Jersey). Canceled by Ørsted due to poor financial outlook in 2023.
- Icebreaker Wind (Lake Erie, Ohio) 21 MW, placed on hold in 2023.
- Skipjack Wind Farm
- Park City Wind

== See also ==
- Atlantic Wind Connection
- Energy Policy Act of 2005
- List of wind farms
- List of offshore wind farms
- Lists of offshore wind farms by country
- Wind power in the United States
