= Maryland Offshore Wind =

Planned offshore wind farm in the United States

Maryland Offshore Wind Project
- Country: United States
- Location: Lease Area OCS-A 0490, off the coast of Maryland
- Coordinates: 38°22′9″N 74°47′36″W
- Status: Approved for Construction
- Owner: US Wind

Wind farm
- Type: Offshore
- Distance from shore: 10.1 nautical miles (16.2 km) offshore of Ocean City, MD
- Hub height: 139 meters (~456 feet)
- Rotor diameter: 220 meters (~721 feet)
- Site area: 79,707 acres (~124 square miles, ~322 square kilometers)

Power generation
- Nameplate capacity: 2,200 MW (2.2 GW)

External links
- Website: US Wind Project BOEM

Maryland Offshore Wind is a planned offshore wind farm owned by US Wind and located on 79,707 acres of federal waters 10.1 nautical miles (16.2 kilometers) off the coast of Ocean City, Maryland. The project is anticipated to have a capacity upwards of 2.2 GW and generate power equivalent to the consumption of 718,000 houses from at most 114 wind turbine generators, according to the Bureau of Ocean Energy Management (BOEM). Offshore cables from the project will make landfall at 3Rs Beach in Delaware, and will connect to the onshore point of interconnection at Indian River Substation. BOEM estimates that over the next seven years, the project will contribute to the creation of 2,600 jobs annually.

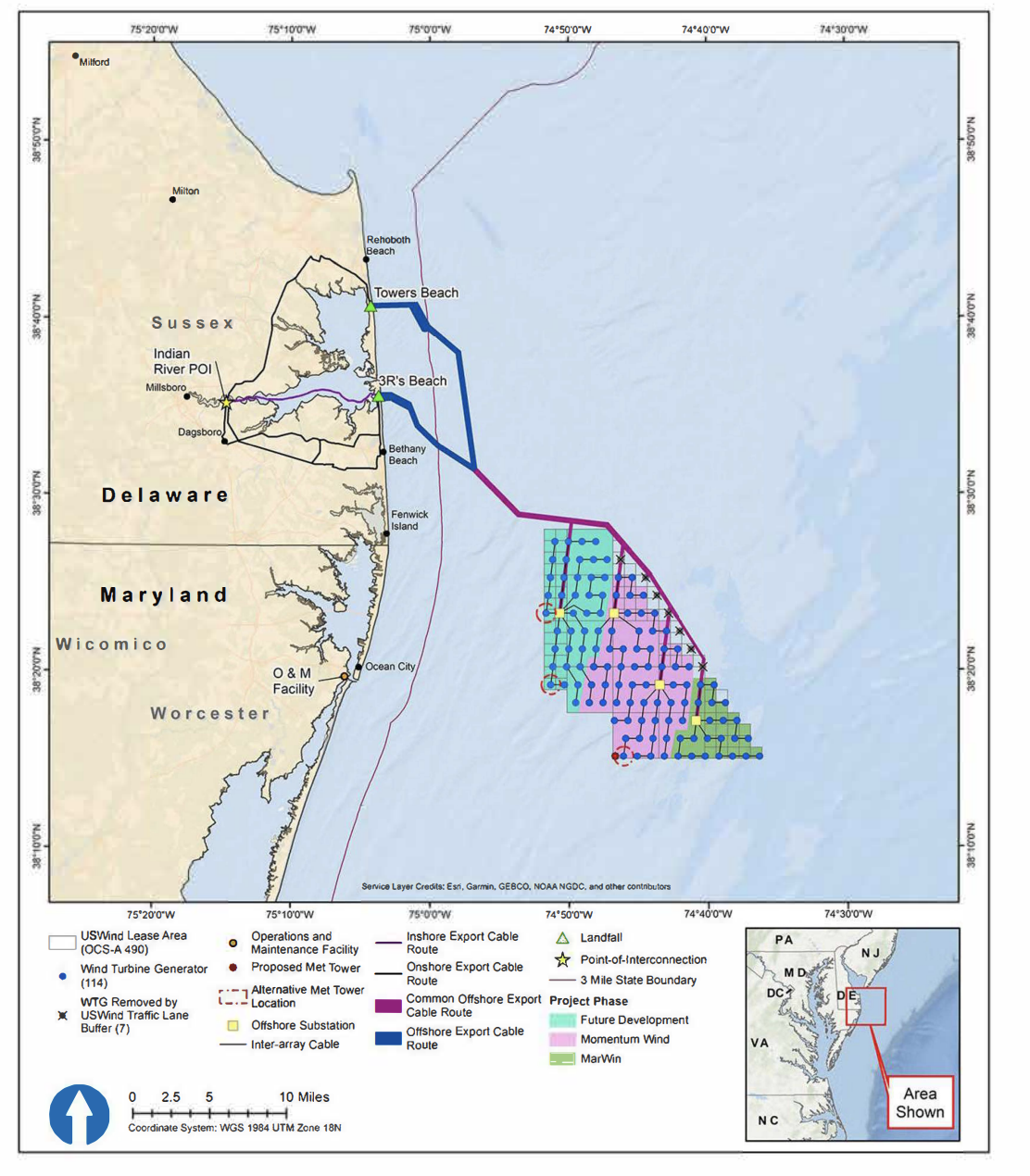

Following an approximately ten-year development process that began with securing a federal lease in 2014, the project received federal approval of its Construction and Operations Plan (COP) by BOEM on December 3, 2024. As of January 3, 2025, US Wind has completed the BOEM Environmental Review and Permitting Processes. As the tenth offshore wind project in the U.S. at a commercial scale, the Maryland Offshore Wind project is a key player in helping Maryland achieve its ambitious goal of 50% renewable energy by 2030, thereby bolstering energy security and contributing to state and federal stakeholder energy targets. It also contributes to the Biden Administration's goal of enacting 30 GW of offshore wind energy capacity in the United States by 2030.

According to BOEM, the project consisted of three separate stages, of which two had been announced. The State of Maryland signed offtake agreements to purchase the power produced from the first two phases of this project, MarWin and Momentum Wind. MarWin, expected to generate 300 MW, acquired an offshore renewable energy certificate (OREC) contract in 2017. Momentum Wind, expected to generate 808 MW, acquired an additional OREC contract in 2021. In total, it was estimated that the total project cost would be $11.5 billion.

In January 2025, the Maryland Public Service Commission awarded US Wind with additional OREC's. This update divides the project development into four phases, totaling 114 turbines with 15 MW wind energy capacity each. The commercial operation date of Phase 1 is anticipated for 2029, while Phases 2, 3, and 4 have an anticipated commercial operation date the following year, in December 2030.

== Development timeline ==
=== Timeline ===
Early Development & Planning	February 2011: BOEM designates Wind Energy Area (WEA); February 2012: Bureau of Ocean Energy Management (BOEM) publishes Call for Information & Nominations to assess interest in Call Area; February 2012: Environmental Assessment completed with finding of no significant impact (FONSI); August 2014: BOEM holds lease auction for Leases OCS-A 0489 and OCS-A 0490. US Wind wins both leases; December 2014: BOEM issues two commercial Leases signed to US Wind; March 2018: BOEM approves Site Assessment Plan (SAP) for Lease OCS-A 0490
Environmental Review & Permitting	2017: State of Maryland awards Offshore Renewable Energy Certificates (OREC's) to US Wind for MarWin; March 2018: BOEM approves request from US Wind to merge Lease areas OCS-A 0489 and OCS-A 0490 into a single lease, OCS-A 0490; August 2020: US Wind submits initial Construction and Operations Plan (COP); 2021: State of Maryland awards Offshore Renewable Energy Certificates (OREC's) to US Wind for Momentum Wind; October 2023: BOEM publishes Notice of Availability (NOA) of Draft Environmental Impact Statement (EIS); July 2024: BOEM publishes Notice of Availability (NOA) of Final Environmental Impact Statement (EIS); January 2025: Maryland Public Service Commission grants additional OREC's to US Wind
Record of Decision & Approvals	September 2024: BOEM & other federal agencies publish Notice of Availability (NOA) of joint Record of Decision (ROD); December 2024: BOEM approves final COP of Maryland Offshore Wind Project; January 2025: Completion of Environmental Review and Permitting Processes
Construction & Installation	2029: Expected commercial operation date of Phase 1 of Maryland Offshore Wind Project; December 2030: Expected commercial operation date of Phases 2, 3, and 4 of Maryland Offshore Wind Project

== Lease area ==
=== Location ===
The Maryland Offshore Wind Project will be located within Lease OCS-A 0490 on 79,707 acres of federal waters, 10.1 nautical miles (16.2 km) offshore Ocean City, MD and about 9 nautical miles offshore Sussex County, Delaware. An offshore export cable corridor will connect this Lease area to the infrastructure onshore, making landfall at 3Rs Beach in Sussex County, Delaware.

=== History of lease area ===
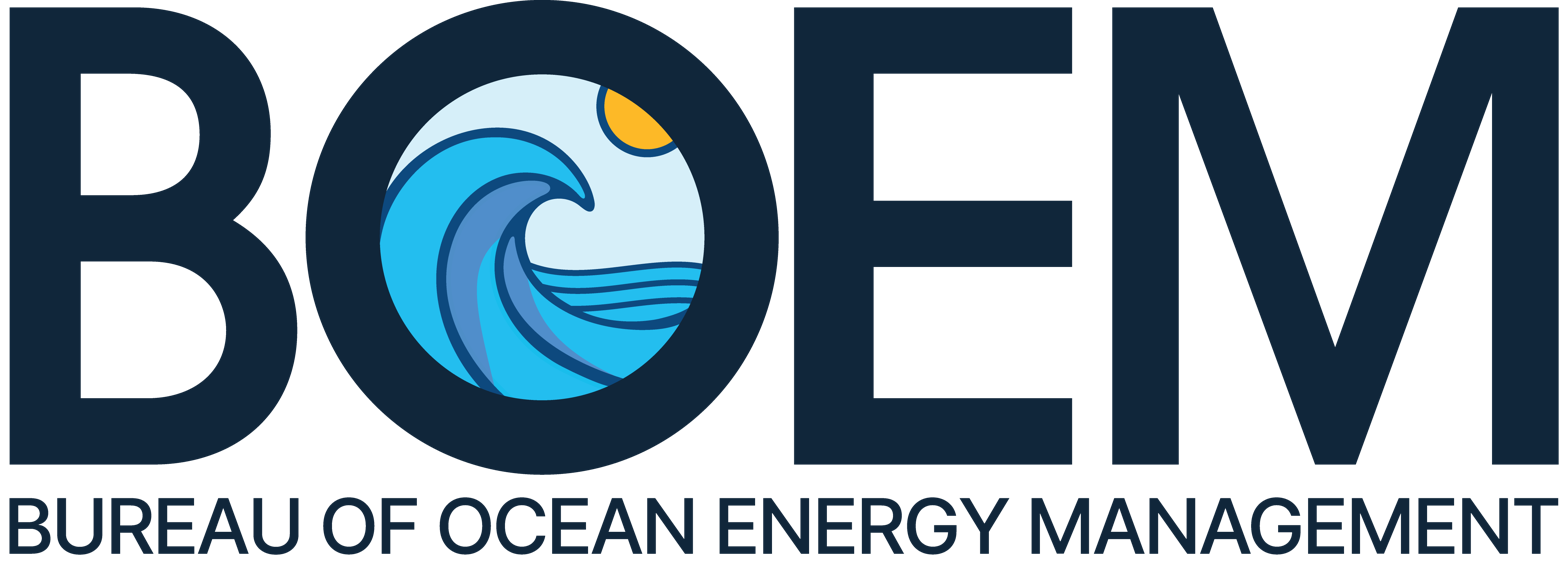
Bureau of Ocean Energy Management Logo

The Bureau of Ocean Energy Management (BOEM) initiated the leasing process offshore Maryland by issuing a Request for Interest (RFI). This took place on November 9, 2010, and it was meant to measure if firms had interest in obtaining commercial wind leases in an offshore call area near Maryland. BOEM’s rationale for selecting to auction this area was through consultation with the Maryland Renewable Energy Task Force, an intergovernmental stakeholder group involving agencies and organizations at the federal, state, and local levels. After the location was referred to as a "call area," it was designated to be a "wind energy area," and finally designated as two "lease areas." On December 18, 2013, BOEM published a Proposed Sale Notice to auction two Lease areas in the selected location.

Federal Trade Commission Logo

BOEM held the competitive lease auction process for Leases OCS-A 0489 and OCS-A 0490 on August 19, 2014, and it was the third competitive lease sale for offshore wind. It is important to mention that there were two other participating firms in the auction: Green Sail Energy LLC and SCS Maryland Energy LLC. The auction lasted 19 rounds, and the two Lease areas were auctioned off at a total price of $8,701,098 to US Wind. These leases were officially granted to US Wind by BOEM on December 1, 2014. On January 10, 2018, US Wind’s request to merge these two Lease areas was approved by BOEM, with the Lease name OCS-A 0490 preserved. This merged Lease area covers an area of 79,707 acres. After winning the bid, the Attorney General along with the Federal Trade Commission (FTC) performed an antitrust review of the entire auction process.

== Regulatory and permitting process ==
Within one year of US Wind signing the lease agreement, the firm was required to submit a Site Assessment Plan (SAP). The SAP is submitted by wind project developers in an effort to gather knowledge on a potential Lease area and to determine where to place key infrastructure. The SAP provides a plan for the investigation of the conditions of the Lease area to determine possible threats to the environment or health and evaluate appropriate locations for infrastructure to be placed. Once the SAP was approved in March 2018, US Wind had up to 4.5 years to implement these assessments and submit the Construction and Operations Plan (COP) to BOEM for approval.

US Wind’s original Construction and Operations Plan (COP) was submitted on August 11, 2020, providing an initial detailed framework of the infrastructure, installation, operation, and decommissioning processes of the project. The COP was updated ten times between 2021 and 2024, with the most recently updated COP published on July 1, 2024.

The COP helped inform the Draft Environmental Impact Statement (EIS). The Notice of Intent to prepare a Draft EIS was published on June 6, 2022, which launched a 30-day public comment period that provided stakeholders with in-person and virtual opportunities to provide oral and written commentary on key project components. The Notice of Availability of the Draft EIS was published by BOEM in October 2023, which then initiated a 45-day public comment period consisting of two in-person and two virtual meetings.

The Draft EIS and the subsequent comment period informed the Final Environmental Impact Statement, and the Notice of Availability of this document was released on July 29, 2024. The Final EIS served to inform the Record of Decision, which outlines several analyzed project alternatives and describes the Preferred Alternative approved by the Department of the Interior. The Notice of Availability of the Record of Decision was published by BOEM on September 5, 2024.

The Maryland Offshore Wind Project COP was officially approved by the Department of the Interior on December 3, 2024, which authorized a commercial offshore wind energy development comprising up to 114 offshore wind turbines, one meteorological tower, and four offshore substations. The power generated would be transmitted to the onshore grid via up to four export cable corridors offshore, with a planned landfall at 3Rs Beach in Delaware. The Delaware Department of Natural Resources and Environmental Control (DNREC) approved the cable landing at 3Rs Beach in December 2024. According to DNREC, US Wind will be required to perform monitoring strategies during the construction and operation phases and provide compensatory mechanisms for environmental concerns as part of this approval.

As of January 3, 2025, all Environmental Review and Permitting processes have been completed.

== Finance ==
=== Offtake agreement ===
The Maryland Offshore Wind project received ORECs from the state of Maryland in 2017 and 2021 for MarWin and Momentum Wind phases respectively. The Maryland Offshore Wind Energy Act of 2013 established the OREC program to incentivize offshore wind development by amending the state’s Renewable Portfolio Standard to include projects located off the coast of Maryland. The Maryland Public Service Commission utilizes these credits to provide financial support for eligible offshore renewable projects. US Wind is authorized by the state of Maryland to sell up to 913,845 ORECs per year for 20 years for the MarWin phase and 2,513,753 per year for 20 years for the Momentum Wind phase. The ORECs will be sold at $54.17 per OREC adjusted to 2012 USD. In January 2025, the Maryland PSC announced that they had awarded additional ORECs to US Wind now totaling 1,710 MW in capacity up from 1,056 MW under the first two rounds. The first OREC schedules are expected to commence in January 2031.

=== Cost and finance structure ===
US Wind is a subsidiary of Renexia, an Italian renewable energy developer that owns 80% of US Wind and is backed by Apollo Global Management through its Infrastructure Funds. Apollo has committed $265 million to acquire an equity stake in US Wind and support development costs. Additionally, Robert Strictland, a former Apollo employee with expertise in the energy and infrastructure industries, joined US Wind’s executive management as Chief Financial Officer in May 2024 as part of the partnership.

US Wind has partnered with Haizea Wind Group to develop a 100-acre monopile production facility at Sparrows Point Steel in Baltimore and has pledged to invest $150 million in port infrastructure improvements. Additionally, Hellenic Cables, a subsidiary of Belgium-based Cenergy, has also joined forces with US Wind to produce an undersea cable manufacturing facility in Maryland according to testimony from US Wind Chief Executive Officer Jeffrey Grybowski. Hellenic Cables has acquired a 38-acre plot at Wagner’s Point in Baltimore with plans to commence operations by 2026.

== Infrastructure development ==
According to the Maryland Public Service Commission, the updated project timeline anticipates the commercial operation date of Phase 1 to be 2029, while Phases 2, 3, and 4 are expected to be operational in December 2030. How this update impacts the timing of the construction process, as depicted in the COP, is not clear. However, the project is expected to help contribute to Maryland's mandate of 50% of the electricity generated in the State of Maryland coming from renewable sources by 2030, according to the Clean Energy Jobs Act passed in 2019.

The project COP depicts a potential construction timeframe for the first phase of the project, MarWin. The initial construction campaign features activity in the foundation design, design and procurement of onshore and offshore substations and cables, and wind turbine generator design primarily between 2022 and 2025. The 2nd and 3rd construction campaigns would occur from 2022-2026, and the 4th construction campaign would occur from 2022-2027. For these three latter campaigns, engineering and design processes would occur solely from 2022-2024, according to the COP.

Construction Campaign	Activity	Expected Timing and Duration
1st	Foundation Design, Procurement, and Installation	2022 Q1 - 2025 Q3
1st	Onshore Substation Design, Procurement, and Installation	2022 Q1 - 2025 Q2
1st	Submarine Cable Design, Procurement, and Installation	2022 Q1 - 2025 Q4
1st	Onshore Cable Design, Procurement, and Installation	2022 Q1 - 2026 Q1
1st	Offshore Substation Design, Procurement, and Installation	2022 Q1 - 2025 Q3
1st	Wind Turbine Generators Design, Procurement, and Installation	2022 Q1 - 2025 Q4
2nd, 3rd, and 4th	Engineering and Design	2022 Q1 - 2024 Q3
2nd, 3rd, and 4th	Foundations	2025 Q2 - 2027 Q3
2nd, 3rd, and 4th	Onshore Substations	2024 Q1 - 2027 Q2
2nd, 3rd, and 4th	Submarine Cable	2025 Q3 - 2027 Q3
2nd, 3rd, and 4th	Offshore Substation	2025 Q3 - 2027 Q3
2nd, 3rd, and 4th	Wind Turbine Generators	2026 Q2 - 2027 Q4

US Wind developed a project design envelope (PDE) approach in which they elaborate on multiple design scenarios that guide the development of Maryland Offshore Wind. This range of plausible development casts a wide net of potential selections that fit the parameters of the PDE, providing greater flexibility for US Wind. They also account for possible technological developments that may refine the project installation.

=== Offshore wind farm ===
In the Construction and Operations Plan, the maximum specifications of the project included up to 121 wind turbine generators, one meteorological tower, and four offshore substations within the Lease area. The wind turbine generators were proposed to be the GE Haliade X -14.7, which feature specifications of a 139 meter (m) hub height, 220 m rotor diameter, and 14.7 MW of nameplate capacity. The maximum nameplate capacity of the potential wind turbines was 18 MW, spaced 0.77 nautical miles apart from east to west and 1.02 nautical miles from north to south with conventional three-blade configurations. Additional wind turbine generator maximum specifications included a total tip height of up to 286 m (938 ft), a hub height of up to 161 m (528 ft), and a rotor diameter of up to 250 m (820 ft). The offshore substations would be established to bear the load of approximately 300-400 MW of capacity from the wind turbines. Monopile foundations would be utilized to stabilize the turbines, composed of steel tubes supplied from Sparrows Point installed into the seafloor.

The meteorological tower, in which meteorological metrics (wind, temperature, etc.) are recorded, would be fixed to the seafloor near the southern border of the Lease area. It would include a wide array of monitoring devices to obtain local wave and weather conditions to measure the efficiency of energy generation. Its location was selectively preferred as its impact on fishing practices and vessel navigation may be reduced. Additionally, its location takes advantage of favorable northwest and southwest winds and has a clear overlook of Ocean City, enabling data to be communicated at a faster rate.

In the Record of Decision, the Proposed Action reduced the maximum number of wind turbine generators to 114, due to a potential setback of 1 nautical mile (1.9 km) from a south-east traffic lane. Each wind turbine generator would have 14-18 MW of capacity. The Proposed Action calls for up to four offshore substations, four offshore export cables, one meteorological tower, and three onshore substations that connect to the electrical grid.

The revised plan for the project as of January 2025, according to the Maryland Public Service Commission, consists of 114 turbines that each have 15 MW of wind energy capacity.

=== Grid interconnection ===
According to the Construction and Operations Plan, an array of offshore cables would connect this infrastructure to the onshore electric grid. The cables are expected to be buried anywhere from 3–10 feet under the seabed depending on the selected route. The turbines would be connected to the offshore substations through 66 kV buried inter-array cables. Up to four 230-275 kV offshore export cables, located on the outer continental shelf as well as in state waters, would then connect these offshore substations to one of various proposed landing locations. Landfall at 3R’s Beach was considered most likely, and this was confirmed in the Proposed Action of the Record of Decision. The offshore cable corridors were selected as they avoid interference with local storm resiliency initiatives around the Delmarva region and with areas of sand borrowing utilized for beach nourishment purposes.

The Proposed Action in the ROD calls for inter-array cables linking the wind turbines to the offshore substations, as well as up to four offshore export cables and three onshore substations located near Millsboro, Delaware. The export cable is expected to make landfall at 3R's Beach. Upwards of four buried onshore export cables will then connect this landing region to the onshore US Wind substations, and then subsequently to the onshore point of interconnection at Indian River Substation which is currently owned by Delmarva Power and Light. Installing these cables upwards of sixty feet below the beach is intended to minimize disturbance of dunes and local sensitive ecosystems.

Overall, the anticipated corridor of cables from the Lease area to the onshore substations will range from approximately 40 to 60 miles as dictated by the particular selected design scenario. Suppliers from the United States, Europe, and Asia are expected to produce the cables for this project.

== Benefits and concerns ==
=== Socioeconomic impacts ===
The Maryland Offshore Wind project is set to bring significant economic impacts to the region, impacting commercial fisheries, for-hire recreational fishing, employment, land use, coastal infrastructure, navigation, vessel traffic, military use, aviation, and tourism.

BOEM has stated that as a result of the development and construction period for this project, 2,680 jobs will be supported annually for seven years. This is possible as a wide variety of jobs and skilled workers are needed for offshore wind projects from shorter-term port upgrades or new stations to more long-term maintenance jobs. In Maryland, a report “identified 74 different occupations necessary for the work of building and operating an offshore wind farm, including welders, pipefitters, engineers, ship captains, painters, and iron workers”.

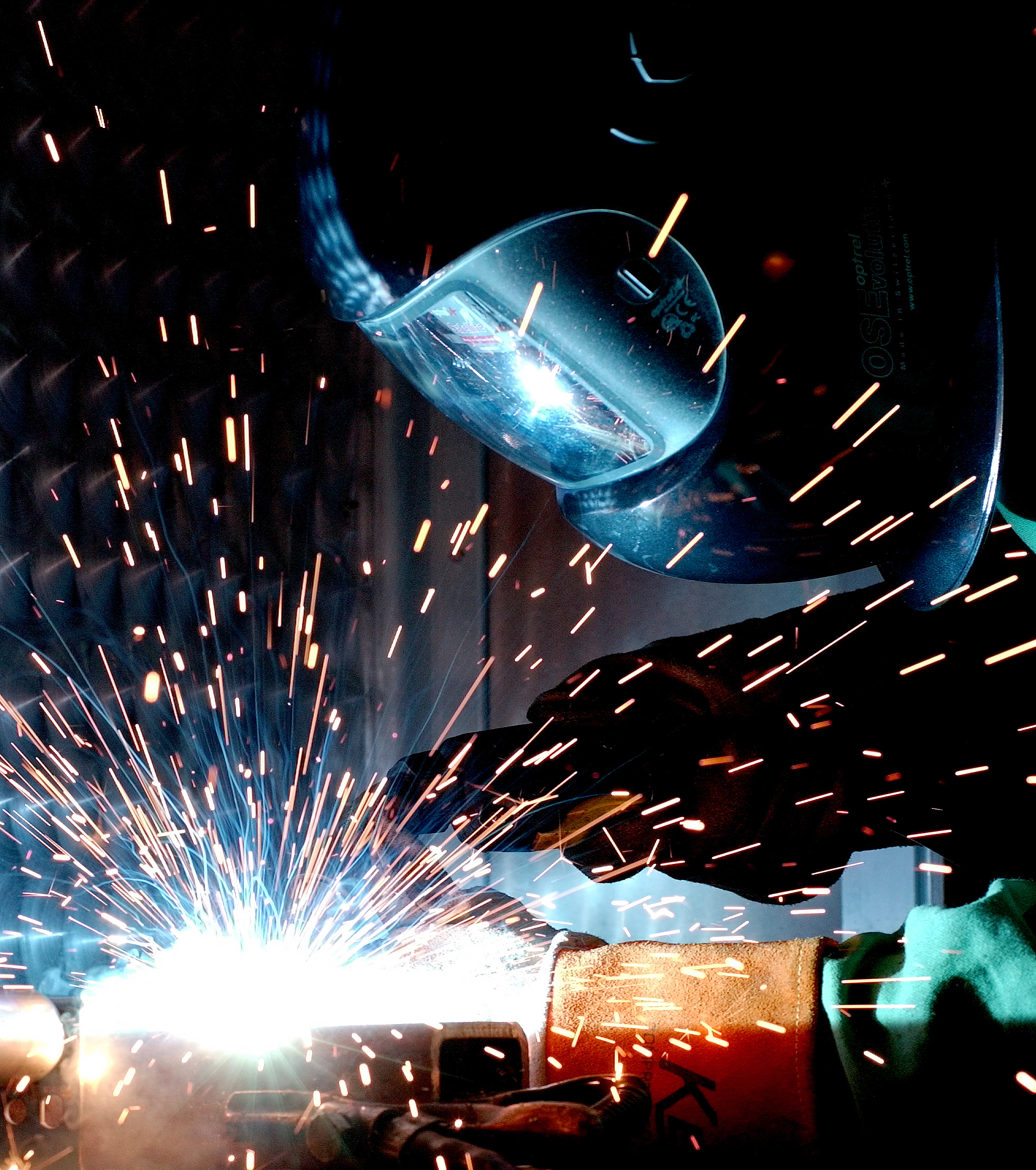
Welding

There are a wide diversity of jobs that are relevant in offshore wind and beyond; however, this also poses a challenge as some of the workforce needs to be trained to handle these relatively new techniques. Some jobs needed for offshore wind demand skills in smart grid system management, wind and solar farm monitoring, energy storage solutions, data acquisition and analysis, sensor technology, performance optimization, grid integration, environmental monitoring, troubleshooting, maintenance, and more. In order to combat this workforce skills gap, firms may sponsor specific certifications for workers within the offshore wind industry. On an individual level, certifications can increase workers’ earning potential too, as the Labor Market Information Institute State Certification and Licenses Data Tables of 2020 show that in Maryland there is an overall 76% earnings increase between individuals who hold a certification versus workers that do not. Furthermore, these certifications are transferable. For instance, the Occupational Safety and Health Administration (OSHA) safety certification is recognized across energy sectors; the Building Performance Institute (BPI) certification is relevant for energy efficiency and building performance; the Advanced Certificate in Renewable Energy Electrical Systems Installation and Maintenance (REESIM) covers various aspects of renewable energy systems, including wind turbines, solar power, photovoltaics, geothermal, and hydrogen power; the Leadership in Energy and Environmental Design (LEED) certification focuses on sustainable building practices.

Also, US Wind is building a strong local supply chain with the Maryland offshore wind sector. For example, there is a clear pathway and ways to register local businesses in the supply database of Offshore Wind Maryland, including exhaustive information as to all the different contractor types that might be needed throughout the project, such as advertising for component manufacturing (turbine components, subsea cables), supply chain services (logistics and transportation, warehousing), maintenance services (routine conditioning, repair services), monitoring and inspection (drone services), consulting, legal support, etc. Overall, the state works with OSW developers to supply these local business services, which will contribute to the economic growth of Maryland business-owners and employees of those businesses.

Importantly, mentioning the cost per MW/h of offshore wind energy compared to other sources is a relevant factor in the economic implications of the Maryland OSW project. In Lazard’s June 2024 Levelized Cost Of Energy Analysis Report, the cost per MW/h is illustrated for a myriad of US energy sources. When comparing offshore wind technologies to nuclear technologies, the cost per MW/h is lower for offshore wind ($143) versus nuclear energy ($226).

=== Climate and environment ===
The development and operations of this project could have varying environmental effects. On one hand, "offshore wind holds the greatest opportunity for Maryland to decarbonize its economy." Additionally, "the U.S. Department of Energy estimates offshore wind could generate roughly twice the amount of electricity the nation consumes annually." Therefore, it is an opportunity that can have a great impact in reducing greenhouse gas emissions and fighting climate change. On the other hand, it is important to discuss the ways in which ways environmental risks may manifest from this project, referred to as Impact-Producing Factors (IPFs). There are groups that draw attention to possible effects that the project may bring. The EIS specifically examines possible effects on: air quality, water quality, bats, benthic resources, birds, coastal habitat and fauna, invertebrates, essential fish habitats, marine mammals, sea turtles, and wetlands.

Bats may experience habitat loss due to the Impact-Producing Factor (IPF) of land disturbance, reducing the space available for their populations. The presence of structures and artificial lighting could disrupt their natural behaviors and increase the risk of collision mortality. Additionally, local traffic may contribute to displacement effects, while changes in lighting could alter insect concentrations, potentially impacting their foraging habits.

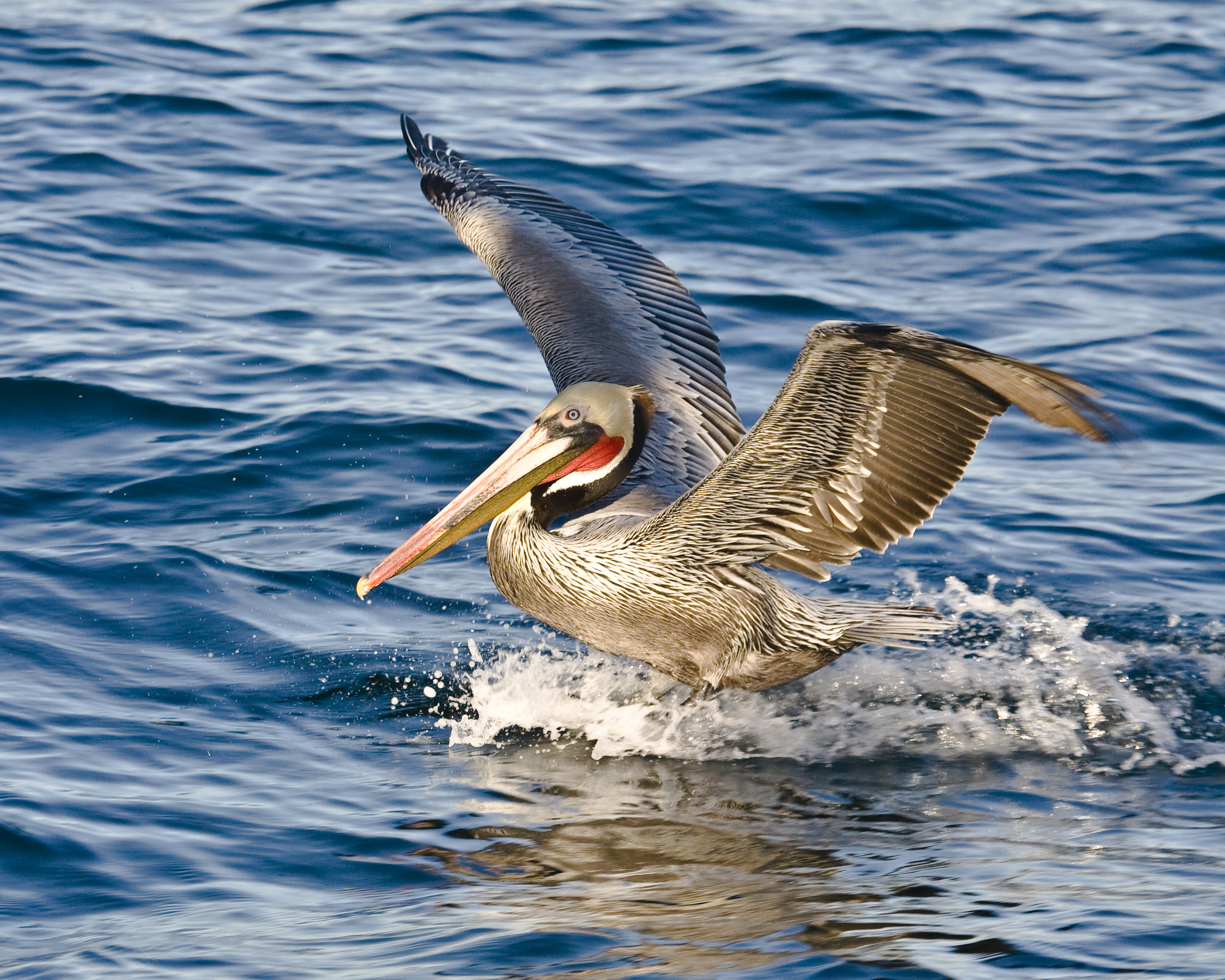
Brown Pelican (diving bird)

Similarly, birds may face significant challenges. Seafloor pile driving could disturb diving birds by modifying their habitat, while sediment displacement may affect prey availability, further disrupting their food sources. Airborne and underwater noise might drive birds away from preferred habitats, and accidental discharges pose potential toxicity risks. Additionally, vehicle and structure collisions could lead to mortality, while debris from the project may introduce entanglement or ingestion hazards.

Coastal habitats and fauna could also be affected by IPFs such as land disturbance, traffic, lighting, and discharges. Construction activities may lead to habitat loss or modification, while onshore noise and lighting could contribute to further disturbances. Accidental pollutant releases may impact local ecosystems, including finfish, invertebrates, and essential fish habitats. Construction activities also risk crushing or burying fish and invertebrates, affecting eggs and larvae. Underwater noise could disrupt species differently depending on their hearing capabilities, while electromagnetic fields and cable heat might interfere with electrosensitive species such as sturgeon, skates, and sharks. Additionally, accidental spills and debris releases could degrade water quality, further threatening aquatic ecosystems.

Marine mammals could also experience impacts from noise, traffic, seafloor disturbances, and water quality changes. Habitat loss may occur due to alterations in the seabed and water column. Underwater noise from construction and vessel traffic could interfere with their communication and navigation. Certain species may also be affected by electromagnetic fields from power transmission lines, while accidental discharges could introduce pollutants into their environment.

=== Stakeholder perspectives ===
US Wind has taken a variety of measures toward facilitating stakeholder engagement throughout the project’s duration. According to the EIS, US Wind has and continues to work with federally recognized Native American tribes, which include: Narragansett Indian Tribe, Shinnecock Indian Nation, Delaware Tribe of Indians, Delaware Nation, Chickahominy Indian Tribe, Chickahominy Indian Tribe-Eastern Division, Monacan Indian Nation, Nansemond Indian Nation, Pamunkey Indian Tribe, Rappahannock Tribe, Upper Mattaponi Indian Tribe, Shawnee Tribe, Eastern Shawnee Tribe of Oklahoma, and the Absentee-Shawnee Tribe of Indians of Oklahoma, as well as state-recognized tribes such as the Lenape Indian Tribe of Delaware and the Nanticoke Indian Association. Their input was utilized to assess how the Proposed Action could influence the pivotal natural, social, and environmental resources utilized by these communities.

Other entities that US Wind has involved throughout the duration of the project include various local fisheries, like Atlantic Tackle and Sunset Provisions. Organizations related to the maritime and shipping industries, environmental NGOs (such as the American Bird Conservancy and the OC Surfrider Foundation), academic institutions and research groups, labor groups, energy industry groups, and a variety of other individuals/organizations form the backbone of US Wind’s stakeholder engagement interactions.

In alignment with the National Environmental Policy Act (NEPA), BOEM must garner public opinions on project concerns as part of the Environmental Review process. Public forums and public comment periods, through in-person and virtual formats, were utilized by BOEM to facilitate this process. Firstly, the Notice of Intent to Prepare a Draft EIS initiated a 30-day public comment period, and the publication of the Draft EIS launched a 45-day public comment period. For every comment, BOEM summarizes and responds based on the information available to them throughout the environmental review process.

This section highlights some core themes brought up during public comment periods from key stakeholders, as well as how BOEM subsequently responded. Following the release of the Notice of Intent of the Draft EIS, the public comment period led to 277 submissions of comments from the online platform Regulations.gov, emails to BOEM representatives, or verbal comments at public meetings. According to the Maryland Offshore Wind Scoping Report, some of the most frequent topics discussed were the NEPA/Public Involvement Process, Recreation and Tourism, Scenic and Visual Resources, and Noise. Complaints pertaining to the NEPA/Public Involvement Process included an inadequate length of time for the comment period, with 90-day periods suggested instead of 30 days. Pertaining to recreation and tourism, comments spanned from concerns about losing visitors and income, particularly in Ocean City, to requesting that US Wind limits construction from taking place during the summer season. Related to scenic and visual resources, concerned stakeholders claimed that the project, particularly the offshore turbines, could damage the landscape and reduce property values. Other commenters called for the turbines being placed 30 miles offshore at minimum, rather than about 10 nautical miles. Comments pertaining to noise touched on concerns about drilling noise from the installation of equipment and infrastructure, and to propose that the turbines are not heard from shore.

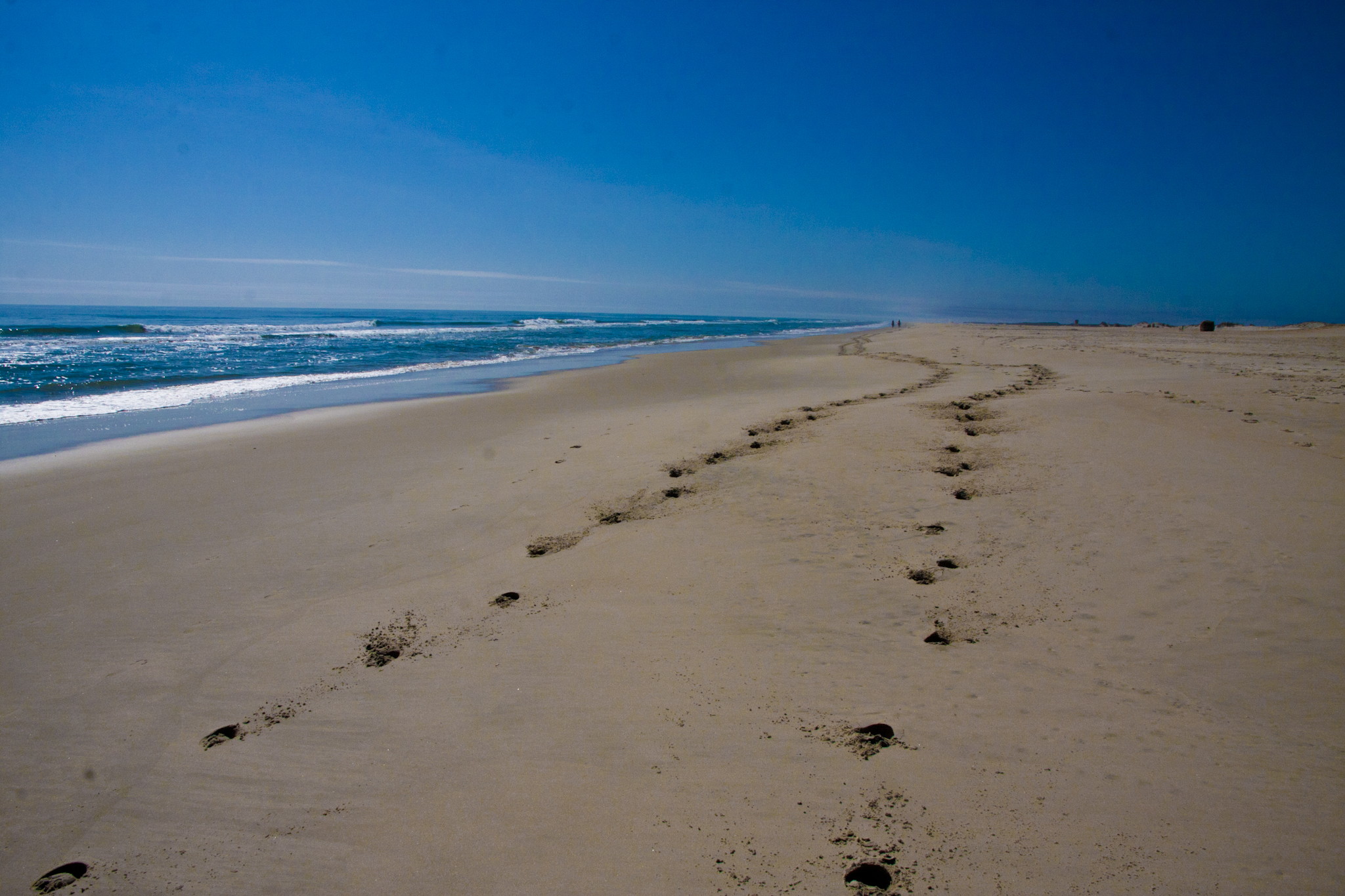
Assateague Island

In October 2024, Ocean City leaders, along with local businesses, filed a lawsuit against BOEM claiming there would be negative impacts on the local environment, as well as the tourism and fishing industries, from the project. Rick Meehan, Ocean City’s Mayor, expressed concern over the local viewshed and that taxpayers may end up having to pay a wind tax. In addition, environmental activists were struck by the discovery of a dead whale on Assateague Island, Maryland in January 2023, leading to some politicians demanding a moratorium on offshore wind pending investigation into the unusual mortality event. Environmental groups, such as the Sierra Club, held a press conference to dispute the narrative that offshore wind farms are to blame for these deaths.

== Current status and future outlook ==
On January 3, 2025, US Wind completed all environmental reviews and permitting for the Maryland Offshore Wind project, clearing a key regulatory hurdle.

However, on January 20, 2025, President Donald Trump issued an executive order temporarily pausing the leasing and permitting for new projects on the Outer Continental Shelf and directing a review of the federal permitting practices for wind projects. The implications of this executive order for the Maryland project remain uncertain, and could initiate a review of US Wind's permits or postpone the development timeline.
