= Skipjack Wind Farm =

Wind farm off the shore of Delaware, US

Skipjack
- Country: United States
- Location: WEA OCS-A 0519; Outer Continental Shelf; Offshore Delaware
- Coordinates: 38.565°N 74.779°W
- Status: Proposed
- Owner: Ørsted US Offshore Wind

Wind farm
- Type: Offshore
- Distance from shore: 19 miles (31 km)
- Rotor diameter: 720 feet (220 meters)

Power generation
- Make and model: Haliade-X 12 MW
- Nameplate capacity: 966 MW

External links
- Website: Ørsted US Offshore Wind

Skipjack is a 966 MW capacity off shore wind farm, proposed by Ørsted US Offshore Wind to be built on the Outer Continental Shelf Offshore Delaware, approximately 16.9 nautical miles (31.3 km; 19.4 mi) from the coast opposite Fenwick Island. It was originally projected that the project, which will provide power to Maryland, would be commissioned in 2022, It is one of the wind farm projects providing wind power to Maryland, the others being MarWin and Momentum Wind.

The initial phase would produce 120 MW. A second project phase was approved by Maryland regulators in December 2021 to have an additional 846 MW. Both will be developed together. In January 2024, the developer "repositioned" the project, temporarily curtailing its construction.

== WEA ==
The project will be built in BOEM-designated Wind Energy Area (WEA) OCS-A 0519, an area of 26,332 acres (10,656 ha) approximately 16.9 nautical miles or 19.5 miles (31.4 km) off the Delaware coast between Indian River Outlet opposite Fenwick Island, north of the Maryland WEA.

== Infrastructure ==
Skipjack will use 10 GE Wind Energy Haliade-X 12 MW turbines, 853 feet (260 m) feet tall with rotors 720 feet (220 m) long (with blades each 351 feet (107 m) long), made in Cherbourg, France. The nacelles are also produced in France.

Ørsted US Offshore Wind will partner with Tradepoint Atlantic, based in Port of Baltimore, to develop a logistics center to create a 50-acre staging center for on-land assembly, storage and loading out into deep waters.

The Port of Paulsboro on the Delaware River in New Jersey could become the site for the production the monopile foundations for turbines.

Ørsted proposed using 1.5 acres of land in Fenwick Island State Park in Delaware as a transmission point, but locals opposed park upgrades to be paid for by the project.

== ORECs ==
The Maryland Public Service Commission has authorized ORECs (offshore wind renewable energy certificates) for both Skipjack and MarWin. ORECs for the second phase were approved in 2021.

== Visibility from shore ==
Residents and business, particularly in Ocean City, Maryland, have raised concerns about the potential of negative impact of building a wind farm offshore, thus creating a landscape that could affect tourism. The turbines have changed in size since the initial proposal by the predecessor of Orsted. They will be 853 feet (260 m) feet tall.

== See also ==
- List of offshore wind farms in the United States
- Ocean Wind
- Wind power in Delaware
- Wind power in Maryland
