= Wind power in Delaware =

Electricity from wind in one U.S. state

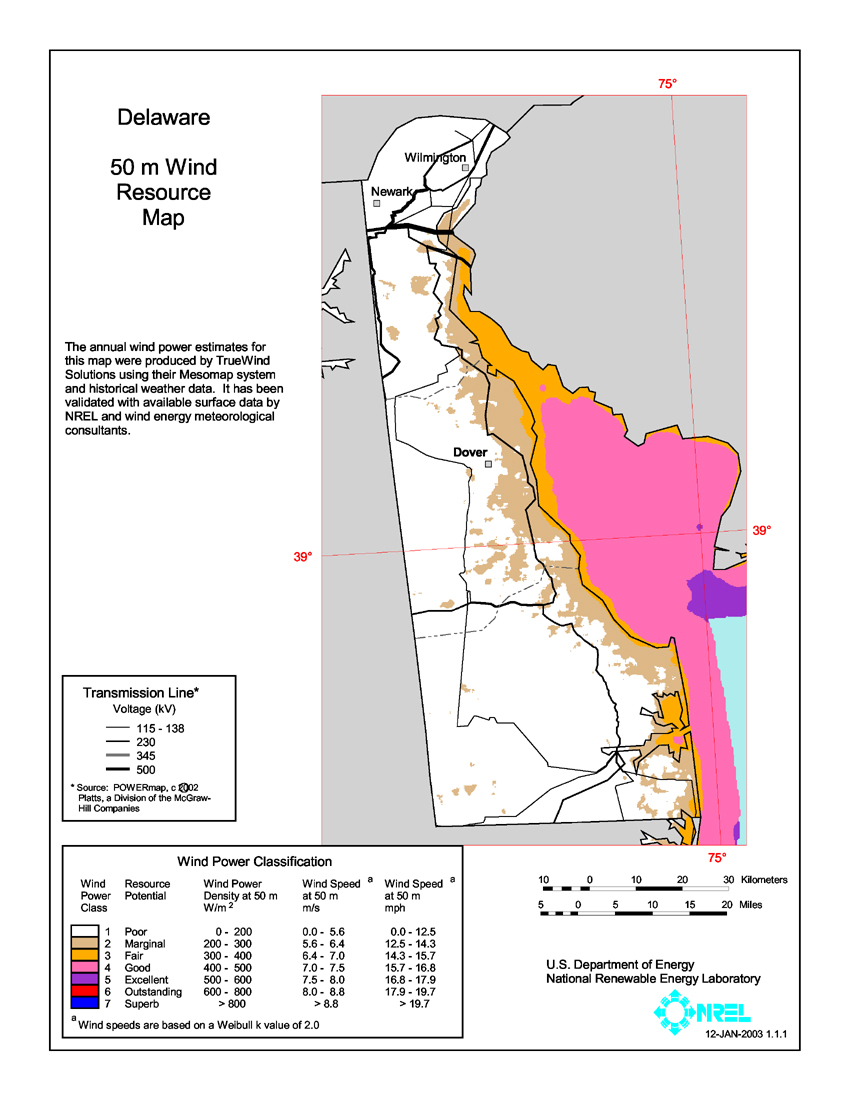
Wind potential in Delaware

The potential of on-shore wind power in Delaware is minimal, having a potential of generating at most 22 GWh/year. Delaware's principal wind potential is from offshore wind. A 2012 assessment estimates that 15,038 MW of offshore wind turbines could generate 60,654 GWh/year. Delaware generated 11,522 GWh from all generating sources in 2011.

2 MW of large scale wind capacity has been constructed in Delaware. A single 256-foot tall, 210-ton turbine at the University of Delaware in Lewes was built in 2010 for generating and educational purposes. It produced 5 GWh of electricity in 2015. There are no projects under construction, but there is a planned offshore wind power project that would produce 120 MW.

The state of Delaware ran a request for proposals (RFP) during 2006–2007 that is notable as the first known RFP, world-wide, in which offshore wind power competed equally against coal and natural gas power alternatives.

== Proposed projects ==
The Delaware Offshore Wind Farm was a proposed project which did not advance. Two other off shore wind farms are proposed for offshore Delaware, one supplying energy to Maryland and the other to New Jersey.

Wind farm	Offshore BOEM wind energy lease area			Coordinates	Capacity (MW)	Developer/utility	Turbines	States	Regulatory agency	Refs
Skipjack	Offshore Delaware; OCS-A 0519	16.9 nautical miles-19.5 miles (31.4 km) from coast opposite area south of Indian River Outlet and Fenwick Island	26,332 acres (10,656 ha)		120MW	Ørsted	GE Wind Energy 10 12MW GE Haliade-X	MD	Maryland PSC	
Garden State Offshore Energy	Offshore Delaware; OC-A 482	opposite Rehoboth Beach between Indian River Outlet and Cape Henlopen				Ørsted		NJ		

== See also ==
- Solar power in Delaware
