= Google Energy =

Subsidiary company of Alphabet

Google Energy LLC
- Industry: Power generation
- Founded: December 16, 2009
- Products: Renewable energy
- Parent: Alphabet Inc.
- Website: environment.google

Google Energy LLC is a subsidiary company of Alphabet Inc., which was created to reduce costs of energy consumption of the Google Group, and subsequently to produce and sell sustainable energy. The division also allows it to take advantage of projects funded through the philanthropic Google.org.

== Operations ==
By 2007 Google had invested a substantial amount of money in wind, solar, solar thermal, and geothermal projects, including a 1.6 MW solar installation pilot project at its headquarters. In 2010 Google Energy made its first investment in a renewable-energy project, putting up $38.8 million for two wind farms in North Dakota. The company announced that the two locations will generate 169.5 MW of power, or enough to supply 55,000 homes. The farms, which were developed by NextEra Energy Resources, will reduce fossil fuel use in the region. NextEra Energy Resources sold Google a twenty percent stake in the project in order to get funding for project development. In addition, on July 30, 2010, Google Energy agreed to purchase 114 MW of Iowa wind energy from NextEra Energy at a fixed rate for 20 years. The corporation plans to primarily use the electricity for Google's data centers, but it may also be sold on the open market.

In 2010 Google Energy, together with a group of other investors, announced a plan to build the Atlantic Wind Connection, an undersea cable off the Atlantic coast to connect future offshore wind farms with on-shore transmission grids. The project ran into financial issues as the low cost of natural gas made large scale offshore wind uncompetitive.

In April 2011, Google extended its partnership with NextEra by signing a 20-year power purchase agreement (PPA) for its Minco II Wind Energy Center. As of 2011, the 100.8-megawatt wind farm is being developed in the Grady and Caddo counties near Minco.

Google invested two rounds in SolarCity, $280 million in 2011 and $300 million in 2015.

On September 17, 2013, the corporation announced its plan to purchase all of the electricity produced by the 240-megawatt Happy Hereford wind farm that will be located near Amarillo, Texas, US upon the completion of the farm's construction. Purchased from the wind farms owners Chermac Energy, Google Energy will sell the electricity from Happy Hereford into the wholesale market in Oklahoma, the location of one of its data centers.

As of 2024, Google (through its parent company Alphabet) has signed over 22 GW of clean-energy generation capacity in more than 170 agreements to power its data centers.

== DeepMind integration ==
Google has used DeepMind AI to optimize the production of energy from its wind farms to overcome this energy source's inherent variability, and applied this to 700 MW of wind power capacity. DeepMind trained a neural network on weather forecasts and past turbine data, so it could predict power output 36 hours ahead. Based on this, the model recommends how to allocate power to the grid a full day in advance. This boosted the "value" of Google's wind farms by about 20%, it claimed, though it did not specify what form that value takes, or how it's measured. While only described as built and tested internally, as of 2019, there was noted potential to sell this technology to wind farm operators.

== Authorization to buy and sell energy ==
In February 2010, the Federal Energy Regulatory Commission FERC granted Google an authorization to buy and sell energy at market rates. The order specifically states that Google Energy—a subsidiary of Google—holds the rights "for the sale of energy, capacity, and ancillary services at market-based rates", but acknowledges that neither Google Energy nor its affiliates "own or control any generation or transmission" facilities.

== See also ==
- Google PowerMeter, a Google service that was discontinued in 2011.
