= Walter Cruickshank =

American governmental official

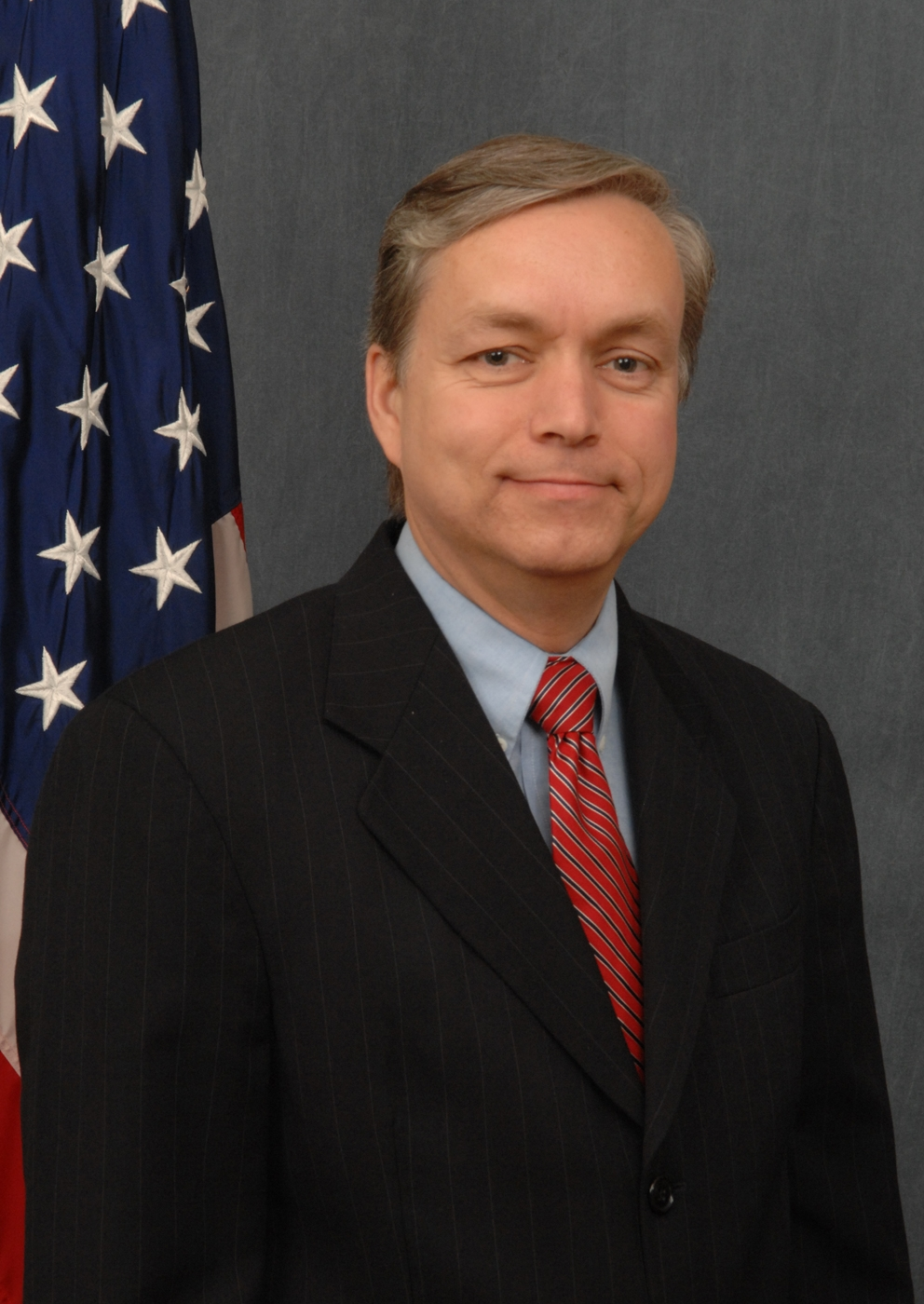
- Official portrait, 2011

Acting United States Secretary of the Interior
- In office January 20, 2025 – February 1, 2025
- President: Donald Trump
- Preceded by: Deb Haaland
- Succeeded by: Doug Burgum

Acting Director of the Minerals Management Service
- In office January 2009 – July 2009
- President: Barack Obama
- Preceded by: Randall Luthi
- Succeeded by: S. Elizabeth Birnbaum
- In office June 2007 – July 2007
- President: George W. Bush
- Preceded by: Johnnie Burton
- Succeeded by: Randall Luthi

Personal details
- Education: Cornell University (BS); Pennsylvania State University (MS, PhD)

Walter Cruickshank is an American government official who served as deputy director of the Bureau of Ocean Energy Management. He served as Acting Secretary of the Interior from January 20, 2025, to February 1, 2025.

== Education and career ==
Cruickshank earned a bachelor's degree from Cornell University, and a Doctor of Philosophy in minerals management from Pennsylvania State University.

He was named deputy director of the Minerals Management Service in April 2002, and Cruickshank served as acting director between during June–July 2007 and January–July 2009.

In 2011, the Minerals Management Service was broken up into three agencies, including the Bureau of Ocean Energy Management, of which Cruickshank became deputy director at its inception until June 2025. Cruickshank served as its acting director from May 2014 to January 2015, and again from January 2017 to February 2021. He also served as Acting Secretary of the Interior from January 20, 2025, to February 1, 2025. He retired in June 2025.

Political offices
Preceded by Deb Haaland	United States Secretary of the Interior; Acting; 2025	Succeeded by Doug Burgum
