= Ørsted US Offshore Wind =

Offshore wind energy development group

Ørsted U.S. Offshore Wind
- Industry: Renewable Energy Solutions
- Founded: 2019
- Successor
- Headquarters: Boston, Massachusetts and Providence, Rhode Island, U.S.
- Area served: East Coast of the United States
- Products: Offshore wind power
- Number of employees: 150 (2019)

Ørsted U.S. Offshore Wind is an offshore wind energy development group that is affiliated with Ørsted, a Danish firm. It is joint headquartered in Boston, Massachusetts and Providence, Rhode Island. As of 2019, it was involved in some of the largest offshore wind farm projects in the United States.

== Deepwater Wind ==
Deepwater Wind
- Industry: Renewable Energy Solutions
- Founded: 2007
- Successor
- Headquarters: Providence, Rhode Island
- Area served: United States
- Products: Wind turbines
- Website: dwwind.com

Incorporated as Deepwater Wind, LLC of Providence, Rhode Island, the company's major investors include First Wind, a developer of land-based wind projects in the United States; D.E. Shaw & Co., a capital investment firm with energy sector experience; and Ospraie Management, an asset management firm interested in alternative energy markets. It was acquired by Ørsted in 2019.

In November 2017, Deepwater Wind pledged to fund a $1 million commitment towards the University of Massachusetts Dartmouth's School for Marine Science and Technology (SMAST) and the Massachusetts Marine Fisheries Institute (MFI). The funding went towards Blue Economy Initiative, a project led by SMAST and the MFI in order to conduct thorough research on the relations between wild fisheries and offshore wind development, with a focus on commercial fishing activities, over a five-year period.

=== Block Island Wind Farm ===
The concept was set forth in a plan offered by then Rhode Island Governor Donald L. Carcieri in 2006. The aim of the Carcieri plan was to develop large-scale offshore wind projects in the south-eastern New England region of the United States, and in the State of Rhode Island, in a bid to diversify Rhode Island's power supply with renewable energy sources. In June 2007, the Rhode Island Office of Energy Resources determined ten sites in the region of ocean within the boundaries of Rhode Island and Providence Plantations.

On September 25, 2008, Governor Carcieri announced that Deepwater Wind was chosen as the successful developer to construct both a test site and the finalized plan for the wind power project – the Block Island Wind Farm – off New Shoreham. The ocean facility is planned to provide 1.3 million megawatt hours per year of renewable energy at its completion — 15 percent of all electricity used in the state.

In 2009, Deepwater signed an agreement with National Grid to sell the power from the $200-million USD, 30-MW wind farm off Block Island, at an initial price of 24.4 ¢ USD/kW·h.

Block Island Wind Farm was commissioned in December 2016.

== Projects ==
| Wind farm | Offshore BOEM wind energy lease area | | | States | Coordinates | Capacity (MW) | Turbines | Developer/Utility | Regulatory agency | Status | Ref. |
|---|---|---|---|---|---|---|---|---|---|---|---|
| Block Island Wind Farm | Offshore Rhode Island OCS-A 0486 (North Lease Area) | 3.3 nautical miles (6.1 km; 3.8 mi) southeast of Block Island | | RI | 41°06′52.96″N 71°31′16.18″W | 30 | 5 x 6MW Alstom Haliade 150 | Deepwater Wind (now Ørsted US Offshore Wind) | | Operational | |
| Ocean Wind 1 | Offshore New Jersey OCS-A 0498 (NJWEA South) | 13 nautical miles (15 mi; 24 km) east of Atlantic City (NJ) | 160,480 acres (64,940 ha) | NJ | 39.366111°N 74.414167°W | 1,100 | 90 Haliade-X 12 MW | Ørsted PSEG | NJBPU | | |
| Ocean Wind 2 | Offshore New Jersey OCS-A 0532 (NJWEA South) | 13 nautical miles-15 miles (24 km) east of Atlantic City (NJ) | 160,480 acres (64,940 ha) | NJ | | 1,148 | | Ørsted | NJBPU | | |
| Sunrise Wind | Offshore Massachusetts & Rhode Island; OCS-A 0486 (North Lease Area) | 26 nautical miles (30 mi; 48 km) east of Montauk Point, Long Island (NY) & 16.6 nautical miles (19.1 mi; 30.7 km) southeast of Block Island (RI) | 97,498 acres (39,456 ha) | NY | | 880 | Siemens Gamesa SG 8.0–167 | Ørsted; Eversource; Con Ed Transmission; New York Power Authority | NYSERDA | | |
| Revolution Wind | Offshore Rhode Island; OCS-A 0486 (North Lease Area) | halfway between Montauk Point (NY) & Martha’s Vineyard (MA) | 97,498 acres (39,456 ha) | RI; CT | | 700 | Siemens Gamesa 8MW SG 8.0–167 | Ørsted; Eversource; National Grid; United Illuminating | Connecticut DEEP; Rhode Island PUC | | |
| South Fork | Massachusetts & Rhode Island; OCS-A 0486 (North Lease Area) | 26 nautical miles (30 mi; 48 km) southeast of Montauk Point, Long Island (NY) & 16.6 nautical miles (19.1 mi; 30.7 km) southeast of Block Island (RI) | 97,498 acres (39,456 ha) | NY | | 130 | 8 Siemens Gamesa SG 8.0–167 | Ørsted; Eversource; Long Island Power Authority | NYSERDA | | |
| Skipjack | Offshore Delaware; OCS-A 0519 | 16.9 nautical miles (19.4 mi; 31.3 km) from Maryland coast and Delaware state line | 26,332 acres (10,656 ha) | MD | | 120 | 10 12MW GE Haliade-X | Ørsted | Maryland PSC | | |
| Coastal Virginia Offshore Wind – Pilot Project | Offshore Virginia; OCS-A 0497 | 25 nautical miles east of Cape Henry (VA) | 2,135 acres (864 ha) | VA | 36°53′30″N 75°29′30″W | 12 | 2 x 6MW; Siemens Gamesa SWT-6.0–154 | Ørsted; Dominion Energy | Virginia Department of Mines Minerals and Energy (DMME); BOEM | Operational | |
| Coastal Virginia Offshore Wind | Offshore Virginia; OCS-A 0483 | 25 to 35 nautical miles east of Cape Henry (VA) | 112,799 acres (45,648 ha) | VA | 36.9°N 75.38°W | 2640 | TBA | Dominion Energy | BOEM | | |

== BOEM leases ==
Ørsted also has BOEM leases offshore Massachusetts and Delaware/New Jersey:

- Bay State Wind: Approx. 2GW offshore wind site off the coast of Massachusetts in conjunctions with Eversource Energy
- Garden State Offshore Energy: An up to 1.2GW offshore wind site off the coasts of Delaware and New Jersey. Owned in a 50–50 joint venture with PSEG.

== See also ==
- Wind power in the United States
- List of offshore wind farms in the United States
- List of offshore wind farms
- List of onshore wind farms
