= Google PowerMeter =

Former software project by Google

Google PowerMeter logo

Google PowerMeter was a software project of Google's philanthropic arm, Google.org, to help consumers track their home electricity usage. It was launched on October 5, 2009, and ended on September 16, 2011. The development of the software was part of an effort by Google to invest in renewable energy, electricity grid upgrades, and other measures that would reduce greenhouse gas emissions. The software was designed to record the user's electricity usage in near real-time. Google partnered with various companies during the project.

== Description ==
Google PowerMeter was a software project of Google's philanthropic arm, Google.org. The software was designed to help consumers track their home electricity usage. It was launched on October 5, 2009. The software was designed to record the user's electricity usage in near real-time. In June 2011 Google announced the service would cease, which it did on September 16, 2011.

== Purpose ==
The development of the software was part of an effort by Google to invest in renewable energy, electricity grid upgrades, and other measures that would reduce greenhouse gas emissions. It was hoped that this tool would raise the home-owner's awareness of how much energy they use and make users more energy efficient. PowerMeter was intended for use with smart meters able to track electricity usage in more detail than standard electric meters. Some other types of electricity meters and in-home energy use displays could also be used with PowerMeter.

=== Analysis ===
According to the company, if half of America's homes' energy use was cut by ten percent, it would equal the average energy used by eight million cars. According to Google, in 2009 there were approximately 40 million smart meters in use worldwide. By early 2009, approximately 7% of US homes had a smart meter installed.

== Partnerships ==
In May 2009, Google announced that it had partners with smart meter maker Itron. In October 2009 Google PowerMeter announced their first "device partner", The Energy Detective (TED 5000), an energy monitor from Energy Inc then only available only in North America, and their first UK partnership which was with AlertMe. Also in 2009, Yello Strom customers in Germany were able to begin adding the PowerMeter widget to their iGoogle pages to track their energy usage.

In 2010 UK company Current Cost announced a collaboration with Google PowerMeter. San Diego Gas and Electric's Sempra Energy company announced plans to install 1.4 million smart meters in San Diego County and Southern Orange County by the end of 2011 and said that after they sent out 100,000 post cards to let consumers know they could use the Google PowerMeter service, about 6% had started to use it.

== See also ==
- Google Energy
- Cent-a-meter
- Energy management software
- Hohm
- Kill A Watt
- Nonintrusive load monitoring
