= Block Island Wind Farm =

Offshore wind farm in Rhode Island, USA

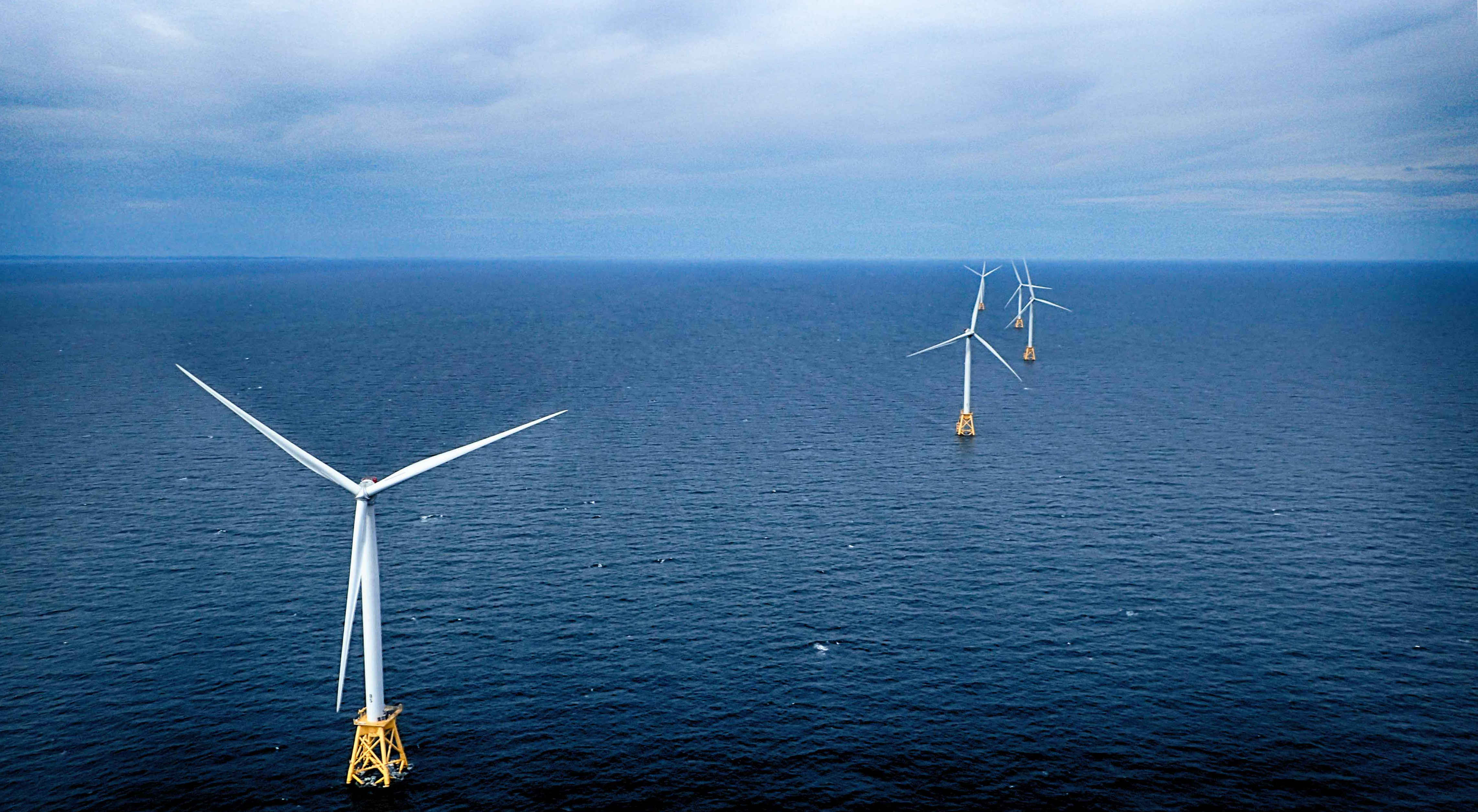
- Aerial view
- Country: United States
- Location: New Shoreham, Rhode Island
- Coordinates: 41°06′53″N 71°31′16″W
- Status: Operational
- Construction began: 2015
- Commission date: 12 December 2016
- Construction cost: $290 million
- Owner: Ørsted US Offshore Wind

Wind farm
- Type: Offshore
- Distance from shore: 3.8 mi (6.1 km)
- Hub height: 100 m
- Rotor diameter: 150 m (490 ft)
- Rated wind speed: 3–25 m/s

Power generation
- Units operational: 5 × 6 MW
- Make and model: GE Renewable Energy Haliade 150-6MW (5)
- Nameplate capacity: 30 MW
- Capacity factor: 47.6% (projected)
- Annual net output: 125 GW·h

External links
- Website: us.orsted.com/renewable-energy-solutions/offshore-wind/block-island-wind-farm
- Commons: Related media on Commons

Block Island Wind Farm is the first commercial offshore wind farm in the United States, located 3.8 mi (6.1 km) from Block Island, Rhode Island in the Atlantic Ocean. The five-turbine, 30 MW project was developed by Deepwater Wind, now known as Ørsted US Offshore Wind.

Construction began in 2015, and in late summer 2016, five Alstom Haliade 150-6MW turbines were erected. Operations were launched in December 2016. It is the largest project using wind power in Rhode Island.

== Design and capacity ==
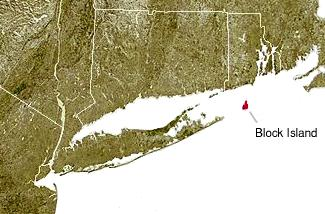
Location of Block Island

Block Island Wind Farm was originally a project of Deepwater Wind to be located about 3.3 nmi (6.1 km; 3.8 mi) southeast of Block Island, which was expected to produce more than 125,000 megawatt hours of electricity annually. As of September 2006, it has never reached that level of electricity production. In 2021, 2023, 2024, and 2025 it produced less than 100,000 megawatt hours of electricity. Power is transmitted from the turbines to the electric grid along a 21 mi (34 km) transmission submarine power cable buried under the ocean floor, making landfall north of Scarborough Beach in Narragansett, Rhode Island. The structures were designed by Alstom Wind, stand 600 ft (180 m) high, and can withstand a Category 3 storm. The system connects New Shoreham, Rhode Island (coterminous with Block Island) to the electrical power grid for the first time, allowing it to transition from using diesel generators.

== Permits and funding ==
The Block Island Wind Farm was conceived as a larger project extending into neighboring Massachusetts to build a $1.5-billion, 385-megawatt wind farm in federal waters. The 100-turbine project could provide 1.3 terawatt-hours (TW·h) of electricity per year – 15 percent of all electricity used in the state. In 2009, the State of Rhode Island designated Deepwater Wind to begin with pilot projects. In the same year, Deepwater signed an agreement with National Grid to sell the power from the wind farm off Block Island, at an initial price of 24.4¢/kWh, with a guaranteed 3.5% annual increase.

The permitting process for the project has been highly controversial, with the Rhode Island Public Utilities Commission (RIPUC) initially rejecting the agreement price with National Grid as being excessive to Rhode Island's electricity ratepayers. However, after the Rhode Island General Assembly and Governor Carcieri changed the state law concerning the "commercial reasonability" of contract pricing, the RIPUC voted to approve the key contract. After continuing controversy and appeals, the Rhode Island Supreme Court ruled in July 2011 to uphold the RIPUC decision. Opponents of the project raised an issue about the contract pricing with the United States Federal Energy Regulatory Commission (FERC) in August 2012, but in October of the same year, FERC issued a decision that they would not act on the complaint. A total of nine reviews and permits from state federal agencies were acquired, the last in early May 2015. On May 11, 2015, a new complaint was filed with FERC, alleging that the power purchase agreement with National Grid violates the Public Utilities Regulatory Policy Act of 1978 and that the RIPUC violated the Federal Power Act and the Supremacy Clause of the U.S. Constitution. However, Deepwater Wind maintained that there was no support for any of these claims and that FERC should promptly deny the new complaint in its entirety.

While the wind turbines have been built in state waters southeast of Block Island, the transmission cable crosses federal waters in the Atlantic. A portion of the power is supplied directly to Block Island, 13 miles (21 km) off-shore from the Rhode Island mainland and has some of the highest power rates in the country due to its local generation by small diesel-powered generators.

Deepwater Wind announced in March 2015 that it had received funding in the amount of $290 million from mandated lead arrangers Société Générale of Paris, France and KeyBank National Association of Cleveland, Ohio. The farm design was verified in 2017.

== Construction ==
In late 2014, Gulf Island Fabrication, Inc. began steelwork construction at its Houma, Louisiana shipyard. The building phase focused on the turbines' foundations (for platforms) to be pile-anchored to the ocean floor. On June 26, 2015, the first of the five foundations for the project began its move from Louisiana via barge. The turbines were expected to be delivered later in 2015 and erected in place in 2016. Foundation assembly started in ProvPort in March 2016, with commissioning estimated to be done late 2016. GZA GeoEnvironmental provided the geotechnical design and consulting for the staging facility at the Port of Providence.

The foundations were designed by Louisiana-based Keystone Engineering Inc. to withstand a 1,000-year storm. While the four-pile jacket foundation is common for offshore oil and gas platforms, Block Island's jackets are engineered to handle additional loading and vibration from the spinning turbines. Keystone's engineering team ran thousands of test simulations, repeating each calculation multiple times to ensure the design would hold up under various weather conditions and load scenarios. Altogether, nearly 10 million tests were completed.

Louisiana offshore oil and gas service providers played an important role in constructing the Block Island Wind Farm. US-flagged operator Falcon Global used its lift barge “The Robert” to assist foreign operators and other coastwise-qualified vessels. The boat travelled about 2,000 miles from Louisiana to Block Island over the course of 14 days and 14 nights.

On March 9, 2015, French company Alstom received final notification to begin fabrication of five Alstom Haliade 150 6 MW offshore wind turbines. GE Wind Energy acquired Alstom Wind and Haliade production in November 2015. As of July 2016, the site was grid-connected, and towers and LM Wind Power blades were in the port of Providence. The Norwegian installation jack-up vessel was on its way to France to pick up the 400 tonne generators, as it was not able to pick them up from an easier US port due to the Jones Act. A test version of the direct-drive turbine is installed at Østerild Wind Turbine Test Field.

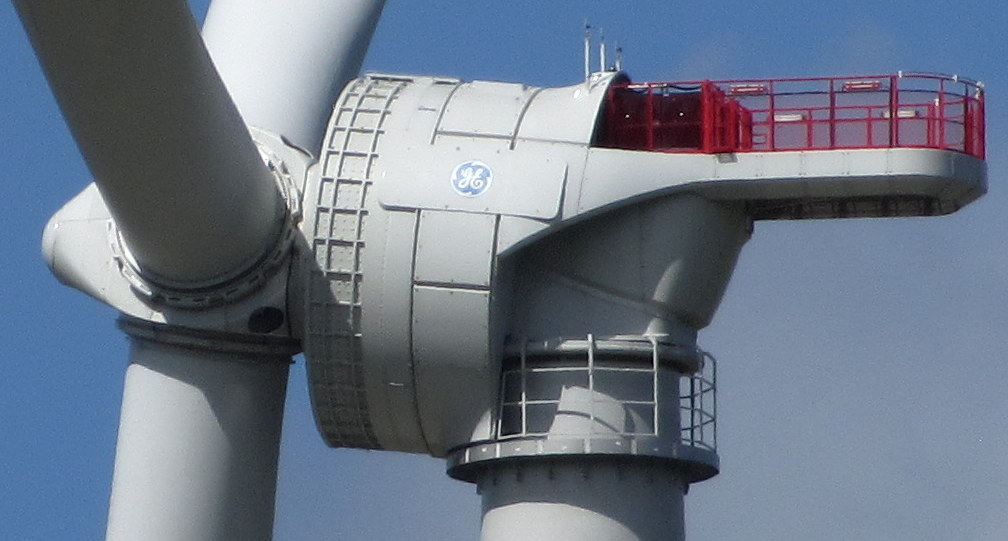
Close-up of GE–Alstom 150-6MW at Østerild, 2017

The first turbine was erected in August 2016. On August 18, 2016, Deepwater Wind CEO Jeffrey Grybowski announced Block Island Wind Farm was fully constructed. The wind farm commenced commercial operation in December 2016.

In September 2026, a wreck believed to be the F/V Mistress, a fishing vessel that sank near Block Island in 2019, was located approximately 50 feet (15 m) from one of the wind farm's turbines.

== Operation ==
During a major winter storm in March 2017, the turbines functioned as designed, automatically cutting out when the wind speed reached 55 mph (25 m/s). After the wind speed had topped out at about 69 mph (31 m/s), they resumed production again once the speed went below the cut-off threshold.

The project also provided jobs for the state of Rhode Island, employing welders, workers during assembly of the wind turbines, and divers.

Since its construction, the project site has undergone regularly scheduled maintenance. According to the company, much of these repairs happen in the summer. U.S.-flagged liftboats are used on the project site to both provide accommodations for workers and serve as a platform for performing routine maintenance.

The Block Island Wind Farm has experienced multiple issues, causing it to fail to perform on some occasions. Problems include turbine stress fatigue on four of the five turbines and erosion exposing the underwater cables that took the power to the mainland. The combination of the issues resulted in extensive shutdowns in the summer of 2021 for repairs and safety inspections. Four of the five wind turbines at the farm were offline for at least two months.

Island residents generally welcomed the activation of the wind farm and the grid connection. Power on Block Island had previously been provided by diesel generators, which created soot that dirtied neighbors' curtains, and noise that blotted out birdsong. Electricity costs dropped by about a third with the switch from shipped-in diesel to grid power. The fuel switch prompted local utility to sell to its own customers and become a cooperative. Starting in November 2025, the Block Island Utility District does not procure any electricity from the wind farm and instead purchases 100% renewable energy from other resources.

== See also ==
- List of offshore wind farms in the United States
