= Bluewater Wind =

Energy company on the North Atlantic coast of the USA

Bluewater Wind is an energy company on the North Atlantic Coast, United States, and in the Great Lakes Region, United States, developing offshore wind energy projects. Bluewater's staff has experience in the wind, energy, environmental, finance, public policy, and marine sectors. Bluewater Wind was part of the Babcock & Brown family of companies. and become part of NRG Energy.

In response to public requests, Bluewater selects offshore locations, conducts environmental studies and assesses wind resources. In addition, Bluewater selects contractors who plan connection to the grid and arrange for delivery of the energy to customers. Lastly, Bluewater secures financing early on in the development process to see the project through from concept to decommissioning.

== The Bluewater philosophy ==
Every new project begins with information transparency early on in project development, discourse with local stakeholders and voluntary project modifications in response to public input. The company engages with local environmental, trade, union, community, and academic organizations in order to assess the needs and wants of the community.

For example, the companies level of public engagement led to the scrutiny of one potential project site located in the Delaware Bay during the summer of 2007. Local bird protection organizations were concerned about the impact that the wind turbines would have on the migratory pattern of the birds that fly over the bay. The organizations provided evidence of their concerns and explained to Bluewater project management the real costs involved with the site. As a result, the company ceased developments for that site.

== Projects ==
Bluewater Wind is an offshore wind energy developer, with the only offshore wind energy power purchase agreements (PPAs) in the U.S. and two permits to install meteorological towers on the outer continental shelf for the company's North Atlantic Coast projects. As such, Bluewater is executing projects in Delaware, New York, New Jersey, Rhode Island and has begun expanding project development opportunities into the Great Lakes.

The Delaware Offshore Wind Farm was a proposed offshore wind farm project, to be situated off the Delaware coast Delmarva Power of Delaware agreed to purchase 200 megawatts of power from a large wind farm to be operated by Bluewater Wind offshore from Rehoboth Beach, Delaware. Originally planned to be 600 MW, the Delaware project is expected to be built as 200 MW initially, and is frequently referred to as the Bluewater Wind Park, although Bluewater Wind is also planning wind parks in four other states, New York, New Jersey, Maryland, and Rhode Island. Environmental information, including environmental impact statements, for the Delaware Offshore Wind Farm are published by the Aeorads Company, an information technology company. The Delaware project was located in the same area as the Atlantic Wind Connection proposed by Google and others.

Bluewater Wind handled port logistics for Coastal Virginia Offshore Wind.

== See also ==
- Wind power in the United States
- List of offshore wind farms in the United States
- List of wind farms
- List of offshore wind farms
- Lists of offshore wind farms by country
