= US Wind =

Wind energy company

- Industry: Renewable energy
- Founded: 2011
- Headquarters: Baltimore, Maryland, U.S.
- Area served: East Coast of the United States
- Products: Offshore wind power
- Owner: Renexia SpA
- Parent: Toto Holdings
- Website: US Wind

US Wind is an offshore wind energy development company founded in 2011. US Wind is owned by funds managed by Apollo Global Management, an American investment firm, and Renexia SpA, a subsidiary of Toto Holding SpA. It is headquartered in Baltimore, Maryland. Since 2014, it has been involved in offshore wind farm projects in the United States.

== Activities ==
On December 1, 2014 US Wind won the auction for 25-year leases for two Wind Energy Areas (WEA) (OCS-A 0489, and OCS-A 0490) established by the Bureau of Ocean Energy Management (BOEM) with a bid of $8.7 million. On March 1, 2018, the two lease areas were administratively merged into a single lease area referred to as OCS-A 0490. On May 11, 2017, US Wind won an Offshore Renewable Energy Credit (OREC) award from the Maryland Public Service Commission, enabling it to develop 248 megawatts (MW) of offshore wind in its lease area. This is referred to as the MarWin project. On December 17, 2021, US Wind won an OREC award from the Maryland PSC enabling it to develop 808.5 MW of offshore wind. This second award is referred to as the Momentum Wind project. Both projects are proposed to be developed in the merged lease area OCS-A 0490.

Both phases were approved by Bureau of Ocean Energy Management in September 2024. Onshore construction may begin in 2025 after remaining state permits are received.

US Wind has committed to the development of a wind port and steel factory at Tradepoint Atlantic in Sparrows Point, Maryland.

The company had also acquired a lease for the New Jersey WEA North, which it later sold. It also pursuing WEA leases in South Carolina.

In January 2025 US Wind reached an agreement with the state of Delaware to provide $40 million in community benefits in return for renewable energy credits and underground transmission cable siting at coastal state parks.

== Projects ==
| Wind farm | Offshore BOEM wind energy lease area | | | Coordinates | Capacity (MW) | Developer/Utility | Turbines | Receiving state | State regulatory agency | References |
|---|---|---|---|---|---|---|---|---|---|---|
| MarWin | Offshore Maryland; OCS-A 0490 | 17 nautical miles -20 miles (32 km) east of Ocean City (MD) | 79,707 acres (32,256 ha) | | 248 | US Wind | 22 | MD | Maryland PSC | |
| Momentum Wind | Offshore Maryland; OCS-A 0490 | 17 nautical miles -20 miles (32 km) east of Ocean City (MD) | 79,707 acres (32,256 ha) | | 1200 | US Wind | 82 | MD | Maryland PSC | |

== See also ==
- List of offshore wind farms in the United States
- Wind power in Maryland
