= Atlantic Wind Connection =

Proposed electrical transmission backbone in the United States

Location
- From: Northeastern New Jersey
- Passes through: South Jersey; Delaware; Maryland
- To: Norfolk, Virginia

Ownership information
- Owner: Trans-Elect Development Company
- Partners: Google Energy; Good Energies; Marubeni

Technical information
- Type: offshore cable
- Total length: 350 mi (560 km)
- Capacity: 6,000 MW

Atlantic Wind Connection (AWC) was a proposed electrical transmission backbone by Trans-Elect Development Company that could be constructed off the East Coast of the United States to service off-shore wind farms. Google Energy, the investment firm Good Energies, and Japanese trading firm Marubeni announced that they were investing "tens of millions of dollars" in the initial development stage of what could become a $5 billion project. Financing for the project never lined up, reportedly because the low cost of natural gas made large scale offshore wind uncompetitive.

The project continued to move forward as of May 2012 and in January, 2013 with plans to build the first segment off New Jersey.

== Project description ==
The Atlantic Wind Connection would begin with a first phase that would connect population and power transmission hubs in southern New Jersey and Rehoboth Beach, Delaware, the site of a proposed offshore wind project with a Power Purchase Agreement. Power would be carried with a cable placed in trenches on the seabed 20 miles (30 km) offshore. With an estimated cost of $1.7 billion, 170-mile (270 km) phase one would begin construction in 2015. The remaining southern connection to Norfolk, Virginia and an extension to Gateway Region of northern New Jersey and New York City would bring total construction costs to $5 billion and could be completed by 2021. The lead partners Google and Good Energies would each own 37.5% of the project, while Marubeni would have a 15% share.

The project was proposed to deliver power ashore in southern Virginia, Maryland, Delaware, southern New Jersey and northern New Jersey using 350 miles (560 km) of cable as a backbone that could be used by wind power systems built miles off of the Atlantic Ocean coast. Initially the system could be used to transport electricity from southern Virginia, where it is cheap, to the New York City area, where it is comparatively expensive. The system would be able to transmit 6,000 megawatts of power and would allow existing energy supplies in Virginia to be transmitted north, bypassing the congested energy grid that exists in the Northeast, in an area that has been identified as one of the most congested portions of the National Interest Electric Transmission Corridor. The system's energy transmission capacity would be a "superhighway for clean energy" to serve approximately 1.9 million households, equal to 60% of the wind energy generation capacity that existed in the United States as of 2009. Once the backbone is constructed, wind farms constructed well off the coast and almost invisible from the shore could be constructed and tap into the backbone. By constructing the cable beyond the 3-mile (4.8 km) limit where states wield authority, the system would be under the federal jurisdiction of the United States Department of the Interior.

== Initial phase off New Jersey ==
As of January, 2013 a proposal to seek approval for construction of the initial leg off New Jersey was announced. Construction of this phase responds to a need to equalize power costs between southern and northern New Jersey, provide statutorily required renewable energy, and, by limiting the project to one state, simplify regulatory and permitting issues. Construction of the 189 mile project, which would stretch from the vicinity of Jersey City to near Atlantic City, would begin in 2015 if regulatory approval was obtained. On January 17, 2013, Atlantic Wind Connection announced it had selected Bechtel as the EPC contractor and Alstom as technical advisor for the first phase of the development. Studies completed in 2012 concluded that a new marine terminal at the Port of Paulsboro is well suited to become a center for the manufacture, assembly, and transport of wind turbines to be used to further the development of wind power in New Jersey.

== Opinions ==
The proposed system has been praised by environmentalists and federal regulators, with Jon Wellinghoff, chairman of the Federal Energy Regulatory Commission (FERC) calling it "one of the most interesting transmission projects that I've ever seen walk through the door", saying that the system "provides a gathering point for offshore wind for multiple projects up and down the coast." Former FERC chairman James J. Hoecker, who heads a group that represents power transmission system owners called the proposal "a necessary piece of what the Eastern governors have been talking about in terms of taking advantage of offshore wind" and noted that the system would help average out the variable output of wind farms. Google's director of its green business operations group, Richard L. Needham, called the project "an opportunity to kick-start this industry and, long term, provide a way for the mid-Atlantic states to meet their renewable energy goals." Melinda Pierce of the Sierra Club said that she had opposed other power line projects but would support the Atlantic Wind Connection, as "These kinds of audacious ideas might just be what we need to break through the wretched logjam".

The concept of an offshore transmission backbone coordinated with several projects was an item in a speech by Secretary of the Interior Ken Salazar a week before AWC was announced, and the concept is also a part of the national strategy on offshore wind power.

== Challenges ==
However, as the first such project of this nature, it poses significant risks of encountering unexpected technological challenges, bureaucratic backlogs and cost overruns. Virginia politicians have opposed previous proposals that would send low-cost energy out of the state. PJM Interconnection, the regional transmission organization that covers the area and is the world's largest competitive wholesale electricity market, would need to develop a formula to assess its customers for the costs associated with hooking up the new cables, increasing grid capacity and making the system more reliable.

== Resource area ==
The project would take advantage of the fact that the continental shelf slopes rather gradually in the Atlantic Ocean and that it would not be exposed to the freezing temperatures characteristic of the Great Lakes. The Mid-Atlantic Bight offers the potential of 60,000 megawatts of wind power generating capacity in an area that has relatively little renewable energy potential from other sources.

The resource area, the Mid-Atlantic Bight, was identified and mapped in 2006 by Willett M. Kempton of the University of Delaware, and again in 2008 in the Journal of Marine Research. Twenty-one years of hourly data from National Oceanic and Atmospheric Administration buoy anemometers show an extrapolated mean wind speed of 8.3 m/s at 80 m height, giving a capacity factor of 39% for oceanic turbines (36% for coastal). A single offshore site had zero wind 15% of the time. Considering three connected offshore sites in a larger area between North Carolina (34° N) and Massachusetts (43° N), zero power occurred 2% of the time. For six connected offshore sites, zero power occurred 0.3% of the time. Baseload fossil fuel generating plants are typically unavailable 6% of the time. The principal difference is that wind power is a non-dispatchable resource, not that it is "unreliable".

== See also ==
- Ocean Wind
