= Bureau of Ocean Energy Management =

US Water Energy Agency

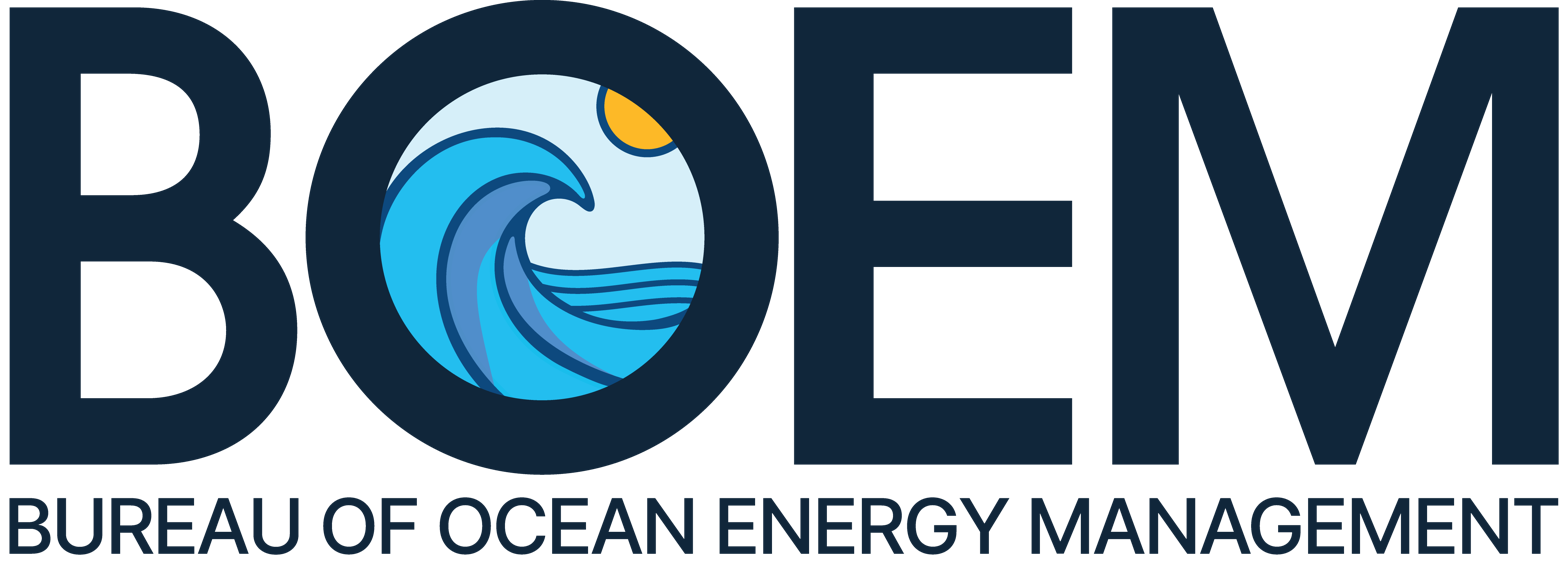

Agency overview
- Formed: October 1, 2011
- Preceding agency: Minerals Management Service
- Dissolved: July 10, 2026
- Superseding agency: Marine Minerals Administration
- Headquarters: Main Interior Building Washington, D.C.
- Employees: 610
- Annual budget: US$212 m (2024)
- Agency executive: Mike Olsen, Acting Director
- Parent agency: Department of the Interior
- Website: www.boem.gov

The Bureau of Ocean Energy Management (BOEM) was an agency within the United States Department of the Interior, established in 2010 by secretarial order. BOEM was a small agency tasked with managing approximately 3.2 billion acres of the seabed.

On May 19, 2010, Secretary of the Interior Ken Salazar signed a secretarial order dividing the Minerals Management Service (MMS) into three independent entities: BOEM, the Bureau of Safety and Environmental Enforcement, and the Office of Natural Resources Revenue. BOEM’s core statutory authority was the Outer Continental Shelf Lands Act of 1953 (OCSLA), which establishes the federal framework for managing and leasing offshore mineral and energy resources on the U.S. Outer Continental Shelf.

In addition to the OCS Lands Act, the Submerged Lands Act (SLA) of 1953 grants individual states rights to the natural resources of submerged lands from the coastline to no more than 3 nautical miles (5.6 km) into the Atlantic, Pacific, the Arctic Oceans, and the Gulf of Mexico. The only exceptions are Texas and the west coast of Florida, where state jurisdiction extends from the coastline to no more than 3 marine leagues (16.2 km) into the Gulf of Mexico.

On July 10, 2026, Secretary of the Interior Doug Burgum issued Secretarial Order 3451, establishing the Marine Minerals Administration (MMA) and reuniting the functions of BOEM and BSEE within a single organization. The reorganization consolidated offshore resource planning, leasing, permitting, inspections, safety enforcement, and environmental oversight while preserving the agencies’ existing statutory authorities and regulations.

== Mission ==
BOEM's stated mission is to "manage development of U.S. Outer Continental Shelf (OCS) energy, mineral, and geological resources in an environmentally and economically responsible way."

=== Hydrocarbons ===
The Outer Continental Shelf (OCS) is a significant source of oil and gas for the nation's energy supply. As of May 1, 2021, BOEM managed about 2,287 active oil and gas leases on approximately 12.1 million OCS acres. As of 2026, the U.S. OCS was responsible for approximately 15% of U.S. oil production, or about 2 million barrels per day.

BOEM is responsible for the development of the National OCS Oil and Gas Leasing Program (National OCS Program), which establishes a five-year schedule of oil and gas lease sales in federal waters. The schedule includes the size, timing, and location of potential oil and gas leasing activity. In general, the process begins with a Request for Information and culminates with the approval of a National OCS Program, with multiple drafts and opportunities to comment in between.

BOEM is responsible for publication of the National Assessment of Undiscovered Oil and Gas Resources, an estimate of the undiscovered, technically and economically recoverable oil and natural gas resources outside of known oil and gas fields on the U.S. Outer Continental Shelf. The National Assessment, published every five years, represents the U.S. government's current understanding of the distribution of undiscovered oil and gas resources on the OCS, and helps identify opportunities for additional oil and gas exploration and development on the OCS. The results are presented as both Undiscovered Technically Recoverable Resources (UTRR) and Undiscovered Economically Recoverable Resources (UERR). The assessment utilizes a geologic play-based approach that incorporates a complete analysis of geologic and petroleum system elements for the UTRR, and an assessment of engineering and economic considerations for the calculation of the UERR. DOI has released an Assessment of Undiscovered Oil and Gas Resources on the U.S. OCS regularly since 1975.

BOEM's 2026 assessment estimated a mean Undiscovered Technically Recoverable Resource of 65.80 billion barrels of oil and 218.43 trillion cubic feet of natural gas in the Outer Continental Shelf.

=== Renewable energy ===
In 2009, the Department of the Interior announced the final regulations for the Outer Continental Shelf (OCS) Renewable Energy Program, which was authorized by the Energy Policy Act of 2005 (EPAct). These regulations provide a framework for issuing leases, easements and rights-of-way for OCS activities that support production and transmission of energy from sources other than oil and natural gas.

In 2024, BOEM and the Bureau of Safety and Environmental Enforcement (BSEE) finalized the Renewable Energy Modernization Rule, the first major update to the federal offshore renewable energy regulations since 2009. The rule revised DOI’s OCS renewable energy framework under 30 C.F.R. Parts 585 and 586 to better reflect a mature offshore wind program, streamline project review and administration, clarify compliance obligations, and reduce costs. Key changes included reforms to offshore wind auction rules, a public renewable energy leasing schedule, more flexible survey and met-buoy requirements, updated project design and installation verification procedures, tailored financial assurance requirements, and clarified safety management system obligations. The final rule was published at 89 Fed. Reg. 42602 on May 15, 2024, and became effective July 15, 2024.

=== Marine minerals ===
BOEM is the only federal agency with the authority to lease marine minerals from the OCS, including responding to commercial requests for OCS minerals such as gold, manganese, or other hard minerals. BOEM's Marine Minerals Program (MMP) also issues leases for sand, gravel, and/or shell resources from federal waters, with efforts focused on shore protection, beach nourishment, and wetland restoration, while prioritizing environmental oversight.

=== Carbon sequestration ===
Carbon sequestration (CS) refers to a process of storing captured carbon dioxide (CO_{2}) that leads to a reduction of CO_{2} in the atmosphere. Carbon sequestration activities can take many forms. One form of long-term storage is injection of captured CO_{2} into suitable underground geologic formations.

On November 15, 2021, the Infrastructure Investment and Jobs Act was signed into law and gave the Department of the Interior the authority to grant a lease, easement, or right-of-way on the Outer Continental Shelf (OCS) for long-term sequestration of carbon dioxide that would otherwise go into the atmosphere and contribute to further climate change. BOEM is working with the Bureau of Safety and Environmental Enforcement (BSEE) on a draft rule to implement this authority over the OCS CS projects.

=== Environmental studies ===
BOEM's environmental program ensures that environmental protection is a foremost and indispensable consideration in BOEM's decision-making.

BOEM uses science and law to inform its environmental analyses, conduct consultations, and design and conduct research. The environmental program informs three major areas that BOEM regulates on the outer continental shelf: oil and gas, renewable energy, and non-energy minerals such as sand and gravel or hard minerals.

== Directors ==
The agency's first director, serving from June 2010 to May 2014, was Tommy Beaudreau. The second director was Abigail Ross Hopper, serving from January 2015 to January 2017. From 2017 to 2021, deputy director Walter Cruickshank served as the acting director.

From February 2021 to January 2023, the director was Amanda Lefton. In an announcement with United States Secretary of Energy Jennifer Granholm on April 27, 2022, Lefton said that her agency would focus on efforts to promote offshore wind projects, saying that BOEM would work to "inspire confidence and demonstrate commitment" for lease planning and calling it her "number-one priority," National Fisherman reported. In January 2023, Lefton announced her resignation, effective January 19.

No.	Picture	Director	Start date	End date	Refs.	President(s) served under
1		Tommy Beaudreau	June 2010	May 2014		Barack Obama
acting		Walter Cruickshank	May 2014	January 6, 2015		Barack Obama
2		Abigail Ross Hopper	January 6, 2015	January 6, 2017		Barack Obama
acting		Walter Cruickshank	January 6, 2017	February 2, 2021		Barack Obama; Donald Trump; Joe Biden
3		Amanda Lefton	February 2, 2021	January 19, 2023		Joe Biden
4		Elizabeth Klein	January 19, 2023	January 20, 2025		Joe Biden
acting		Walter Cruickshank	January 20, 2025	June 10, 2025		Donald Trump
acting		Matthew Giacona	June 10, 2025	September 9, 2026		Donald Trump
acting		Mike Olsen	September 9, 2026	Present		Donald Trump

== Shipwrecks ==
BOEM keeps records of shipwrecks, to ensure the Nation's important historical sites are protected when offshore activities take place on the OCS. These shipwrecks, particularly when over fifty years old, may be eligible for listing on the National Register of Historic Places, and any new wells or pipelines have to be studied for their potential effect on archaeological sites on the outer continental shelf.

=== List of shipwrecks ===
The BOEM maintains a list of shipwrecks and the location.

- Northern Eagle (built 1857), a fishing schooner lost 1908-03-01
- Carrie Strong (lost 1916)
- W.H. Marston (lost 1927)
- Western Empire was abandoned during a hurricane on September 18, 1875. Further research ruled out the wreck as the Western Empire, and it is now believed to be a naval ship (now referred to as the BOEMRE Vessel ID No. 359) that may have been used as a merchant vessel.
- Nokomis (lost 1905)

==== World War II shipwrecks ====
There were over 100 attacks on ships in the Gulf of Mexico by German U-boats. Several were listed by the MMS and maintained by the BOEM.

- SS Gulfoil (built 1912, lost 1942-05-17), sunk by German submarine U-506
- SS Gulfpenn (built 1921, lost 1942-05-13), sunk by German submarine U-506
- SS Robert E. Lee (built 1924, lost 1942-07-30), sunk by German submarine U-166
- SS Alcoa Puritan (built 1941, lost 1942-06-05), sunk by German submarine U-507
- SS Carrabulle (built 1920, lost 1942-05-26), sunk by German submarine U-106.
- SS Amapala (built 1924, lost 1942-05-16), sunk by German submarine U-507

The only known German U-boat to be sunk in the Gulf is U-166. After sinking the SS Robert E. Lee, the United States Navy patrol craft PC-566 reported hitting and sinking the submarine. This was questioned, and the sinking was attributed to a United States Coast Guard Grumman G-44 Widgeon that reported an attack over 100 miles away, thought to be the U-166. In 2001 the wreckage of U-166 was identified near the wreckage of the Robert E. Lee, and in 2014 the record was set straight that PC-566 had actually sunk U-166. In 2014 the position, 28°37′N 90°45′W, was designated a war grave.

== See also ==
- Title 30 of the Code of Federal Regulations
- Worst Case Discharge
- Wind power in the United States
- Second Happy Time
