= Central Vermont Railroad Pier =

Historic place in Connecticut

- U.S. National Register of Historic Places
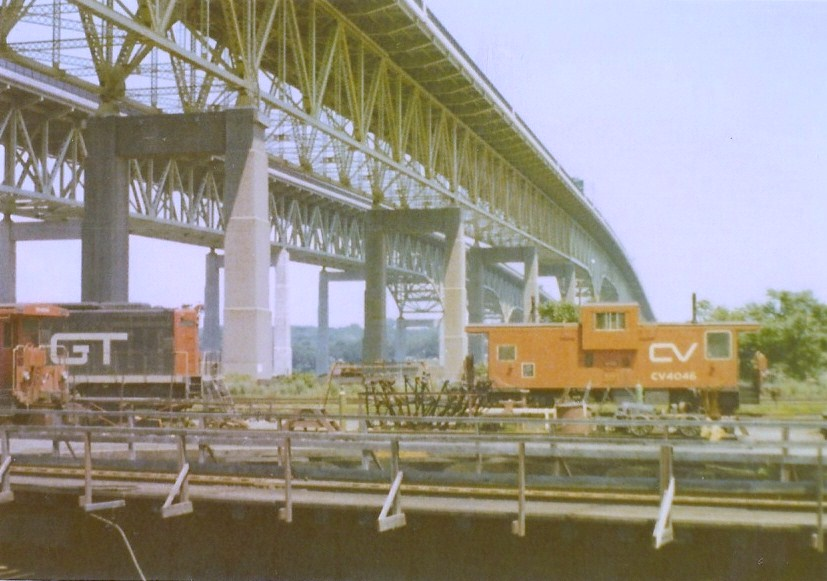
- Central Vermont equipment on the north end of the pier in 1978

- Location within Connecticut Location within the United States
- Location: State Pier Road, New London, Connecticut
- Coordinates: 41°21′35″N 72°5′31″W
- Area: 8.4 acres (3.4 ha)
- Built: 1876
- Architectural style: Earth-filled masonry pier
- NRHP reference No.: 04001551
- Added to NRHP: January 26, 2005

The Central Vermont Railroad Pier is a historic pier on State Pier Road in New London, Connecticut, built in 1876. It originally served as an interchange point between ocean-going freighters and the rail network of the Central Vermont Railroad. It is the only 19th-century pier in Connecticut. It was listed on the National Register of Historic Places in 2005.

== Description and history ==
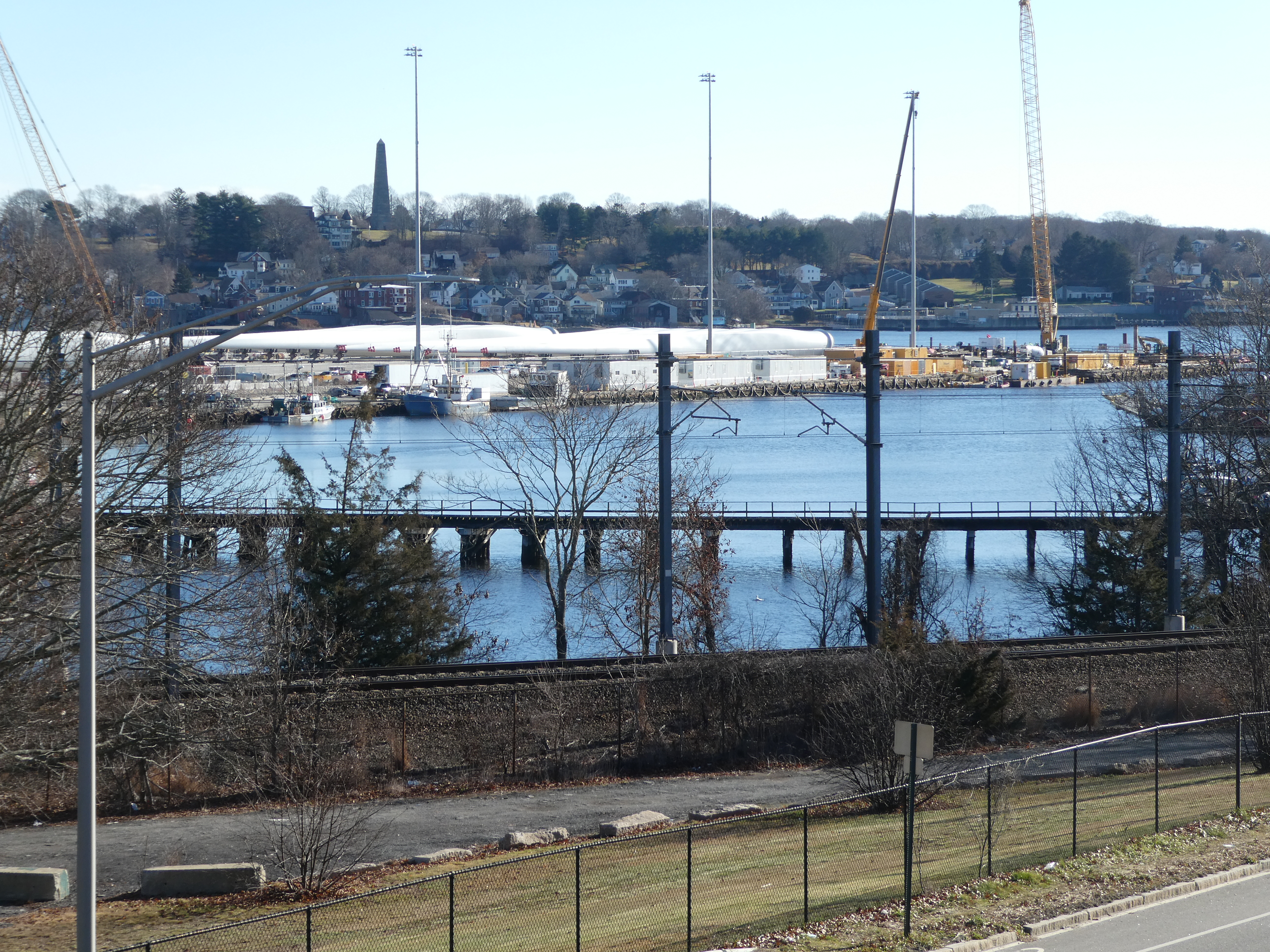
Wind turbine components on the pier in 2023

The Central Vermont Railroad Pier is located north of downtown New London, extending southward from Winthrop Point and into the Thames River. It is a granite-lined earth-filled structure, 1,100 feet (340 m) long, just west of the Connecticut State Pier. It is shaped like a hammer head, 150 feet (46 m) wide for much of its length, but an extended section at its end is 220 feet (67 m) wide.

The pier was built in 1876 by the Central Vermont Railroad, which served central Massachusetts, Vermont, and parts of Canada. It is a rare surviving example of a 19th-century intermodal freight facility, and is believed to be the only remaining 19th-century pier in the state. The facility was initially used by the railroad for the transshipment of coal, with use gradually expanded to include other types of freight. Rail lines were run down the center of the pier, with goods offloaded from freighters directly onto trains. Facilities that once stood on the pier included coal loading equipment and storage bunkers; these and other facilities were removed in the decades after the railroad stopped using it in 1946.

The Central Vermont Railroad Pier and the adjacent State Pier were converted to an offshore wind port under the auspices of the Connecticut Port Authority in 2021–23, used for marshalling and assembly of South Fork Wind, Revolution Wind, and Sunrise Wind projects. The space between the piers was filled to merge them into a single "Central Pier".

== See also ==
- National Register of Historic Places listings in New London County, Connecticut
