= Sunrise Wind =

Offshore wind project

Sunrise Wind Farm
- Country: United States
- Location: WEA OCS-A 0487; Outer Continental Shelf; Offshore MA,RI, NY
- Coordinates: 41.008196°N 71.6539°W
- Status: Under Construction
- Construction began: 2024
- Owner: Ørsted US Offshore Wind

Wind farm
- Type: Offshore
- Distance from shore: 16 miles (26 km)
- Rotor diameter: 660 feet (200 m)
- Site area: 109,952 acres (171.800 sq mi)

Power generation
- Make and model: SGRE 11-200 DD
- Nameplate capacity: 924 MW

External links
- Website: Ørsted US Offshore Wind

Sunrise Wind is a 924 MW utility-scale offshore wind farm under construction on the Outer Continental Shelf offshore which will provide power to the state of New York. It is located 16.4 nautical miles (18.9 miles, 30.4 kilometers) south of Martha's Vineyard, Massachusetts, 26.5 nautical miles (30.5 miles, 48.1 kilometers) east of Montauk Point, New York, and 14.5 nautical miles (16.7 miles, 26.8 kilometers) from Block Island, Rhode Island. Sunrise Wind will consist of 84 Siemens Gamesa turbines. While initially each turbine was specified with a rotor diameter of 167 meters (548 ft) and a capacity of 8.0 MW, installation upgraded the 84 turbines to the SGRE 11-200 DD with a capacity of 11 MW each and a 200 meter (660 ft) rotor diameter.

Sunrise Wind is expected to become the first offshore wind farm in the US to use a more efficient High Voltage Direct Current transmission system. HVDC technology will reduce the number of cables and electrical connections needed and increase the overall efficiency of the project by reducing the amount of energy lost in transmission.

The developer, Ørsted, projects Sunrise Wind to create at least 800 direct construction jobs. By 2027, Sunrise is expected to produce the amount of power equivalent to the annual consumption of 600,000 New York homes.

Sunrise Wind won its offtake agreement with NYSERDA in March 2024 at a higher price of $146. Ørsted completed its Purchase and sale agreement with NYSERDA in June 2024. Sunrise Wind is a part of New York State’s broader initiative to transition to clean energy and achieve net zero emissions by 2040, as outlined in its Climate Leadership and Community Protection Act. Sunrise Wind is also aligned with New York’s goal of achieving 9 GW of offshore wind energy by 2035. Sunrise Wind's development and planning process spanned 11 years, from securing the lease in 2013 to beginning construction in 2024. The project is expected to operate fully from 2027 until 2052.

On 22 December 2025, the US interior department suspended Sunrise Wind and four other offshore wind leases (Vineyard Wind, Empire Wind, Coastal Virginia Offshore Wind and Revolution Wind (Rhode Island)) over what it said were 'national security concerns'. Ørsted filed a lawsuit against suspending Revolution Wind. On 12 January 2026, US district judge Lamberth has overturned this construction freeze. He said this project is likely to succeed in the ongoing legal dispute.

== Development timeline ==
The Sunrise Wind Project follows a four-phase development timeline: Early Development & Planning (2011–2021), Environmental Review & Permitting (2020–2024), Record of Decision & Approvals (2024), and Construction & Installation (2024–2027).

The project began with BOEM’s leasing process in 2011, progressing through environmental assessments, lease consolidations, and ownerships transfers, ultimately ending in Orsted gaining full ownership of Sunrise Wind. Regulatory milestones include permit applications in 2020, a Draft EIS in 2022, and a Final EIS in 2023, culminating in BOEM’s approval of the Construction and Operations Plan (COP) in June 2024. A point to note is that Sunrise Wind originally contracted with NYSERDA at a strike price of $110.37 in NY's first OSW solicitation in 2018. In order to remain financially viable, the developers bid into NY's fourth OSW solicitation in November 2023 in order to contract a 27% higher OREC contract at a strike price of $146 per MWh for 924MW's.

The U.S. Department of the Interior approved the Record of Decision for the project in March 2024. Construction began shortly thereafter in June 2024. As of early 2025, the developer projects Sunrise to be fully operational by the latter half of 2027.

Early Development & Planning	August 2011: BOEM releases Call for Information & Nominations to assess interest in Call Area; February 2012: BOEM designates WEA; June 2013: Environmental Assessment completed with a FONSI; July 2013: BOEM conducted a competitive auction and awarded Lease OCS-A 0487 (67,250 acres) to Deepwater Wind New England, LLC.; October 2018: Ørsted acquired Deepwater Wind for $510 million, which included the Sunrise Wind Project.; June 2017: BOEM approves the SAP for Lease OCS-A 0500; August 2020: Lease OCS-A 0487 assigned to Sunrise Wind, LLC.; September 2020: Bay State Wind, LLC transferred its interest in a portion of lease OCS-A 0500, designated as OCS-A 0530, to Sunrise Wind, LLC.; March 2021: BOEM consolidated lease OCS-A 0530 into Lease OCS-A 0487, amending it to cover a total area of 109,952 acres.
Environmental Review & Permitting	September 2020: Sunrise submits initial COP to BOEM; December 2022: BOEM releases draft EIS for Sunrise Wind; December 2023: BOEM releases FEIS; May 2024: Sunrise Wind contracted a new 25-year OREC with NYSERDA at strike price of $146 per MWh for 924MW's (27% increase from first contract in NY's first OSW solicitation)
Record of Decision & Approvals	March 2024: The U.S. Department of the Interior and BOEM issue joint ROD; June 2024: BOEM approves final COP for Sunrise Wind
Construction & Installation	June 2024: Construction activities begin, including detailed design, procurement, and contracting. Developers start sourcing materials for turbine foundations and cables.; 2025: Installation of turbines begins. By 2026, Sunrise Wind aims to be operational with a possible continuation of construction until the second half of 2027.

Notes: BOEM= Bureau of Ocean Energy Management. FEIS = Final Environmental Impact Statement. ROD = Record of Decision. COP= Construction and Operations Plan. WEA = Wind Energy Area. FONSI = Finding of No Significant Impact. SAP = Site Assessment Plan

== Lease area ==
=== Location ===
Covering approximately 86,823 acres, the Sunrise Wind Lease Area OCS-A 0487 is located in federal waters. At its closest points to shore, the lease area is located 30.4 km south of Martha’s Vineyard, Massachusetts, 48.1 km east of Montauk, New York, and 26.8 km from Block Island, Rhode Island. This location positions Sunrise Wind to harness robust offshore wind resources while minimizing visual impact from shore. The lease area overlaps with commercial fishing waters, although only a portion of the land will be used for the wind turbines and associated infrastructure, leaving much of the area still available for other uses. The offshore export cables would be buried below the seabed in New York state and federal waters, running 104.6 miles. The Holbrook and West-Bus substation in the town of Brookhaven, New York within the Long Island Power Authority's service territory is the planned point of interconnection.

=== History of the lease area ===
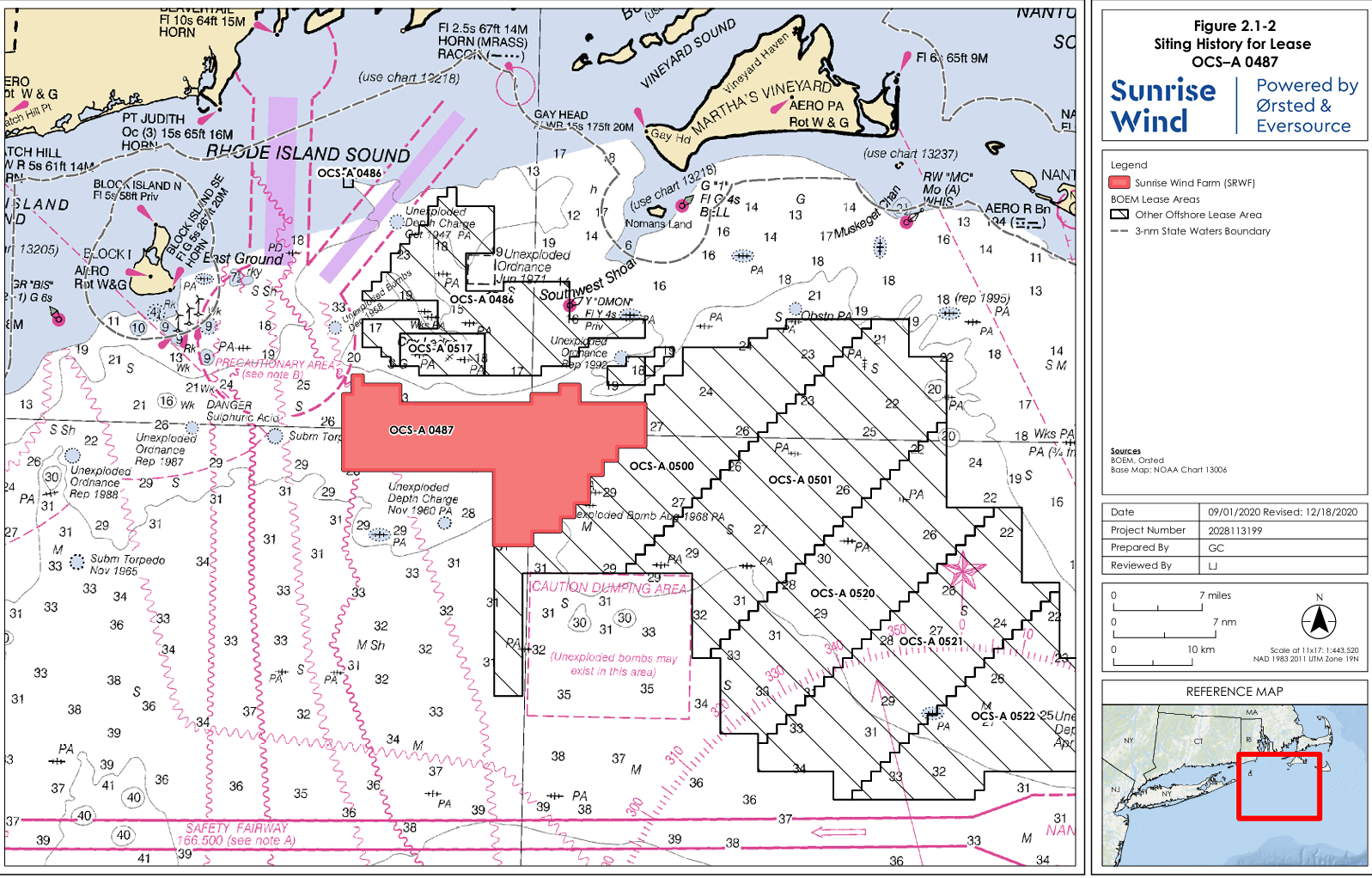
Lease Area Outline for Sunrise Wind Farm.

In 2010 the Department of Interior initiated the preliminary leasing assessment of the area between Rhode Island, New York, and Massachusetts for offshore wind development. In December 2010, a Request for Interest was published by BOEM in the Federal Register, and in 2011, a Call for Information and a Notice of Intent was published. These documents started the environmental assessments for the region between Massachusetts and Rhode Island. In 2012, BOEM called for public comment in the Federal Register for the sale. Sunrise Wind was awarded the preliminary lease in 2015. Momentum with the project was stalled until NYSERDA’s fourth offshore wind solicitation in 2023, which ultimately resulted in Sunrise’s selection. The Outer Continental Shelf Lands Act (OCS) mandates that the Bureau of Ocean Energy Management (BOEM) must award leases for renewable energy projects through competitive bidding, unless BOEM determines there is no competitive interest.

On July 31, 2013, BOEM concluded its lease auction and awarded Lease OCS-A 0487 (consisting of about 67,250 acres) to Deepwater Wind New England, LLC. Deepwater Wind New England, LLC then assigned Lease OCS-A 0487 to Sunrise Wind, LLC on August 3, 2020. On September 3, 2020, Bay State Wind, LLC assigned 100% of its record title interest in a portion of lease OCS-A 0500 to Sunrise Wind, LLC, which BOEM designated OCS-A 0530. Through an amendment to Lease OCS-A 0487 on March 15, 2021, BOEM consolidated lease OCS-A 0530 into Lease OCS-A 0487. The resulting lease area is 109,952 acres and effective date of lease OCS-A 0487 remains October 1, 2013.

Ørsted, the second largest wind farm company in the world, entered the Sunrise Wind Project timeline in June 2015 when BOEM approved the reassignment of Lease OCS-A 0500 to Ørsted (formerly DONG Energy Massachusetts, LLC). This lease was initially awarded to RES Developments in January 2015 during a competitive lease sale for the wind energy area offshore Massachusetts. Between 2021 and 2023 Sunrise faced regulatory challenges. New York State Energy Research and Development Authority (NYSERDA) held its fourth offshore wind solicitation in January 2024. Sunrise Wind bid-in at a higher price. Sunrise Wind will earn $150.15 per megawatt hour in the 25-year contract, which is significantly higher than the $110.37 MW/h price from 2019. Initially, Eversource and Ørsted were co-owners of the project until January 2024, when Ørsted acquired Eversource’s share (50%) for $152 million, becoming the full owner of Sunrise Wind, LLC.

== Regulatory and permitting process ==
The Sunrise Wind project underwent a comprehensive regulatory approval process. BOEM approved the Site Assessment Plan (SAP) for Lease OCS-A 0500 (Bay State Wind) on June 29, 2017. On September 1, 2020, Sunrise Wind, LLC submitted its COP to BOEM, detailing plans for construction, operation, and decommissioning of the wind farm. BOEM conducted a thorough environmental review under the National Environmental Policy Act (NEPA), assessing potential impacts on marine ecosystems, navigation, and other ocean users. On March 26, 2024, BOEM issued the ROD, concluding the environmental review and granting approval for the project to proceed. Following the ROD, BOEM approved the COP on June 21, 2024, finalizing the federal permits necessary for construction and operation. Developers obtained authorization from NOAA Fisheries for the incidental take of marine mammals during construction, ensuring compliance with the Marine Mammal Protection Act.

=== Site assessment plan ===
In 2014, site assessment began for Sunrise. Bay State Wind requested a one-year extension for submitting the site assessment plan, which BOEM approved. In December 2016, the SAP was filed and further revisions were submitted in March and April 2017. On May 1, 2017, the Site Assessment Plan (SAP) for Lease OCS-A 0500 (Bay State Wind) was completed, and later approved by BOEM on June 29, 2017, allowing Sunrise to install two floating light and detection ranging buoys (FLIDARs) and one metocean/current buoy.

=== Environmental impact statement ===
On August 31, 2021, BOEM published a Notice of Intent (NOI) to Prepare an Environmental Impact Statement (EIS) for the Sunrise Wind project. The NOI was then corrected on September 3, 2021, to make technical corrections and extend the comment period to October 4, 2021. The NOI initiated a 30-day public comment period during which BOEM hosted three virtual scoping meetings where the public could learn more about the Construction and Operations Plan (COP), ask questions, and provide oral testimony. During the scoping period, BOEM received 88 submissions from the public, Tribes, agencies, and other stakeholders.

On December 12, 2022, BOEM announced the availability of the Draft Environmental Impact Statement (DEIS) for the proposed Sunrise Wind project. The Notice of Availability for the Sunrise Wind DEIS was published in the Federal Register on December 16, 2022, and opened a 60-day public comment period ending on February 14, 2023. The input received via this process informed the preparation of the Final Environmental Impact Statement (FEIS).

During the comment period, BOEM again held three virtual public meetings, where the public could learn more about the review process, EIS schedule, potential impacts from the proposed project, and proposals to reduce potential impacts. There was also an opportunity for participants to provide comments on the Draft EIS. On March 20, 2024, BOEM published an errata on its website that included a correction to the cumulative impact conclusion level for marine mammals under the No Action Alternative in Chapter 3. The errata also correct the impact conclusion level for benthic resources under the No Action Alternative in the Chapter 2 summary table, several anticipated enforcing agencies identified in Appendix H, and minor typographic errors. None of these edits or corrections are substantive or affect the analysis or conclusions in the FEIS. On December 11, 2023, BOEM announced the availability of the Final Environmental Impact Statement (FEIS) for the proposed Sunrise Wind project.

The FEIS assessed the potential biological, socioeconomic, physical, and cultural impacts that could result from the construction, operations and maintenance, and decommissioning of the Sunrise Wind project. Recommendations and alternative options were detailed on how to best monitor and reduce the impact on the surrounding area.

- Alternative A, or "No Action," would see BOEM not approving the Construction and Operations Plan, and the project would not move forward with construction. The No Action Alternative is the baseline Alternative that all actions are weighed against.
- Alternative B, the "Proposed Action" plan proposed 108 WTGs with a maximum capacity of 1056 MW. The Proposed Alternative was found to have a moderate adverse impact on benthic habitat.
- Alternative C-1, the "Reduced Layout from Priority Areas via Exclusion of up to Eight WTG Positions" plan was found to be unfeasible after additional geotechnical research following the publication of the Draft Environmental Impact Statement. Specifically, glauconite sands were found at potential turbine locations which left only 72 of the proposed positions available for installation, resulting in only 792 MW of capacity, which did not meet the OREC agreement.
- Alternative C-2, the "Reduced Layout from Priority Areas via Exclusion of up to Eight WTG Positions and Relocation of up to 12 WTG Positions to the eastern side of the Lease Area" plan was found to be unfeasible after additional geotechnical research following the publication of the Draft Environmental Impact Statement. Specifically, glauconite sands were found at potential turbine locations which left only 63 of the proposed positions available for installation, resulting in only 693 MW of capacity, which did not meet the OREC agreement.
- Alternative C-3, the "Reduced Layout from Priority Areas Considering Feasibility due to Glauconite Sands" plan included three potential WTG configurations to reduce the impact on sensitive benthic habitat. Sub-Alternative C-3a would install 87 WTGs at 87 potential positions, Sub-Alternative C-3b would install 84 WTGs at 87 potential positions, and Sub-Alternative C-3c would install 80 WTGs would be installed at 87 potential positions. All Sub-Alternatives prioritized moving turbines from complex seafloor areas to homogenous, soft-bottom areas to reduce impacts on benthic habitat.

A Preferred Alternative considered the results of BOEM’s economic feasibility analysis and the perspectives of local governments, tribes, and other stakeholders. BOEM identified Sub-Alternative C-3b (84 WTGs with 924 MW capacity) as the Preferred Alternative.

These alternatives were evaluated as to which would minimize environmental harm. Alternatives C-1 and C-2 were deemed no longer viable due to glauconite feasibility issues, which left Sub-Alternatives C-3a, C-3b, and C-3c. After analysis and feedback, BOEM identified Sub-Alternative C-3b (the 924 MW option) as the Preferred Alternative. This alternative minimizes environmental impacts while meeting energy generation goals. It includes strategies such as micro-siting (the process of evaluating the site for the most efficient placement of turbines) to avoid complex habitats, boulders, unexploded ordnances, and shipwrecks, while ensuring compliance with project feasibility.

=== Record of Decision and approvals ===
On March 26, 2024, the Department of the Interior announced the approval of the Sunrise Wind offshore wind project. The Record of Decision (ROD) documents the decision to approve the construction of up to 84 wind turbines within the lease area. The Record of Decision finalizes the reporting requirements, safety system, and reporting plan that will be legally adopted by Sunrise Wind and other stakeholders and outlines the reasons why Alternative 3-CB was chosen as Sunrise Wind’s development plan.

On June 21, 2024, BOEM announced its approval of the Construction and Operations Plan (COP) for the Sunrise Wind Project, officially granting the project easement Sunrise Wind requested on September 1, 2023. The Sunrise Wind COP calls for 94 wind turbine generators at 102 locations, inter-array cables, and both an offshore and onshore converter station. It also authorizes an onshore interconnection cable to the Long Island Power Authority Holbrook Substation, and an offshore transmission cable making landfall on Long Island, New York.

== Finance ==
=== Offtake agreement ===
In New York's first offshore wind solicitation in 2018, Sunrise Wind contracted with NYSERDA at a strike price of $110.37 per MWh for 880MWs. In 2023, Orsted and Eversource threatened to cancel the project without higher prices. The developers (Orsted and Eversource) cited inflation, supply chain challenges, the pandemic, and Russia’s invasion in Ukraine for causing increased project payments. Under the New York state rule that allow bids from wind projects that need new contractual terms to remain financially viable, Sunrise Wind was able to bid into New York's fourth offshore wind solicitation in November 2023. On May 31, 2024, Sunrise Wind contracted a new 25-year OREC with NYSERDA at strike price of $146 per MWh for 924MW's.This strike price was a 27% increase from the previous rate.

Each Offshore Renewable Energy Certificate (OREC) represents proof that 1 MWh of electricity was generated and fed into the New York grid. By locking in a rate of $146 per MWh, Sunrise Wind is provided with a stable revenue stream that makes it easier to secure financing and mitigate market risks associated with fluctuations in the average cost of electricity in New York.

In addition to the 924 MW contracted to NYSERDA, Sunrise Wind has the opportunity to enter into other potential offtake agreements or sell additional electricity on a merchant basis, which means selling directly into electricity markets without a long-term contract. If Sunrise Wind were to go forward with this option, the additional capacity (up to 110 MW) would be installed during a single campaign with the 924 MW contracted to NYSERDA.

=== Cost and finance structure ===
Orsted and Eversource entered into the project as a joint venture and announced their final investment decision (FID) on Sunrise Wind on March 6, 2024. In January 2024, however, Orsted signed an agreement with Eversource to acquire the company's 50% share should Sunrise Wind get awarded adequate OREC agreements, COP's, and relevant regulatory approvals. The two companies originally agreed on a purchase price of $230 million. However, due to "lower actual versus forecast capex spend" between signing and closing, the purchase price was $152 million. This transaction, taking place in July 2024, gave Orsted full ownership of Sunrise Wind. In its fourth quarter of 2024, Orsted reported impairment losses of $1.73 billion, primarily citing the rising costs of Sunrise Wind construction (specifically its monopile foundations).

These construction and supply chain issues resulted in the expected commissioning of the project to be delayed into the second half of 2027. The annual rent for Lease OCS-A 0487 has been set at $329,856.00. These payments are calculated based on the area of the lease (per acre or fraction), and they are meant to serve as an incentive for timely construction and compensate the public for granting rights to develop the leased area. In addition, Sunrise Wind maintains an Irrevocable Standby Letter of Credit Number SBY59568 in the amount of $433,000, which serves as a financial guarantee for the project. This type of instrument is often used in project finance to provide security to various stakeholders.

Sunrise Wind also qualifies for federal tax credits. Under the 2022 Inflation Reduction Act (IRA), offshore wind projects are eligible for a 30% Investment Tax Credit of the capital costs of the project. Ørsted was granted over $90 million in tax breaks from the town of Brookhaven, New York. The construction of the electrical converter station, and an 18-mile-long cable connecting the wind farm to a Holbrook substation will be supported by $87.4 million in tax breaks over 25 years. An additional $2.6 million in tax breaks over 10 years will convert an East Setauket building into an operations center. These tax breaks were granted by the officials from the Brookhaven Industrial Development Agency.

== Infrastructure development ==
While Sunrise originally predicted to be commissioned and operational by the end of Q4 2025, commissioning has now been pushed back to the second half of 2027. Sunrise Wind will be first offshore wind project in U.S. to use HVDC Transmission Technology. HVDC technology will reduce the number of cables and electrical connections needed compared to Alternating Current (AC) systems. Because of its utility-scale 924-megawatt capacity and distance to the grid, Sunrise Wind is well-suited to deploy this technology and take advantage of its ability to reduce the amount of energy lost in transmission.

Construction begins with onshore facilities, including site preparation, trench excavation, cable installation, cable jointing, and final testing and restoration. Next is the SRWEC (offshore export cable) installation, which involves pre-lay cable surveys, seafloor preparation, offshore cable installation, cable installation surveys, cable protection, and connection to the OCS–DC. Following the export cable, the offshore foundations are installed. After the foundations, the inter-array cables (IAC) are installed to connect the wind turbine generators to each other. The WTG (wind turbine generators) are then installed. Finally, the OCS-DC (offshore converter station) is installed.

=== Construction timeline ===
Duration	Activity
2023 Q2 - 2023 Q4	Onshore Facilities (OnCS–DC and Onshore Transmission Cable)
2023 Q4 - 2024 Q1	Subsea Renewable Water Energy Converter
2024 Q1 - 2025 Q1	Offshore Foundations
2024 Q3 - 2025 Q3	Wind Turbine Generators (WTGs)
2025 Q1 - 2025 Q4	Offshore Converter Station – Direct Current
2025 Q2 - 2025 Q4	Commissioning Phase - Testing of Project Components
2027	Project is expected to be operational

=== Offshore Wind Farm ===
In 2022, Sunrise Wind selected Siemens Gamesa to supply their wind turbines. The project will install 94 Siemens Gamesa Renewable Energy SG DD-167 turbine models, each with the capacity of 8.0 MW at 102 potential locations, a reduction from the initial 122 positions. Each turbine will have a maximum height of 240 meters (790 ft), a rotor diameter of 167 meters (548 ft), a hub height of 140 meters (460 ft), and an air gap above the water of 40 meters (130 ft). The air gap is the distance between the lowest part of the turbine and the average sea level. The Siemens Gamesa 8.0-167 turbines have a swept area of 21,900 square meters, which is an increase from previous models.

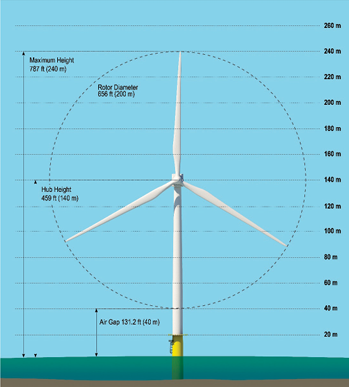
Turbine Overview or Sunrise Wind

The WTGs will be installed in a uniform east–west/north–south grid with a spacing of 1.15 miles by 1.15 miles (1 by 1 nautical mile; 1.85 by 1.85 kilometers). The foundations for these WTGs will predominantly be monopile foundations, which require tubular steel piles to be driven into the seabed to a target depth of embedment. Installation of a single monopile foundation is estimated to require one to four hours of pile driving and up to three monopile foundations will be installed in a 24-hour period using one installation vessel. At a maximum, the project expects up to two vessels working simultaneously. This could be two monopile vessels, or one monopile foundation vessel and one piled jacket foundation vessel.

=== Grid interconnection ===
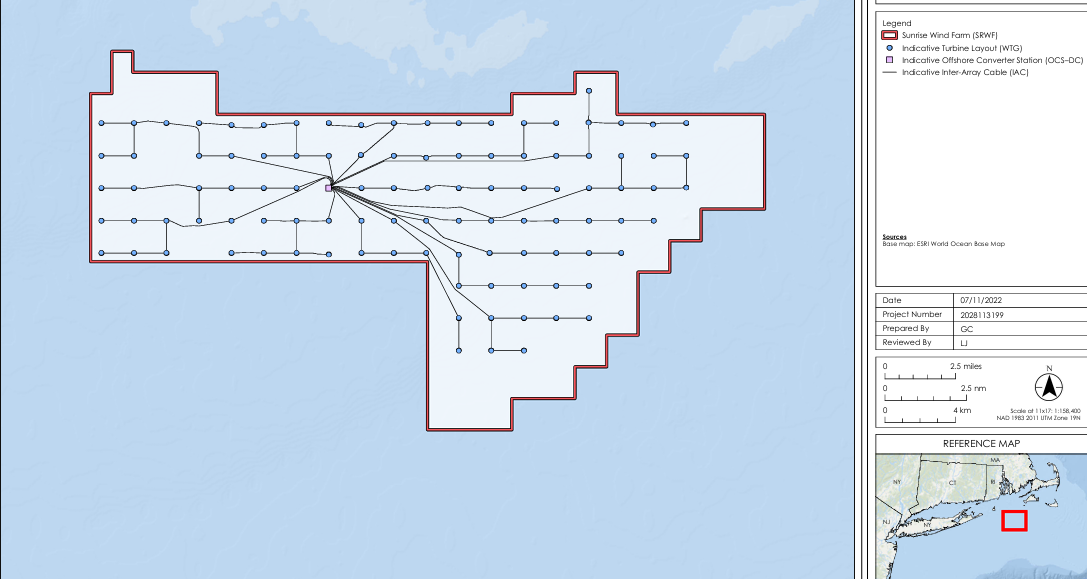
Map of WTG's for Sunrise Wind

==== Onshore facilities ====
Onshore facilities will be constructed prior to offshore infrastructure. The onshore facilities include:

- Onshore Transmission Cable and concrete and/or direct buried joint bays and associated components.
- Transition Joint Bay (TJB).
- Onshore Interconnection Cable.
- Fiber optic cable co-located with the Onshore Transmission and Onshore Interconnection Cables.
- One Onshore Converter Station (OnCS–DC).

The onshore interconnection cables will be designed for approximately 230–275 kV HVAC or 320–525 kV HVDC, installed in an underground duct bank. Techniques such as directional boring will be employed to minimize impacts on roadways, wetlands, and waterbodies.

==== Point of interconnection (POI) ====
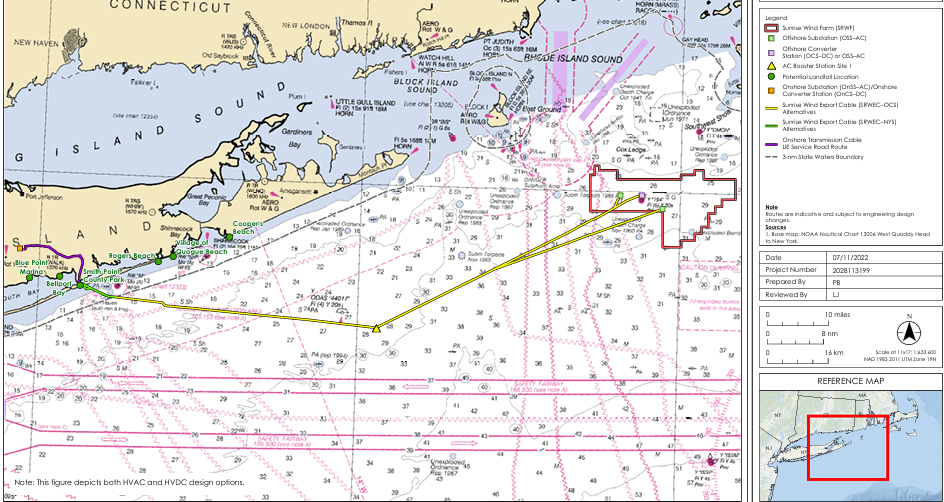
Map of Interconnections for Sunrise Wind

The Sunrise Wind Project will establish a comprehensive offshore and onshore infrastructure for renewable energy transmission. Once the offshore cable reaches the beach, it will run underground along roadways to an onshore converter station on Union Avenue in Holbrook, New York. From there, an underground cable will connect to the Holbrook PSEG Long Island Substation, facilitating integration into the existing electrical grid. The project will utilize directional boring to install the cable while preserving beach access and minimizing surface disturbance. The nearest wind turbines will be located at least 30 miles offshore, making them largely invisible. The design of the transmission facilities avoids overhead utility poles to reduce disruption risks, and the project has a potential total capacity of up to 1,034 MW, including 924 MW contracted to NYSERDA. Construction for the converter station and related facilities began in Q3 2023, with commissioning expected by Q4 2025. Sunrise Wind will use 84 turbines connected to a grid of inter-array cables and an offshore converter station. Sunrise connects to the grid through a single 100 miles (160 km) underwater export cable to Fire Island, New York.

==== Offshore facilities ====
Offshore facilities, including the installation of up to 94 Wind Turbine Generators (WTGs) at 102 potential positions, will follow. The offshore export cables will utilize 230–275 kV HVAC cables and/or 320–525 kV HVDC cables, while the inter-array cables will range from 66 to 150 kV HVAC. The total length of inter-array cables is expected to be up to 180 miles (290 km). The project will also include one Offshore Converter Station (OCS–DC) and one DC submarine export cable bundle (SRWEC) consisting of two cables located within an up to 104.6-mile (168.4-km) long corridor. Piled jackets will be used to install the Offshore Converter stations.

== Benefits and concerns ==
=== Socio-economic ===
In 2022, Sunrise partnered with a local community college and established the National Offshore Wind Training Center in Suffolk County. The National Offshore Wind Training Center is a collaboration between the Long Island Federation of Labor, the Nassau & Suffolk Building and Construction, International Brotherhood of Electrical Workers, Utility Workers Union of America, and Suffolk County Community College. Sunrise pledged $1 million to the Multi-Craft Apprenticeship Preparation Program (M.A.P.P.), which trains lower income workers in offshore wind apprenticeships. Sunrise pledged $5 million to Stony Brook University for offshore wind research and innovation. To compensate for potential losses to commercial and for-hire recreational fishers as a direct result of the project, Sunrise Wind, LLC committed to establishing fishery mitigation funds. Sunrise committed $16.5 million for wildlife and fisheries monitoring.

Public comments submitted for the Sunrise Wind project included submissions by the Passamaquoddy Tribe, the Rhode Island Coastal Resources Management Council, and the Responsible Offshore Development Alliance (RODA). Sunrise Wind signed its Community Benefits Agreement with the town of Brookhaven, New York on March 20, 2023. The $169.9 million Community Benefits Agreement targets various organizations in Suffolk County, New York including school districts. Key provisions include 25 annual impact fees ranging from $5 to $6 million, starting once the project begins generating power. Additionally, there is a $5 million payment allocated for the construction of a Tri-Hamlet park, $2 million allocated to public health services, and $28 million in Payment in Lieu of Taxes payments. An agreement between Sunrise Wind and the Brookhaven Industrial Agency also ensures $90 million in tax incentives for the construction of the cable landing and operations center.

The development of Sunrise Wind includes making investments in the state’s offshore wind workforce and supply chain. Long Island-based Haugland Energy Group LLC (an affiliate of Haugland Group LLC) has been awarded a $200 million contract to install its underground duct bank system for transmission links, thus creating more than 400 jobs for New York union workers. Additionally, Riggs Distler & Co. has received an $86 million contract for the steel manufacturing of turbine foundation components at the Port of Coeymans, thus supporting 230 family-sustaining jobs. Sunrise will also invest $10 million in the development of New York’s National Offshore Wind Training Center on Long Island and $5 million in a research partnership with Stony Brook University.

The developer, Ørsted, projects Sunrise Wind to create 800 direct construction jobs and thousands more indirect and induced jobs through investments in the local economy. According to Ørsted, Sunrise Wind is set to generate over $6 billion in economic benefits over its 25-year lifespan. Sunrise's contract with NYSERDA requires the developer to purchase at least $188 million of U.S.-made iron and steel in an effort to support local manufacturing.

The Final Environmental Impact Statement notes that nighttime aviation warning lighting on WTGs might have a localized economic impact on tourism. With the caveat that the WTGs would not "dominate" views, the Final Environmental Impact Statement notes the possibility that the visibility of the structures might impact property owners and the tourism industry.

=== Climate and environment ===
Sunrise's contract with NYSERDA requires the developer to dedicate $16.5 million to wildlife and fisheries monitoring. Sunrise has implemented various programs to reduce the adverse impact on the North Atlantic Right Whale. Specifically, no construction activities will occur from January 1 through April 30 as this is the North Atlantic Right Whale's primary occupation season in the area. Bubble Curtains, a form of sound attenuation, will also be used to reduce the impact of noise from construction.

== Current status and outlook ==
On January 20, 2025, President Trump signed an Executive Order halting all new offshore wind leases and permitting within the United States. In January 2025, Ørsted announced that Sunrise’s completion date would be pushed back to the latter half of 2027. The company cited increased costs for the development of monopile foundations as the reason for the setback.

Upon operation, the project is expected to have a life span of 25 years, which is typical of offshore wind farms, as most become economically unfeasible with emerging technologies, and turbines are subject to wear and tear.

== See also ==
- List of offshore wind farms in the United States
- Wind power in New York
- Wind power in the United States
- Revolution Wind
- Vineyard Wind
