= Connecticut Port Authority =

Airport authority

Agency overview
- Formed: 2014
- Jurisdiction: Coastal Connecticut
- Employees: 6
- Agency executive: Michael O'Connor, Executive Director
- Website: ctportauthority.com

The Connecticut Port Authority provides guidance, resources, and advocacy for the State of Connecticut's deep water ports and small harbors. It was signed into law by Connecticut Governor Dannel Malloy in 2014 to bring together the state's three deep-water ports of New London, New Haven, and Bridgeport under one statewide port authority. The Act helps Connecticut present a unified front to international customers. The quasi-public authority has the power to issue bonds. Oversight for the ports was transferred to the Authority from the Connecticut Department of Transportation. The Connecticut Port Authority aims to grow the maritime economy in Connecticut by making improvements to the infrastructure at the ports and small harbors and strategically investing in high-potential growth areas. One of the ways they do this is through the SHIPP grant program found here: https://ctportauthority.com/shipp/

== History ==
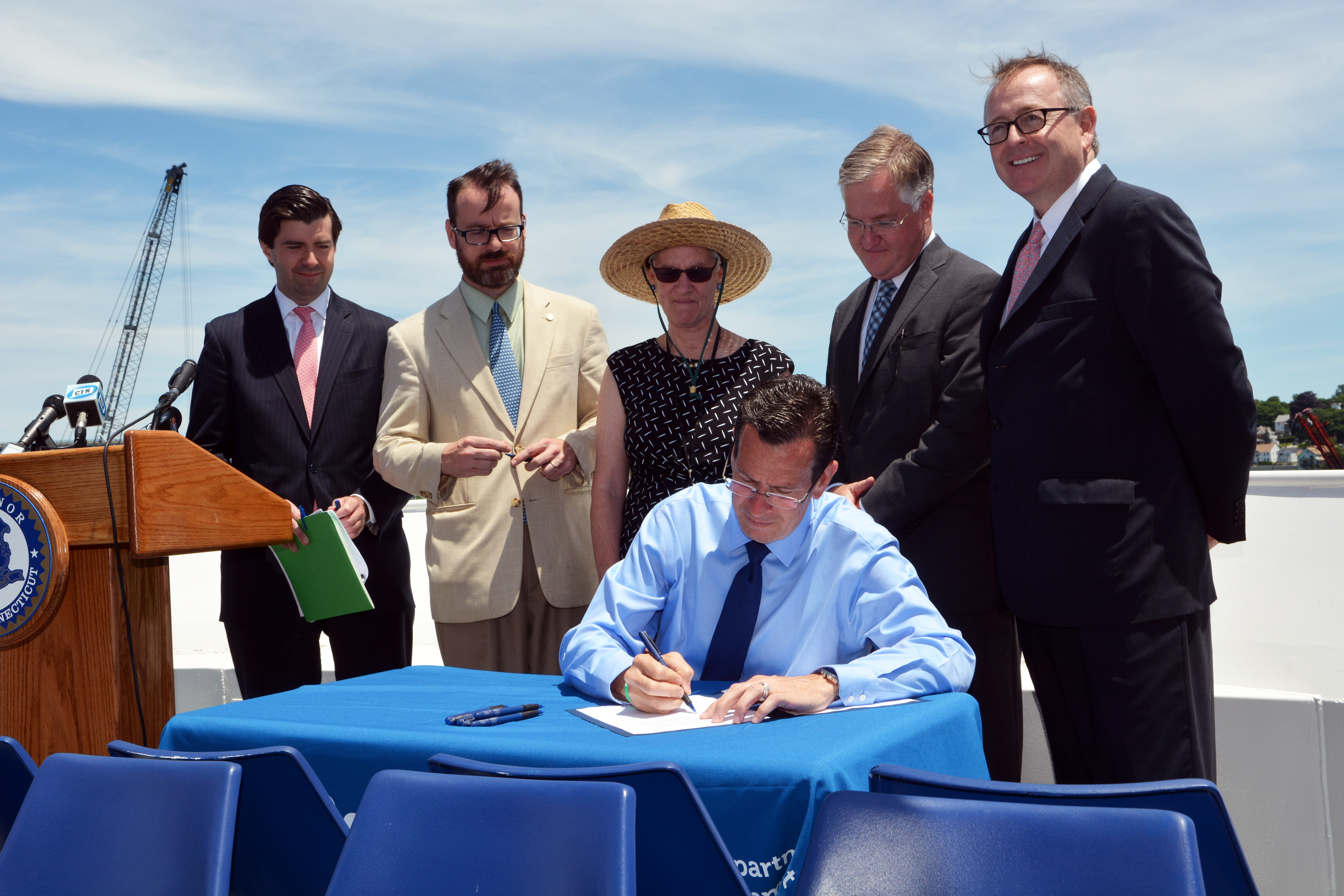
Governor Dannel Malloy signing the Connecticut Port Authority into law

The Connecticut Port Authority was signed into law by Connecticut Governor Dannel Malloy in 2014 to bring together the state's three deep-water ports under one statewide port authority. Facilities include those at State Pier at New London, Bridgeport Harbor, and New Haven Harbor.

In May 2018, then-Governor Malloy proposed $15 million to upgrade the Connecticut State Pier in New London so that it could be used to transport shipping equipment and workers for offshore wind projects in the Northeastern United States. By May 2019, this proposal grew into a $93 million partnership between the Connecticut Port Authority and Bay State Wind, a joint venture between Eversource and Ørsted. The new partnership was formed to expand State Pier's heavy-lift capacity, enabling the companies to assemble wind turbine generators at the port. In June 2019, former Connecticut Port Authority Chairman Scott Bates resigned. The following month, Governor Ned Lamont appointed David Kooris to the position of Chairman. In February 2020, the Connecticut Port Authority approved a new redevelopment plan, after 18 months of negotiation, which was expected to cost $157 million. Work on the redevelopment began in February 2021, with the demolition of a number of on-site buildings. In August 2021, the project won DEEP approval to fill in water between two existing piers, as part of a plan to merge them into one larger pier able to handle larger heavy-lift equipment. At that point, the cost of the project grew to $235 million. In May 2022, David Kooris, the Chairman of the Connecticut Port Authority since 2019, testified that his predecessors knew the initial $93 million cost of the partnership was unrealistic. That month, the state government approved another $20 million for the State Pier project, bringing its cost to over $255 million. In December 2022, the Connecticut State Contracting Standards Board announced it would investigate how the Connecticut Port Authority handled awarding contracts, following news that a construction company was able to recommend itself for over $87 million in subcontracts. By December 2023, the cost of the project had expanded to $309 million, with one-third of the cost set to be borne by Eversource and Ørsted. That month, the Connecticut Port Authority announced it projected to earn a profit of $1.1 million for the Fiscal Year 2024.

In September 2023, Chairman David Kooris announced that state officials were discussing whether to merge the Connecticut Port Authority into the Connecticut Airport Authority, which oversees Bradley International Airport and five other state-owned aviation facilities.

== Controversy ==
The Connecticut Port Authority has faced substantial criticism in regards to its State Pier project in New London, due to numerous cost escalations and delays. In July 2021, Connecticut Governor Ned Lamont has stated that the project's development has been "a little longer and it was more expensive than we wanted", and by May 2022, said he was "mad as hell" about the increasing cost projections.

In July 2021, a Republican official in the Connecticut House of Representatives criticized the project's high costs and "lack of transparency on the part of the Port Authority". An audit in late 2019 found that the Connecticut Port Authority spent thousands of dollars in previous fiscal years on expensive meals and liquor, incurred excessive legal fees and generally acted without clear policies governing purchases, personnel matters and ethics. During this time, it found that the Connecticut Port Authority had an improper relationship with a contractor called Seabury Capital. The Connecticut Port Authority paid Seabury Capital over $1 million, including a $523,000 "success" fee. A Managing Director of Seabury Capital had served on the Board of the Connecticut Port Authority during this time. Said Managing Director agreed to pay an $18,500 fine to the Connecticut Office of State Ethics for this scheme. Later, Seabury Capital was fined $10,000 for improper gifts to Connecticut Port Authority employees, and a board member, including National Hockey League tickets, and overnight stays at a club in the affluent town of Greenwich.

Previous Chairman David Kooris testified in May 2022 that his predecessors knew that a previous cost projection of $93 million was an unrealistic figure. Kooris stated that "there probably should have been more nuance conveyed at that time that it was a preliminary estimate", and that said estimates did not include "soft costs", like architectural and engineering fees, and permitting and legal expenses.
