= South Fork Wind =

Offshore wind farm in the United States

South Fork Wind Farm
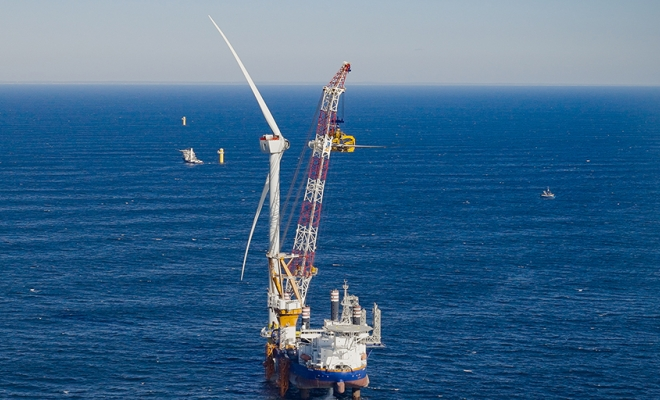
- Country: United States
- Location: WEA OCS-A 0517; Outer Continental Shelf; Offshore Rhode Island
- Coordinates: 41.092°N 71.311161°W
- Status: Operational
- Construction began: 2022
- Commission date: 2024
- Owner: Ørsted US Offshore Wind

Wind farm
- Type: Offshore
- Distance from shore: 16 miles (26 km)
- Rotor diameter: 660 feet (200 m)
- Site area: 13,700 acres (21.4 sq mi)

Power generation
- Units operational: 12 × 11 MW
- Make and model: SG 11-MW
- Nameplate capacity: 130 MW

External links
- Website: Ørsted US Offshore Wind

South Fork Wind Farm is the United States' first utility-scale offshore wind farm. It is located on the Outer Continental Shelf Offshore Rhode Island and providing power to New York state.

The 132 MW, 12-turbine wind farm is located 16.6 nautical miles (30.7 km; 19.1 mi) southeast of Rhode Island's Block Island and 26 nautical miles (48 km; 30 mi) east of Montauk Point on the South Fork of New York's Long Island. The wind farm is expected to generate electricity equivalent to that consumed by 70,000 Long Island homes use in a year and offset 300,000 tons of carbon emissions each year. The turbines are Siemens Gamesa 11.0-200 DD machines, meaning each turbine will have a capacity of 11.0 MW and a diameter of 200 meters. The substation is the first of its kind built in the United States, by Kiewit Offshore Services, Ltd. The wind farm was built by Ørsted US Offshore Wind in conjunction with Eversource and approved by the Long Island Power Authority, a not-for-profit public utility company serving Long Island and Rockaway, Queens. The project is a 97,498 acres (39,456 ha) section of Wind Energy Area (WEA) OCS-A 0486 (North Lease). The wind farm connects to the power grid through an underwater export cable to East Hampton, New York.

Though the lease was approved by Long Island Power Authority in 2017, construction of South Fork Wind did not began until February 2022. Power from the first turbine began being delivered to the grid on December 6, 2023. New York Governor Kathy Hochul and Interior Secretary Deb Haaland announced the completion of the project on March 14, 2024, at an event with international renewable energy leaders.

== Development timeline ==
On September 12, 2013, BOEM awarded two commercial offshore wind energy leases, OCS-A-0486 and OCS-A-0487, to Deepwater Wind New England LLC for development of a regional offshore wind energy project.

Deepwater Wind, the predecessor to Ørsted US Offshore Wind, originally proposed a 90-megawatt, 15-turbine wind farm in a 256 square miles area in 2013. Long Island Power Authority recommended the project for approval in July 2016, which was delayed at the request of the New York State Energy Research and Development Authority. Regulatory approval for a 90 MW wind farm was granted in January 2017. The project was expanded to 132 megawatt capacity in 2018. Thomas Falcone, CEO of Long Island Power Authority, initially hoped to complete the contract in first quarter 2017 with construction beginning in 2019 and power generation starting in 2022. Energy generated at South Fork will power the towns of Southampton and East Hampton on the South Fork of Long Island, the latter of which has vowed to have 100 percent of its energy coming from renewable sources by 2030.

Ørsted US Offshore Wind acquired Deepwater Wind in 2019, and partnered with Eversource Energy to construct South Fork Wind. The project uses twelve Siemens Gamesa 11 MW turbines. Long Island Power Authority will purchase the electricity generated. NYSERDA has approved the project.

Early Development & Planning	2012: BOEM publishes a call for information in the Federal Register to attract proposals from offshore wind companies.; 2013: BOEM revises the Notice of Availability (NOA) for the Rhode Island-Massachusetts Wind Energy Area (RI-MA WEA).; 2017: BOEM approved the Site Assessment Plan (SAP) for Lease OCS-A 0486 to Deepwater Wind New England LLC.; 2017: BOEM grants Lease Area OCS-A 0517, a revised lease comprising 13,700 acres, to Deepwater South Fork LLC.
Environmental Review & Permitting	2021: South Fork Wind requests a pause in permitting under FAST-41, a coordination process for federal agencies undertaking infrastructure projects.; August 2021: BOEM publishes a Notice of Availability (NOA) of a Final Environmental Impact Statement (EIS).; October 2021: In accordance with Section 7 (Interagency Cooperation) of the Endangered Species Act, NMFS issues a Biological Opinion.; November 2021: BOEM and NMFS issue a joint Record of Decision (ROD), approving the EIS.
Record of Decision & Approvals	2017: Long Island Power Authority approves a Power Purchase Agreement (PPA) to buy energy from South Fork Wind.; November 2021: BOEM issues a Record of Decision (ROD).
Construction & Installation	June 2018: South Fork Wind submits its first Construction and Operations Plan (COP).; 2018: Long Island Power Authority announces the expansion of the South Fork contract from 90 MW to 132 MW.; May 2019: South Fork Wind submits its updated Construction and Operations Plan (COP); November 2021: BOEM issues a Record of Decision (ROD) approving South Fork Wind's COP.; February 2022: Construction of South Fork Wind begins with the installment of onshore export cables connecting the project to the Long Island power grid.; June 2023: The first monopile foundation is installed.; December 2023: The first South Fork turbine begins powering the grid, representing the first time commercial offshore wind power has reached the grid in the United States.; March 2024: Construction ends with 12 operational turbines.

== Lease Area ==
=== Location ===
The South Fork project BOEM Renewable Energy Lease Area OCS-A 0517 is located within federal waters on the Outer Continental Shelf (OCS), approximately 19 miles southeast of Block Island, Rhode Island, and 35 miles east of Montauk Point, New York. South Fork Wind's lease area is adjacent to Revolution Wind and nearby the proposed Vineyard Wind lease area.

=== History of the Lease Area ===
The Outer Continental Shelf Lands Act (OCS) mandates that the Bureau of Ocean Energy Management (BOEM) must award leases for renewable energy projects through competitive bidding, unless BOEM determines there is no competitive interest.

In July 2010, the Governors of Rhode Island and Massachusetts identified an Area of Mutual Interest for BOEM to consider for leasing. In August 2011, BOEM published a Call for information and nominations to assess industry interest in wind energy leasing and seek public input. They also published a Notice of Intent (NOI) to prepare an Environmental Assessment (EA) for offshore wind leasing activities. In February 2012, BOEM identified a Wind Energy Area (WEA) offshore Rhode Island and Massachusetts, excluding certain areas based on public comments. In July 2012, BOEM issued a Notice of Availability (NOA) for the EA. In December 2012, they proposed 164,750 acres for wind energy leasing and sought public comment.

After reviewing comments, BOEM published a revised EA in June 2013 and concluded there would be no significant environmental impact from the leasing activities. The final sale notice was also published in June 2013.

On July 31, 2013, BOEM held the first-ever competitive lease sale for the Rhode Island/Massachusetts Wind Energy Area (WEA). The auction was conducted for two lease areas: the North Lease Area (Lease OCS-A0486), covering approximately 97,500 acres, and the South Lease Area (Lease OCS-A0487), covering about 67,250 acres. BOEM announced that Deepwater Wind New England LLC was awarded both lease areas. The auction raised a total of $3,838,288 in high bids and took place over the course of one day, spanning 11 rounds.

=== Auction Process ===
On January 16, 2020, Deepwater Wind New England, LLC bid for the 13,700 acre (21.40625 square mile/55.441933 square kilometer) lease OCS-A 0486 which BOEM approved on March 23, 2020. The lease area assigned to Deepwater Wind South Fork, LLC now carries lease number OCS-A 0517.

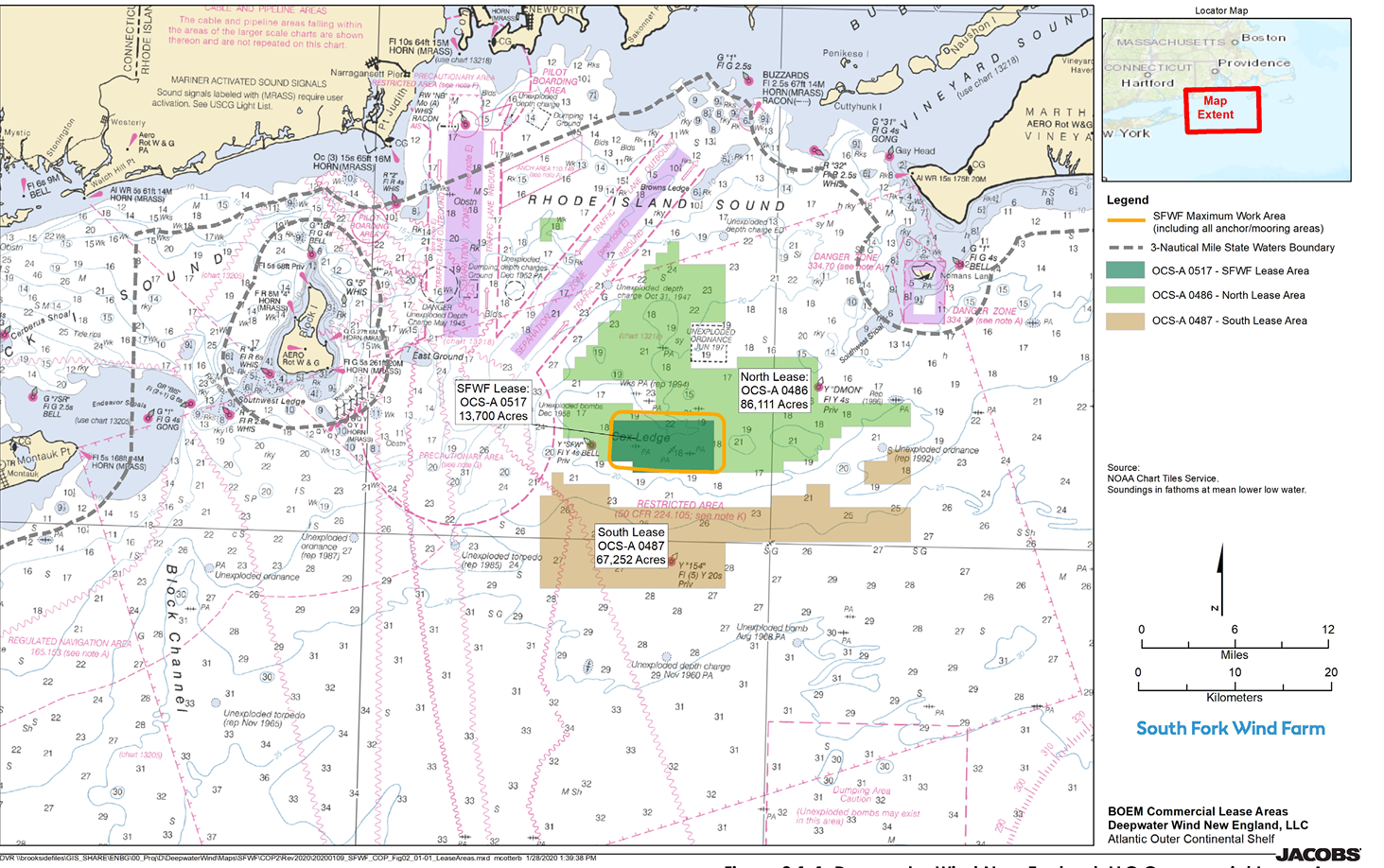
Lease Area Outline for South Fork Wind Farm

== Regulatory and permitting process ==
=== Site Assessment Plan ===
On October 12, 2017, BOEM approved the Site Assessment Plan (SAP) for Lease OCS-A 0486 (Deepwater Wind New England LLC), which authorized the installation of an AXYS FLiDAR 6M™ meteorological buoy within the lease area. The Met Buoy will gather data about energy production estimates and design inputs within the North Lease Area for a wind energy project. Deepwater Wind will contract a vendor to install, operate, and decommission the Met Buoy. The SAP determined that the buoy will not cause damage or harm to the surrounding environment or natural resources.

=== Environmental Impact Statement ===
On October 19, 2018, BOEM issued a Notice of Intent (NOI) to prepare an Environmental Impact Statement (EIS) for the Construction and Operations Plan (COP) submitted by Deepwater Wind South Fork LLC (Deepwater Wind). The NOI publication marked the start of the public scoping process and opened a 30-day comment period during which BOEM hosted public scoping meetings and accepted public comments.

On January 4, 2021, BOEM released a Draft Environmental Impact Statement (DEIS) for the South Fork Wind Farm and South Fork Export Cable Project. During the comment period, BOEM organized three virtual meetings, giving stakeholders the opportunity to learn more about the DEIS, ask questions, and provide oral testimony. On August 16, 2021, BOEM published the Final Environmental Impact Statement (FEIS) for the South Fork Wind Farm and South Fork Export Cable Project.

Four alternatives were considered in the Final Environmental Impact Statement:

- No Action Alternative: Passage of this Alternative would result in BOEM not approving the Construction and Operations Plan (COP), and the project would not move forward with construction. The No Action Alternative is the baseline Alternative that all actions are weighed against.
- Proposed Action: Passage of this Alternative would result in the construction and operation of 15 WTGs each with a 6-12 MW capacity. This proposed alternative included micrositing of WTGs to avoid sensitive cultural resources and marine habitats.
- Vessel Transit Lane alternative (Transit alternative): Passage of this Alternative would result in the construction and operation of 15 WTGs each with a 6-12 MW capacity and the construction of a 4 nautical-mile transit lane bisecting areas of WTGs. This transit lane would allow for increased vessel traffic for commercial fisherman.
- Fisheries Habitat Impact Minimization alternative (Habitat alternative): Passage of this Alternative would result in the construction and operation of 12 WTGs each with a 6-12 MW capacity. The FEIS found that this Alternative would result in fewer adverse environmental impacts than the other action alternatives considered. Within the Habitat Alternative, two WTG layout plans were considered.

A "Preferred Alternative" considered the results of BOEM’s economic feasibility analysis and the perspectives of local governments, tribes, and other stakeholders. BOEM identified Fisheries Habitat Impact Minimization alternative (Habitat alternative) with 12 WTGs as the Preferred Alternative.

=== Record of Decision and Approvals ===
In January, 2020 Deepwater Wind New England, LLC submitted an application assigning 13,700 acres of OCS-A 0486 to Deepwater Wind South Fork, LLC. BOEM assigned the lease are the new number OCS-A 0517. In February, 2020 an updated COP was submitted to address navigational safety issues raised by the commercial fishing industry by changing turbine layout. On January 18, 2022, BOEM approved the Construction and Operations Plan for the South Fork Wind Farm and South Fork Export Cable Project.

In November 2021, BOEM approved the Record of Decision for the South Fork Wind project. The ROD explains the analysis of the FEIS's preferred alternative, and addresses BOEM’s action to approve the COP under section 8(p) of the Outer Continental Shelf Lands Act (OCSLA).

== Finance ==
=== Offtake Agreement ===
In January 2017, the Long Island Power Authority Board of Trustees approved a Power Purchase Agreement (PPA) to buy energy from South Fork for 20 years starting in 2022. The project was the result of a 2015 Request for Proposals (RFP) to meet growing energy demand on Long Island’s South Fork, in which Long Island Power Authority and PSEG Long Island evaluated 21 technology-neutral proposals. The RFP received 21 responses from 16 developers encompassing a wide range of technologies, including offshore wind, solar photovoltaic, lithium-ion batteries, thermal storage, fuel cells, direct load control, aeroderivative combustion turbines, and reciprocating engines. Deepwater Wind was the only offshore wind developer to bid into the South Fork RFP.

The South Fork Offshore Wind Farm was originally proposed as a 90-megawatt project at 16 cents per kWh. Due to extra energy available from improving turbine technology, Long Island Power Authority agreed to purchase an additional 40-megawatts at 8.6 cents per kWh In November 2018. Both prices escalate at an average of 2% per year for 20 years. As Long Island Power Authority is an electric utility, Long Island Power Authority buys the energy, capacity, ancillary services, and renewable energy credits from the project. This is different than some projects where the contracting entity is only purchasing the renewable energy credits, while consumers pay for the other energy attributes through the electric markets. Over the 25-year life of the Long Island Power Authority contract, the wind farm is expected to deliver more than $1 billion in electricity to Long Island Power Authority.

=== Cost and Finance Structure ===
Long Island Power Authority estimates the South Fork Project Portfolio will cost an average residential customer on Long Island between $1.39 and $1.57 per month.

Deepwater Wind, an offshore wind developer based in Rhode Island, was the original developer involved in the proposal of South Fork in 2015. However, in 2018 Danish developer Ørsted entered into an agreement with the D.E. Shaw Group to acquire a 100% equity interest in Deepwater Wind at a purchase price of $510 million. The two companies’ offshore wind assets and organizations merged into the leading US offshore wind platform with the most comprehensive geographic coverage and the largest pipeline of development capacity.

The South Fork Wind Farm ended up totaling $2 billion. The project faced increased costs due to heightened interest rates, rising construction costs (especially for the foundations of the wind turbines), time delays, and supply chain constraints. The uncertainty of the OSW industry led Eversource to sell its 50% ownership stake in South Fork (and Revolution Wind) to Global Infrastructure Partners in February 2024. The sale of South Fork and Revolution Wind allows Eversource to realize approximately $1.1 billion of proceeds upon closing. This transaction officially closed on September 7, 2023, marking the end of Eversource's financial ties to South Fork.

Considering this news, the major stakeholders incurring the costs of the South Fork Wind are New York based investment firm Global Infrastructure Partners and other undisclosed investors. Although Eversource is primarily exiting its financial ties to the project, it will remain a tax equity partner for South Fork Wind, responsible for certain obligations. Ørsted continues to play a significant role in the project, maintaining its involvement in operations.

== Infrastructure development ==
South Fork construction helped build the foundations for a US domestic OSW supply chain and supported Northeast union jobs. Local union workers played a crucial role in staging and assembling all 36 turbines at the New London State Pier in Connecticut, while advanced foundation components were fabricated at Ørsted and Eversource’s ProvPort hub in Rhode Island. In accordance with the Jones Act, South Fork Wind is currently supported by U.S.-built, -crewed and owned crew transfer vessels and offshore wind service operations vessels. Crew vessels and change helicopters operated out of Quonset Point Rhode Island. The project is also noteworthy for featuring the first U.S.-built offshore wind substation, constructed by over 350 U.S. workers from three states, with New York union workers involved in the offshore installation. Key contractors for the project included Haugland Energy Group, which installed the underground duct bank system for the onshore transmission line and led the construction of the onshore interconnection facility. LS Cable was responsible for installing and joining the onshore cables, with additional support from Long Island's Elecnor Hawkeye. Roman Stone manufactured concrete mattresses to protect the undersea cables, while Ljungstrom partnered with Riggs Distler to provide specialized structural steelwork.

In January 2021, New York Governor Andrew Cuomo announced that the South Brooklyn Marine Terminal would be developed to include a wind turbine assembly plant to be partially funded by New York State. Turbines assembled there will be used in three offshore wind farms off the east end of Long Island. South Fork Wind Farm, Beacon Wind and Sunrise Wind are projected to be supplied by 2025 from the new plant, built with $200 million in state funding and $200 million in matching grants. The project is part of a $29 billion 'Green Initiative' plan for New York.

The project is designed to fulfill SFW's contractual commitments to the Long Island Power Authority (LIPA) as per a Power Purchase Agreement from 2017.

=== Construction Timeline ===
Date	Milestone
February 2022	Groundbreaking
May 2023	Onshore cable installed
June 2023	First monopile foundation installed
July 2023	Offshore wind substation installed
August 2023	Onshore substation completed
November 2023	First turbine installed
January 2024	Construction completed

=== Offshore Wind Farm ===
The South Fork Wind Farm marked the beginning of its construction in February 2022, beginning with the onshore export cable system that links the project to the Long Island electric grid. The wind farm reached its first milestone in June 2023 with the installation of the project’s first monopile foundation, and its final turbine was installed in February 2023.

The offshore development of the South Fork Wind Farm involved the installation of 12 wind turbine generators in federal waters on the Outer Continental Shelf. Each turbine has a nameplate capacity of 11 MW, contributing to a total potential generation capacity of 132 MW. This configuration includes 12 specific positions for turbines, as well as two alternate positions to optimize energy production based on site conditions. The turbines will be supported by monopile foundations with diameters of 200 meters.

=== Grid Interconnection ===
==== Onshore Facilities ====
The South Fork Wind Farm established an Operations and Maintenance facility in Montauk, New York. This facility includes office space of up to 1,000 square feet, equipment storage of up to 6,600 square feet, a stationary crane for equipment transfers, and accommodations for up to three crew transfer vessels. The South Fork Export Cable (SFEC) will consist of both offshore and onshore segments, with the onshore component being installed as an underground duct bank. This underground power cable will operate at 138 kV 3-phase HVAC, connecting the wind farm to the SFEC - Interconnection Facility. Located adjacent to the existing LIPA substation on Cove Hollow Road in East Hampton, New York, the SFEC - Interconnection Facility will cover a footprint of up to 230 by 336 feet and reach a maximum height of approximately 43 feet. This facility will house all the necessary equipment for safely connecting the SFEC to the New York Independent System Operator (NYISO) transmission system.

==== Point of Interconnection (POI) ====
The point of interconnection for the South Fork Wind is established at the SFEC - Interconnection Facility, which will connect the SFEC with the existing LIPA 69 kV substation located off Cove Hollow Road in East Hampton.

==== Offshore Facilities ====
The offshore substation is responsible for collecting electric energy generated by the wind turbine generators and transmitting it to the SFEC. The offshore substation includes high voltage power transformers, switchgears, and a supervisory control and data acquisition system to monitor and control operations. The offshore substation was built on a dedicated foundation and houses a small diesel generator rated at up to 400 hp, along with a 500-gallon diesel tank for backup power. Access for maintenance and emergency transport will be facilitated through a helideck and boat landing.

Inter-array cables rated at either 34.5 kV or 66 kV will connect individual wind turbine generators and transfer energy to the offshore substation. These cables will be buried to a target depth of 4 to 6 feet in the seabed, with provisions for additional secondary cable protection in areas where sufficient burial depth cannot be achieved. The installation will also feature a sea-to-shore transition that connects the SFEC - NYS with the SFEC - Onshore, utilizing directional boring techniques to splice offshore and onshore cables efficiently.

== Benefits and concerns ==
=== Socio-Economic ===
In 2020, the Citizens for the Preservation of Wainscott, a group of property owners in the hamlet of Wainscott started a petition to incorporate 4.4 square miles (11 km^{2}) of the community as a village. A driving force of the petition was to fight a proposal for the preferred location for the 138-kilovolt electricity transmission line (export cable) to come ashore in the community at Beach Lane en route to an electrical substation in East Hampton. The effort divided members of the community, with other residents organizing in support of the project. The town board and town trustees have approved the project, granting an easement allowing for the export cable in Wainscott. The petition to separately incorporate was rejected as "legally insufficient" in March 2021.

South Fork Wind signed its Community Benefits Agreement with the Town of East Hampton on March 9, 2021. The agreement contracted South Fork wind to make annual payments of $700,000 to the town for the first 25 years of its operation. If South Fork Wind were to continue operating after 25 years, the annual payments would increase by a 2% escalation factor each year. In addition to annual payments, South Fork paid two installations of $500,000 as milestone payments to the town. South Fork also paid $5,500,500 to the town's community preservation fund. In reaction to much of the prior community controversy, South Fork agreed to fund a fisheries liaison for the duration of its operation and prioritize local job opportunities.

=== Climate and Environment ===
The EPA’s CO-Benefits Risk Assessment (COBRA) model was used to quantify the climate benefits of South Fork Wind. The model estimated 97.39 tons of Nitrogen Dioxide, 53.20 tons of Sulfur Dioxide, and 14.28 tons of Particulate Matter would be avoided annually with the construction and operation of South Fork Wind. During the public comment period, many commenters expressed concerns about the wind farm's impact on the North Atlantic Right Whale. BOEM explained in its Final Environmental Impact Statement that the project would require relatively low vessel maintenance with 2,500 crew transport vessel trips (2 trips per week) over the 25-year life of the project. BOEM does not anticipate any population-level impacts to birds from onshore construction but does note the possibility of avoidance or displacement. However, BOEM does note the possibility that migratory birds over the Atlantic Flyway would experience minor risk of long-term functional habitat loss.

== Current Status and Future Outlook ==
South Fork Wind has been fully operational since March 14, 2024. The project is expected to have a life span of 25 years, which is typical of offshore wind farms, as most become economically unfeasible with emerging technologies. The Construction and Operations Plan (COP) allocated 2 years for the decommissioning of the project.

== See also ==
- Block Island Wind Farm
- Revolution Wind Farm
- Cape Wind
- List of offshore wind farms
- List of offshore wind farms in the United States
- Wind power in Massachusetts
- Wind power in New York
- Wind power in Rhode Island
- Wind power in the United States
