= Revolution Wind =

Offshore wind farm in Rhode Island, United States

Revolution Wind Farm
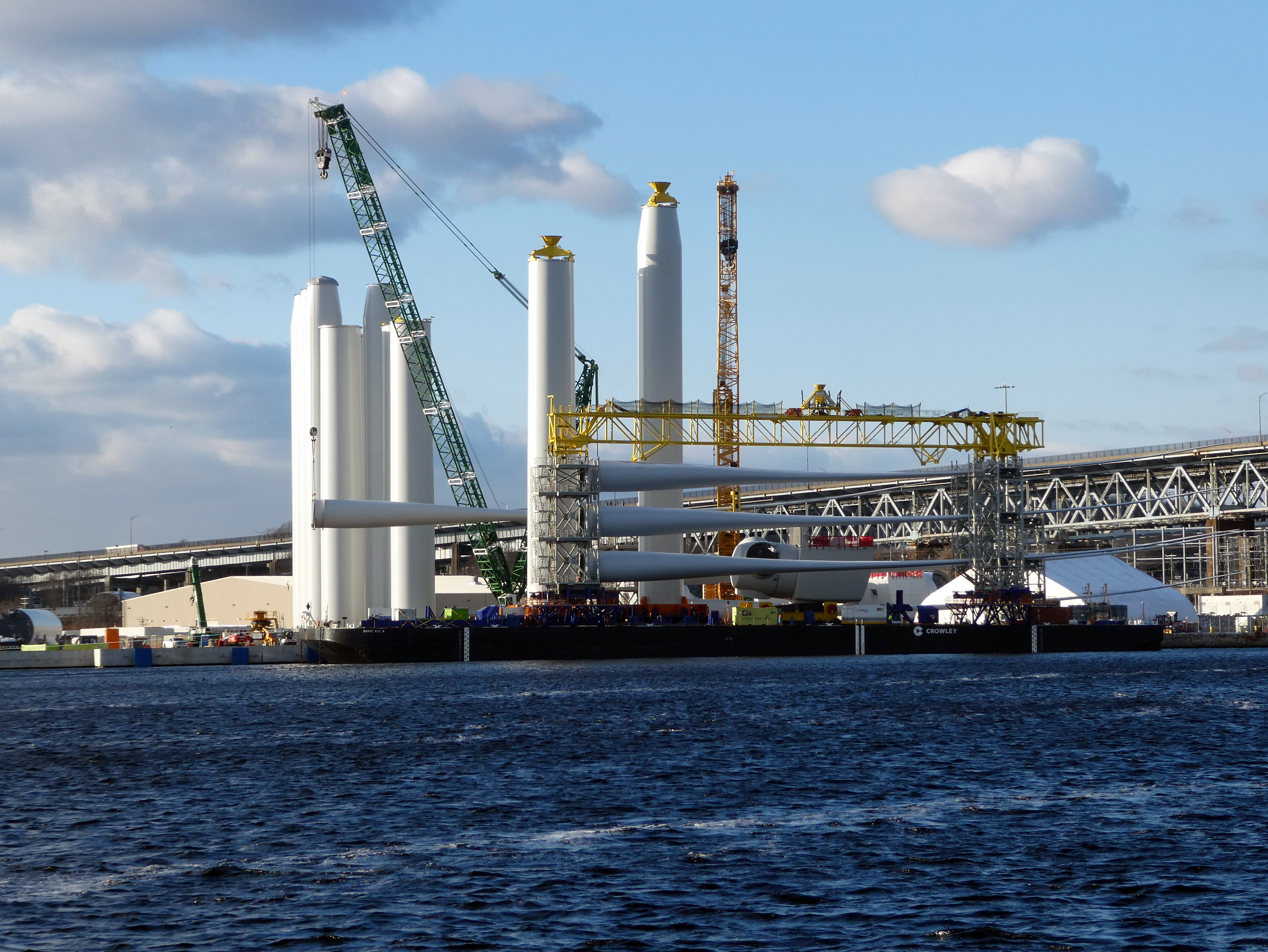
- Wind turbine components for Revolution Wind in New London, CT in December 2024
- Country: United States
- Location: Lease area OCS-A 0486, OCS Rhode Island, 15 mi offshore RI, 32 mi offshore CT, 12 mi offshore MV
- Coordinates: 41.14994°N 71.06998°W
- Status: Operational
- Owners: Ørsted and Skyborn Renewables

Wind farm
- Type: Offshore
- Distance from shore: 15 Miles
- Hub height: 133 metres (436 ft)
- Rotor diameter: 200 meters
- Site area: 83,798 Acres

Power generation
- Nameplate capacity: 704 MW

External links
- Website: https://revolution-wind.com/

Revolution Wind is a 704 MW capacity offshore wind farm off the coast of Rhode Island. The wind farm is located 15 nautical miles (28 km) southeast of Point Judith, Rhode Island, 32 nautical miles (59 km) southeast of Connecticut, and 12 nautical miles (22 km) southwest of Martha's Vineyard. Revolution Wind is located on the Outer Continental Shelf, in a federally-managed lease area (OCS-A 0486) governed by the Bureau of Ocean Energy Management (BOEM). The lease area was acquired by Deepwater Wind New England in 2020, and subsequently segregated into Revolution Wind and South Fork Wind (OCS-A 0517). In August 2025, as part of the Trump Administration's anti-wind-power campaign, the Bureau of Ocean Energy Management issued a stop-work order for construction at Revolution Wind, citing national security interests. In September 2025 a federal judge ruled that work could continue while the court case challenging the order file by the developer Ørsted US Offshore Wind proceeded.

The project originated as a joint venture between Ørsted, a Danish renewable energy company, and Eversource. In February, 2024, Eversource sold its 50 percent ownership to Global Investment Partners (GIP). The project is currently managed in partnership between Ørsted and Skyborn Renewables, a GIP portfolio company.

Revolution Wind is composed of 65 Siemens Gamesa 11.0-200 DD turbines, each with a rated capacity of 11 MW. Power generated by these turbines is sent to the grid through a system of submarine cables, which connects to the onshore point of interconnection at Rhode Island's Quonset Business Park, located in North Kingstown. Energy is then sent through underground cables to Revolution's Davisville onshore substation. The project is the first multi-state offshore wind farm in the United States. It has signed two Power-Purchase Agreements (PPAs) to sell electricity to Rhode Island (400 MW) and Connecticut (304 MW). According to the developer, the project will generate enough electricity to meet the annual consumption of approximately 350,000 homes and will contribute to the creation of "1,200 direct construction jobs and thousands more indirect and induced jobs through investments in the local economy." Rhode Island state officials and Revolution Wind believe that the project will help the Rhode Island achieve its stated goal of reaching 100% renewable energy by 2033. According to Chris Kearns, the Commissioner of the Rhode Island Office of Energy Resources, Revolution Wind is crucial to the success of Rhode Island's Act on Climate, which aims to reach net-zero carbon emissions by 2050.

Revolution Wind's development process spans over 15 years, from beginning environmental assessment in 2011, to securing the lease in 2013, and acquiring approvals and beginning construction in 2023. The first turbine was successfully installed in September 2024. According to the developer, Revolution Wind's turbines are expected to be fully operating in Q2 2026. BOEM issued a stop work order for Revolution Wind's construction in August 2025. In September 2025, a federal judge issued a preliminary injunction that the stop-work order was likely unlawful; by October, Ørsted announced that work had fully resumed and reaffirmed a Q2 2026 completion date.

The wind farm became fully operational in November 2026.

== Development timeline ==
The development of an offshore wind project requires the execution of various processes, including but not to limited to site assessments, project design, lease acquisition, regulatory approval, stakeholder engagement, securing PPAs to sell electricity, construction, and operation. 2011 marks the beginning of efforts to secure Revolution Wind's lease area. Construction of Revolution Wind began in 2023, and 2026 is the year of projected operation.

Early Development & Planning	August - October 2011: Period of Call for Information and Nominations, Notice of Intent (NOI) for environmental assessment.; February 2012: BOEM designates the Rhode Island/Massachusetts Wind Energy Area (WEA).; June 2013: Environmental assessment for WEA announces finding of no significant impact (FONSI).; July 2013: Deepwater Wind New England LLC winds auction for two leases in the WEA.
Environmental Review & Permitting	April 2016: Site Assessment Plan (SAP) for Lease Area OCS-A 0486 is filed.; December 2018: Ørsted signs two Power-Purchase Agreements (PPAs) for 200 and 104 MW with CT utility companies Eversource and United Illuminating, approved by the Connecticut Public Utility Commission.; May 2019: Ørsted signs a 300 MW-PPA with Rhode Island's National Grid utility company, approved by the Rhode Island Public Utility Commission.; March 2020: Initial version of the Constructions and Operations Plan (COP) is submitted.; March 2020: BOEM approves the segregation of Lease Area OCS-A 0486 into two leases: OCS-A 0486 for Revolution Wind and OCS-A 0517 for South Fork Wind Farm.; September 2022: BOEM issues a notice of availability (NOA), allowing public feedback and hearings regarding the overview of the proposed project. The public feedback period ended October 17, 2022.; July 2023: The Final Environmental Impact Statement (FEIS) is published based on the March 2023 version of the COP.
Record of Decision & Approvals	August 2023: Joint Record of Decision (ROD) is signed by BOEM, the National Marine Fisheries Service (NMFS), and the United States Army Corps of Engineers (USACE).; October 2023: Ørsted and Eversource take FID (Final Investment Decision) for Revolution Wind.; November 2023: BOEM approves the final COP for the Revolution Wind Farm and Revolution Wind Export Cable Project.
Construction & Installation	August 2023: Construction begins on Revolution Wind.; February 2024: Eversource sold its 50% stake in Revolution Wind to Skyborn Renewables, a Global Infrastructure Partners (GIP) portfolio company.; September 2024: First turbine is installed.; August 2025: Work halted by Bureau of Ocean Energy Management.; September 2025: Work resumes following federal judge lifting the stop work order.; Q2 2026: Anticipated year of project operation.

== Lease Area ==
=== Location ===
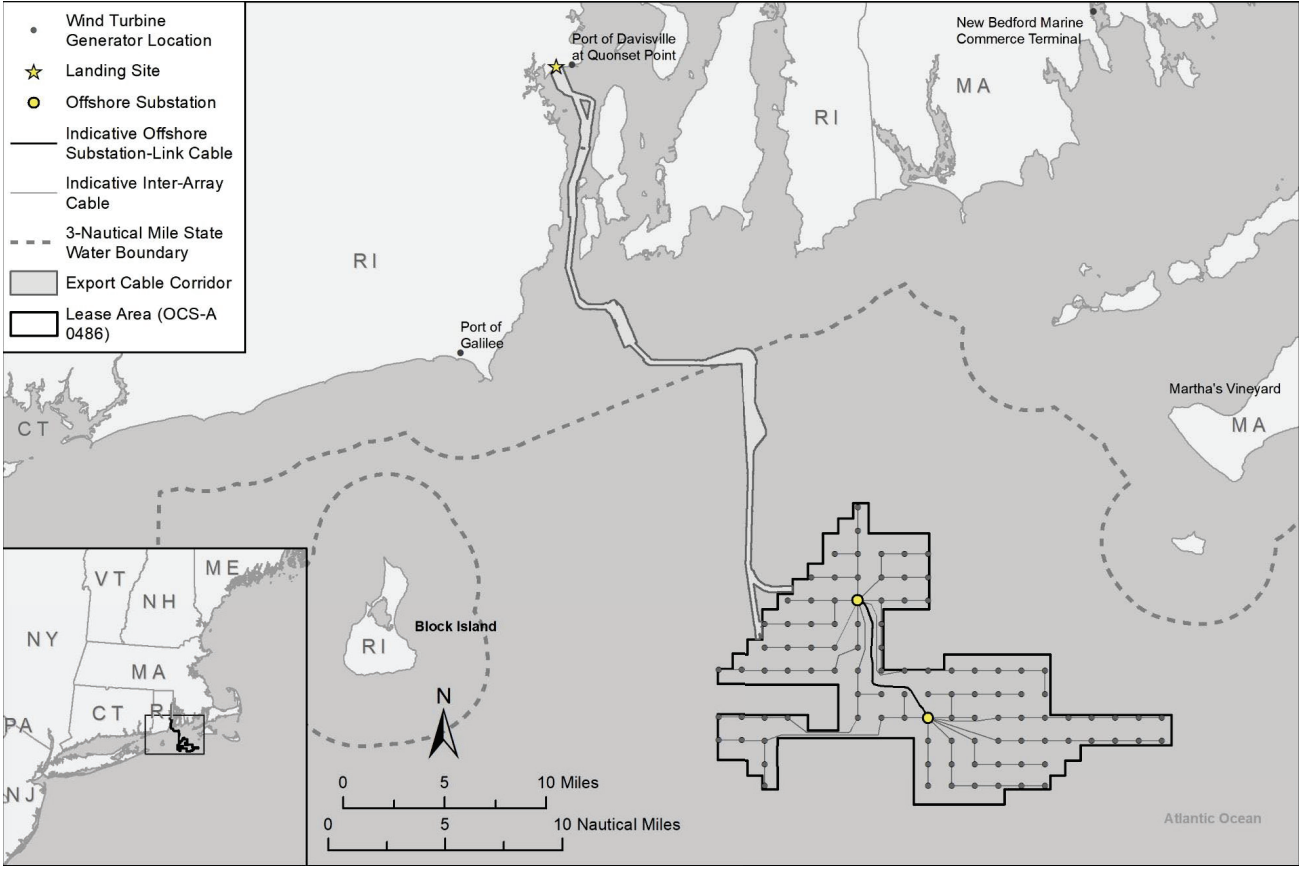
Revolution Wind Lease Area and Infrastructure

The Revolution Wind project is located in Lease Area OCS-A 0486, an 83,798-acre area 15 nautical miles south of Rhode Island, 32 nautical miles southeast of Connecticut, and 12 nautical miles southwest of Martha's Vineyard. The lease area is part of the Rhode Island/Massachusetts Wind Energy Area (RI/MA WEA), a 164,750 acre "area of mutual interest." The project makes landfall at Quonset Business Park in North Kingstown, Rhode Island. The landfall cable connects to the existing Davisville Substation via underground transmission cables.

=== History of Lease Area ===
BOEM is required by the Outer Continental Shelf Lands Act (OCSLA) to award offshore wind lease areas competitively, through a "Call for Information and Nominations" process. In August 2011, BOEM initiated a "Call" for the Outer Continental Shelf of Rhode Island and Massachusetts. The public comment period for the "Call" closed in October 2011, resulting in eight "indications of interest." In July 2012, BOEM released an Environmental Assessment (EA) to determine the environmental impacts of leasing and performing site characterization in a Wind Energy Area (WEA). On June 4, 2013, BOEM issued a "Finding of No Significant Impact" (FONSI), which determined that the leasing activities within the WEA would not cause a significant impact on the environment. BOEM published a Proposed Sale Notice for the Rhode Island/Massachusetts WEA on December 3, 2012.

On July 31, 2013, BOEM successfully auctioned the area—split into two lease areas—in the United States' first competitive lease sale. The sale received "$3,838,288 in high bids," and the auction lasted one day. Deepwater Wind New England LLC won both leases. The WEA was split into the North Lease Area (OCS-A 0486), totaling 97,500 acres, and the South Lease Area (OCS-A 0487), 67,250 acres. Deepwater Wind did not conduct site assessment activity for the South Lease Area (OCS-A 0487).

On March 23, 2020, BOEM approved an application to assign the 13,700 acres of OCS-A 0468 to Deepwater Wind South Fork LLC, which is now OCS-A 0517. The remaining 83,798 acres of OCS-A 0468 were assigned to DWW Rev I. Deepwater Wind South Fork LLC changed its name to South Fork Wind LLC, and DWW Rev I changed its name to Revolution Wind LLC.

Revolution Wind has a 25-year term of operations from the Construction and Operations Plan (COP) approval date, November 17, 2023.

== Regulatory & permitting process ==
=== Site Assessment Plan (SAP) ===
The Revolution Wind project underwent extensive regulatory approvals between 2020 and 2023, led by BOEM as the primary federal agency responsible for offshore wind project permitting. The regulatory review process involved multiple federal, state, and local agencies to ensure compliance with environmental, navigational, and energy-related regulations. In offshore wind projects, the SAP functions as an evaluation tool used to assess potential design, layout, and engineering considerations concerning a particular site. In 2016, prior to regulatory approvals, the Site Assessment Plan (SAP) for Lease Area OCS-A 0486 was filed. Once BOEM approved the segregation of Lease Area OCS-A 0486 into two leases, OCS-A 0486 for Revolution Wind and OCS-A 0517 for South Fork Wind Farm, the SAP for Revolution Wind was approved in 2020. Following the SAP, Revolution Wind developrs submitted its initial Construction and Operations Plan (COP) in 2020 received approval from BOEM in 2023. Following the COP, BOEM releases a Notice of Intent (NOI) to prepare an Environmental Impact Statement (EIS).

=== Environmental Impact Statement (EIS) ===
BOEM played a central role in the permitting process by reviewing and ultimately approving the project's COP. The initial COP was submitted on October 30, 2020, with subsequent updates provided in April 2021, December 2021, July 2022, and March 2023. The COP approval process included extensive environmental and technical evaluations to assess the project's impact on marine ecosystems, navigation, cultural resources, and other key areas. The COP process is informed by various assessment processes through the Endangered Species Act (ESA), the Clean Water Act, and Environmental Protection Agency (EPA) Permitting.

==== Endangered Species Act & Marine Mammal Protection Act Approvals ====
The National Marine Fisheries Service (NMFS) conducted a biological assessment under the ESA and issued a Letter of Authorization (LOA) under the Marine Mammal Protection Act (MMPA) for the incidental take of marine mammals during construction and operation. This decision followed an extensive review process that evaluated potential risks to species such as the North Atlantic right whale, requiring mitigation measures such as seasonal construction restrictions, vessel speed limits, and noise reduction technologies. Additionally, NMFS completed an Essential Fish Habitat (EFH) Consultation to evaluate the impact of construction on fish populations and aquatic habitats, leading to recommendations for monitoring and mitigation measures.

==== Clean Water Act & Rivers and Harbors Act Permits ====
The U.S. Army Corps of Engineers (USACE) was responsible for reviewing the project's compliance with the Clean Water Act (Section 404) and the Rivers and Harbors Act (Section 10). The Individual Permit issued by USACE approved dredging, seabed modifications, and the placement of infrastructure in navigable waters. The FEIS evaluated sediment disturbance, water quality, and potential impacts to benthic habitats, leading to specific conditions for dredging and material disposal to minimize environmental harm.

==== Environmental Protection Agency (EPA) Permitting ====
The Environmental Protection Agency (EPA) issued an Outer Continental Shelf (OCS) Air Permit to regulate emissions from construction and operational activities. The permit ensures compliance with the Clean Air Act and requires continuous air quality monitoring during project implementation.

==== Federal Aviation Administration (FAA) Approval ====
Since the wind turbines have the potential to affect air traffic radar and aviation navigation, the Federal Aviation Administration (FAA) conducted an Obstruction Evaluation/Airspace Analysis. The FAA approved the project, with conditions requiring that all turbines comply with aircraft lighting and marking standards to ensure visibility for pilots and air traffic controllers.

==== Summary of alternatives ====
In submitting the COP and Final Environmental Impact Statement (FEIS), for a decision from BOEM about the proposed project, Revolution Wind considered alternatives to the Proposed Action, including analysis of potential benefits or consequences. These alternatives contain changes to design, siting, construction, and decommissioning, taking into account a variety of factors.

Alternative A, or the "No Action Alternative," entails BOEM disapproving the action, construction, installation, and decommissioning of the project. As such, no benefits nor detriments are put into place associated with the Revolution Wind project. Alternative A is the proposed action in the COP: the FEIS analyzes the impacts of this action. Alternative B, or the "Proposed Action Alternative," recommends up to 100 Wind Turbine Generators (WTGs) with 8-12 MW capacity, fulfilling the 704 MW PPAs with CT and RI, two offshore substations (OSS), inter-array cables (IACs), one onshore substation (OnSS), an interconnection facility (ICF), and grid spacing 1 nautical mile apart. Alternative C is the "Habitat Impact Minimization Alternative," eliminating certain wind turbine generators (WTGs), leaving merely 65 WTGs, and asserting even spacing of WTGs to protect complex fisheries habitats. Alternative D removes any WTGs that are adjacent to or interfere with transit areas while maintaining even spacing. Alternative D seeks to reduce impact to navigation, leaving up to 78 WTGs. Alternative E reduces the visual impact to culturally important resources and areas by utilizing fewer miles of WTG locations and fewer WTGs (up to 81). Alternative F calls for the use of higher-capacity WTGs (up to 14 MW), which would allow for the removal of some WTGs, reducing impact on marine habitats and visual impacts to resources, as well as navigational concerns. Revolution Wind ultimately decided against 14 MW turbines because although they produce less environmental and cultural impacts, implementing less turbines would require rearranging the configuration of cables and substations, creating a plethora of setbacks for project development.

Alternative G is indicated as the Preferred Alternative and was designed in consideration of benthic habitat and visual impact on cultural resources, and includes up to 79 positions for 65 WTGs at 8-12 MW capacity. Alternative G was the chosen alternative. Alternative G, the chosen alternative, represents a hybrid alternative, as it includes features from other proposed alternatives, with the goal of reducing the impact on marine and benthic habitats, as well as reducing visual impacts to culturally significant resources. It utilizes the same offshore and onshore infrastructure as proposed in the COP, as well as 1 nautical mile × 1 nautical mile grid spacing. The alternative includes 79 possible positions for up to 65 WTGs. The 79 positions were chosen for their reduced impact on habitat and visual resources. The design accounts for future adjustments necessary to accommodate for habitat or cultural resources, as the 65 WTGs may be placed at any of the 14 "spare" locations.

In October 2023, BOEM granted the final approval for the project's Construction and Operations Plan (COP). The approval included requirements for ongoing environmental monitoring, reporting to regulatory agencies, and adherence to mitigation conditions. The project's compliance will be monitored by BOEM, NMFS, USACE, and EPA, with periodic evaluations to ensure that all environmental and operational conditions are met throughout construction and operation.

=== Record of Decision (ROD) ===
On August 22, 2023, BOEM issued its Joint Record of Decision (ROD) in collaboration with the National Marine Fisheries Service (NMFS) and the U.S. Army Corps of Engineers (USACE). This decision officially authorized the construction of up to 65 wind turbines and two offshore substations, subject to specific environmental protection measures.

The Revolution Wind project also required approvals at the state level. The Rhode Island Coastal Resources Management Council (RI CRMC) conducted a Coastal Zone Management Act (CZMA) Consistency Certification, ensuring that the project aligns with Rhode Island's coastal policies. The Rhode Island Department of Environmental Management (RIDEM) issued a Section 401 Water Quality Certification in August 2021, confirming that the project meets water quality standards. Additionally, the Massachusetts Office of Coastal Zone Management (MA CZM) issued a CZMA consistency concurrence in May 2023.

=== Next steps in the Regulatory Process ===
Following these approvals, construction began in January 2024, with the first wind turbines expected to be operational by July 2025. The regulatory process includes provisions for adaptive management, allowing agencies to modify conditions if unexpected environmental impacts arise. Future assessments will evaluate the project's performance in terms of marine wildlife impacts, emissions, fisheries interactions, and energy production efficiency.

== Finance ==
=== Offtake Agreements (PPAs) ===
Revolution Wind is a $1.5 billion project, financed through two Power Purchase Agreements (PPAs) with Rhode Island and Connecticut. A PPA allows offshore wind project developers to sell electricity at a fixed price to utility or commercial customers, acting as a form of revenue stabilization. State governments require utility providers to purchase a specific amount of offshore wind power.

In 2014, Rhode Island passed the Affordable Clean Energy Security Act (ACES), which establishes a process for Rhode Island to invest in renewable energy resources. ACES requires the Rhode Island Public Utility Commission (PUC) to solicit 600–1,000 MW of offshore wind capacity by 2022. As a result, in 2019, the Rhode Island PUC approved a PPA between Revolution Wind and Rhode Island's National Grid utility company. The Rhode Island PPA secures 400 MW of electricity for Rhode Island over a 20-year period. National Grid pays 9.84 cents per kilowatt hour. National Grid "expects to earn $4.6 million over the 20-year agreement," through the sale of Renewable Energy Credits (RECs). RECs are sold when electricity from an offshore wind project are delivered to the energy grid.

In 2018, the Connecticut Public Utility Regulatory Authority approved a 200 MW PPA with CT utility companies Eversource and United Illuminating, for 9.95 cents per kilowatt hour. Later, the state secured an additional PPA for 104 MW at 9.843 cents per kilowatt hour.

These PPAs will help Connecticut meet its mandate of 2,000 MW of offshore wind energy by 2030, as outlined in Connecticut Public Act 19–71, and support Rhode Island's goal of 100% renewable energy by 2030, as outlined in Rhode Island Governor's Executive Order 20-01.

=== Project financing ===
On October 31, 2023, joint venture partners Ørsted and Eversource announced their final investment decision (FID) for Revolution Wind, marking the end of the evaluation and assessment process. The FID represents the "official commitment" to begin construction and fulfill the project. An FID encompasses evaluation of a project's Technical Feasibility, Economic Analysis, Risk Assessment, and Regulatory Compliance.

The project is expected to qualify for the Inflation Reduction Act (IRA)'s "Energy Community Credit." This credit allows for an additional 10% deduction of development costs.

In February 2024, Eversource sold its 50% stake in Revolution Wind (and South Fork Wind) to Global Infrastructure Partners (GIP) for approximately $745 million. This sale marked Eversource's complete divestment in offshore wind energy, resulting in a net loss of $520 million for the company. The project is now a 50:50 joint venture developed by Ørsted and Skyborn Renewables, a GIP portfolio company.

The project represents a significant investment in Rhode Island and Connecticut's clean energy future, including:

- Over $100 million direct investment in the State Pier redevelopment project in New London, Connecticut.
- Over $100 million investment in the establishment of a regional offshore wind foundation component manufacturing facility at ProvPort.
- $35 million investment in Regional Offshore Wind Logistics and Operations Hub at Quonset Point.
- $1.8 million investment in Quonset State Airport for crew helicopter facilities.
- $1 million investment in training partnership with the Community College of Rhode Island.
- $1.25 million contribution to Mystic Aquarium for marine research.
- $950,000 contribution to Project Oceanology for K-12 STEM education programs.

== Infrastructure development ==
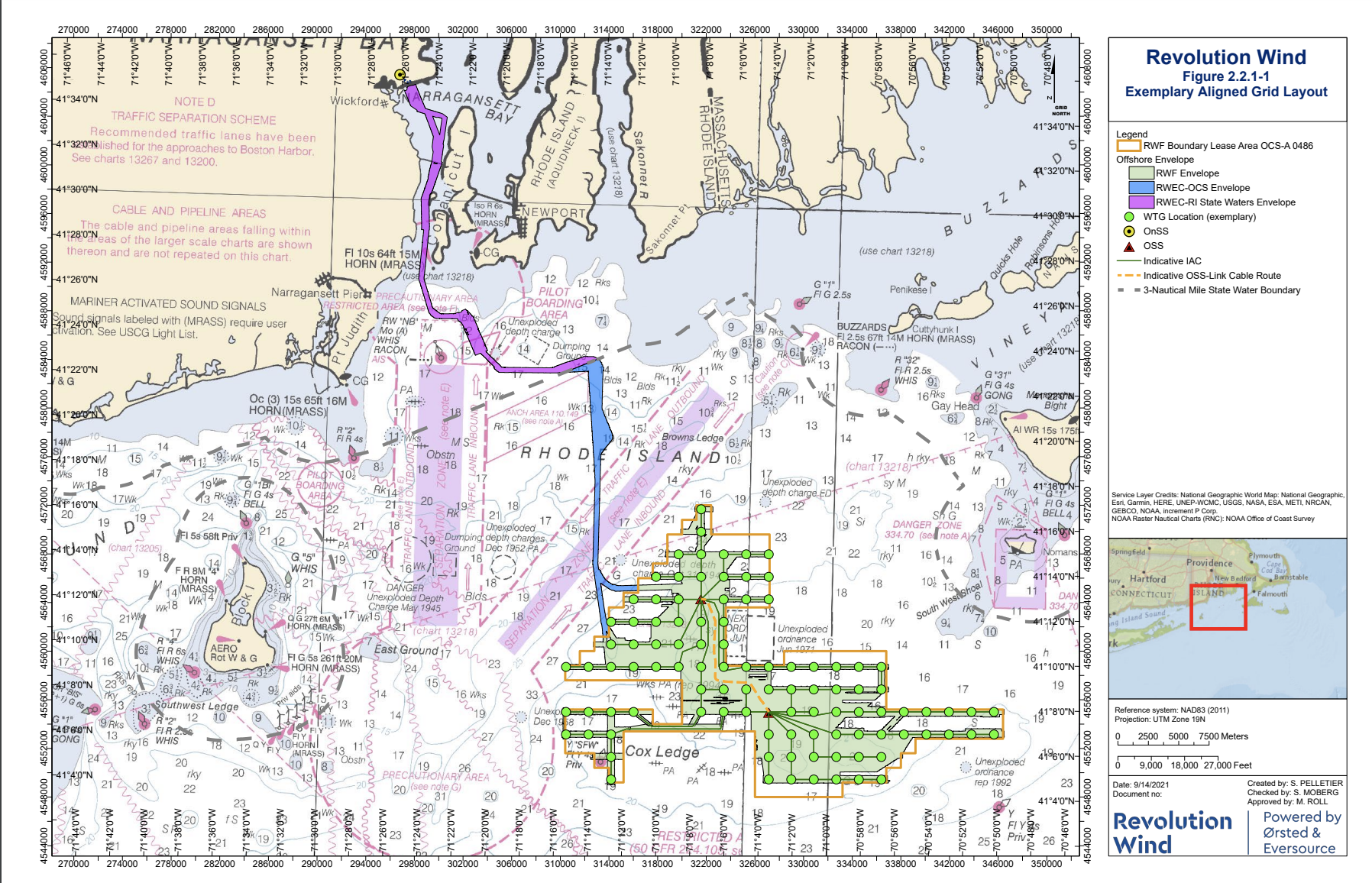
Revolution Wind Proposed WTG Layout

=== Offshore wind farm ===
The project will include up to 100 wind turbine generators, which are connected by inter-array cables (IACs). Additionally, it will include up to two Offshore Substations (OSSs), and up to two submarine export cables. Each wind turbine generator will be supported by a fixed-bottom monopile foundation, which has a maximum diameter of 39 ft and a maximum embedment depth of 164 ft. The project uses 65 11.0-200 DD Siemens Gamesa Turbines, which have a 200-meter rotor diameter and a blade length of 97 meters. The swept area totals 31,400 meters, and a hub height of 133 meters. Based on the chosen turbine, the rotor diameter will range from 538 to 722 ft and the hub height will range from 377 to 512 ft.

The inter-array cables used to connect the wind turbines with offshore substations will be buried 4 to 6 ft deep, adding up to a total length of up to 155 miles.

In designing the infrastructure and development of the project, Revolution devised several alternatives to account for minimizing impact, maximizing used space, etc. They proposed two alternative WTG layout designs. The east–west layout positions turbines in east–west lines in order to minimize wakes. The Aligned Grid layout arranges the WTGs 1.15 miles from each other and aligns them with other surrounding offshore wind projects. Revolution Wind chose the Aligned Grid layout as the chosen alternative.

The WTG foundations were chosen based on the size of WTG, environmental risks, and installation. Monopile foundations were chosen as the preferred alternative due to their commercial availability, limited seabed disturbance, and site-specific constraints.

=== Grid interconnection ===
The two offshore substations will be connected via up to 9 miles of link cable. The export cables will be buried 4–6 ft deep and will total up to 42 miles. The 65 turbines owned by Revolution Wind will generate electricity that will be sent to an onshore Point of Interconnection (POI) at Quonset Business Park in North Kingstown, Rhode Island, via submarine cables. This site serves as the main point of injection for the project into the local electrical grid. The electricity will then be transported to the pre-existing Davisville onshore substation via subterranean wires. There will also be an Onshore Substation (OnSS) and Interconnection Facility (ICF), which connect to the Davisville Substation. With the help of this infrastructure, Revolution Wind's renewable energy output will be seamlessly connected to the grid, guaranteeing Rhode Island and Connecticut a steady supply of clean energy.

Onshore, there will be a Landfall Work Area, totaling up to 3.1 acres. This area is designed as a staging area to prepare construction materials. Connecting the Landfall Work Area to the Onshore Substation will be an Onshore Transmission Cable, which will be up to 1 mile long. The OnSS will take up 3.8 acres, and the ICF will be 1.6 acres.

The project also considered alternative grid points of interconnection based on proximity to the lease area and existing infrastructure but ultimately chose the Davisville Substation as the preferred alternative. This selection included export cables traveling through the West Passage to Narragansett Bay before making landfall at Quonset Point in North Kingstown, Rhode Island. This route was chosen as advantageous due to minimal environmental constraints and short overland distance.

Siting alternatives for Onshore Transmission Cables considered hazardous materials, coastal resource uses, property ownership, Environmental Justice areas, and more. The preferred alternative route for these cables follows the access roads from landfall to the Davisville Substation.

Onshore Substation and Interconnection Facilities were chosen in consideration of proximity to grid interconnection point and waterways. The preferred alternative property is a 15-acre area adjacent to the Davisville Substation.

=== Port development ===
Part of Revolution Wind's construction includes development of several ports in Rhode Island and Connecticut.

ProvPort: Revolution Wind has invested over $100 million into the creation of a construction hub at ProvPort in Providence, Rhode Island. Construction materials made at ProvPort include platforms, railings, ladders, and more. Additionally, Ørsted's service operations vessel (SOV), the ECO Edison, is stationed at ProvPort. The vessel is Jones-Act compliant and US-built. It services the project and is where the wind turbine technicians work throughout the project's construction. Riggs Distler, a contractor company, is working with Revolution Wind developers on the construction of the turbines, at the ProvPort assembly hall. Revolution Wind suggests that their investment in ProvPort will directly contribute to the creation of 125 union jobs.

Quonset Point: Revolution Wind has invested $35 million in Quonset Point to aid in the creation of a Regional Offshore Wind Logistics and Operations Hub. Revolution Wind is working with the Quonset Development Corporation, investing in the creation of a building, an access road, and an aviation ramp. They have also built five new offshore crew transfer vessels (CTVs), which are kept at Quonset Point. Additionally, Revolution Wind signed a joint-venture agreement with HeliService International. The contract includes the creation of new crew helicopters to be kept at Quonset Point. The agreement represents the first offshore wind helicopter agreement in the U.S., and includes a $1.8 million investment in Quonset State Airport.

State Pier: Revolution Wind is also partnering with Connecticut, Connecticut Port Authority, and Gateway Terminal, to revitalize the State Pier in New London, Connecticut. Ørsted has invested $310 million to transform the pier into a heavy-lift marine terminal, staging center, and offshore wind energy hub. The Pier is the only offshore wind staging center on the East Coast with direct access to the water. Its redevelopment includes two heavy-lift platforms and has aided in the building and marshaling of 160 turbines.

=== Construction timeline ===
Activity	Duration	Time
Onshore Substation and Interconnection Facility	Approx. 18 months	Q3 2023 - Q1 2025
Onshore Transmission Cable	Approx. 12 months	Q3 2023 - Q3 2024
Landfall Construction	Approx. 6 months	Q4 2023 - Q1 2024
Revolution Wind Export Cables (including route clearance)	Approx. 5 months	Q3 2024 - Q4 2023
Wind Turbine Generators	Approx. 8 months	Q2 2024 - Q4 2024
Inter-Array Cables (including route clearance)	Approx. 8 months	Q1 2024 - Q2 2024; Q3 2024 - Q4 2024
Onshore Substations (including foundations and OSS-Link Cable)	Approx. 6 months	Q2 2024; Q3 2024 - Q4 2024; Q1 2025

== Benefits and concerns ==
=== Socio-economic ===
In terms of Community Benefit Agreements (CBAs), it does not appear that Revolution Wind has negotiated any CBAs with community towns. However, Revolution Wind's developers have developed specific arrangements with a variety of stakeholders. For instance, Revolution Wind set up a compensation program with Rhode Island Fisheries and the Coastal Community Fund. The compensation program allocates $300,000 for a Coastal Community Fund, $333,333 for a voucher program to facilitate radar systems, and $300,000 for a project effects study. Aside from this, Revolution Wind claims that their offshore wind energy project would provide direct benefits to the states of Rhode Island and Connecticut, and even the U.S. supply chain. Revolution Wind's investment in long-term infrastructure improvement at various ports, such as ProvPort, Quonset, and State Pier, plans to expedite growth in New England's blue economy. Revolution Wind invested $77.5 million in Connecticut ports and $40 million in Rhode Island ports. Through investments in various local ports, Revolution Wind has stated their aim to create union jobs, local supply chain contracts, and resilient infrastructure. Also of interest, Revolution Wind signed the first-ever U.S. offshore wind helicopter agreement and subsequently invested $1.8 million in Quonset State Airport.

In 2022, Ørsted and Eversource signed the National Offshore Wind Agreement with North America's Building Trades Unions, establishing a partnership composed of 15 International Union Presidents. This collaboration aims to enforce equity, allocates hundreds of millions of dollars in middle-class wages, and generates apprenticeship and career-oriented programs. In essence, the National Offshore Wind Agreement commits developers to carving out job opportunities for disadvantaged communities, often ones impacted by environmental injustice, and ensures safe and well-trained employees in the industry.

=== Climate and environment ===
In Revolution Wind's EIS, consideration is given to areas like cultural resources, environmental justice, marine mammals, fish habitat, vessel traffic, and various other environmental elements. Revolution Wind's location is situated upon greatly desired fishing grounds, a prime spot for bluefish, cod, black sea bass, and blackfish. Thus, Revolution Wind has spent time negotiating with fishermen and the Fisheries Advisory Board, discussing pertinent components related to the project like lost and damaged gear, business interruption, and a communication plan. Orsted and Eversource have agreed to compensate commercial and charter boat fishermen $12.9 million, a sum of money intended to offset potential revenue loss due to noise pollution, electromagnetic field waves, boulder moving, and other considerations involved in laying undersea cables down in sensitive marine ecosystems. Additionally, Revolution Wind's developers agreed to contribute $300,000 to a study aiming to examine how RWF would imiplicate native species. In the event that this study reveals immense harm to native species, Orsted and Eversource have committed to contributing $5 million to compensate for damages. As it currently stands, fisheries that harvest the spiny dogfish, Atlantic herring, and the American lobster are thought to be implicated by Revolution Wind and thus experience revenue risks. Some fishermen seem content with Orsted and Eversource's offerings, and others are less appeased. David Monti, boat captain of Rhode Island Fishing, expressed hopeful sentiments regarding Revolution Wind's concessions and mitigation measures. For instance, Revolution Wind avoids pile driving and other disturbing seafloor activities in order to protect Atlantic cod populations.

=== Cultural ===
In 2021, various tribes across the United States were consulted by BOEM on offshore wind projects. For Revolution Wind's site, the tribes of interest include the Wampanoag Tribe of Gay Head (Aquinnah), the Mohegan Tribe of Connecticut, and the Mashantucket Pequot Tribe of Connecticut due to their federal recognition status and locational proximity to the project. Revolution Wind offers the ERIF Tribal Assistance Program, a federal grant that funds the ability for Tribes to engage in the environmental review processes amongst others. Additionally, Revolution Wind has created a Memorandum of Agreement (MOA) for Tribal Nations, outlining marine areas of impact and visual areas of potential effects. However, on their website, Revolution Wind has claimed that no tribes have formally signed the MOA. Despite this, tribes still participate in consultations and have opportunities to bring concerns to the table.

Many tribal nations rely on charter and recreational fishermen to provide sustenance for the community. William ("Buddy") Vanderhoop, a charter fishermen from the Wampanoag Tribe of Gay Head (Aquinnah), has noticed the implications of Revolution Wind's construction on the local waters. In 2024, Vanderhoop declared, "This summer, when they started Revolution Wind's construction, was by far the worst year for catching fish of any size that I've ever experienced. The only place I was able to get consistent bites was on the far eastern side of Nantucket, away from any offshore wind activity... Revolution Wind's surveying activity, pile-driving, construction, and extra vessel traffic has driven the fish away. People pay me to find fish, and if I can't find fish, I'm out of business." Aside from socio-economic, environmental, and cultural concerns, the livelihoods of Indigenous peoples are also a part of the equation when determining the implications of the Revolution Wind project.

== Construction history ==
=== Early construction ===
Revolution Wind is currently in the construction phase. As of September 3, 2024, they had successfully installed at least one Siemens Gamesa turbine. According to Revolution's developers, Ørsted and Skyborn Renewables, the project is expected to be fully operational by 2026. Completion was delayed one year from the original 2025 target because of unexpectedly extensive soil contamination from a former Navy landfill at the site of the onshore substation at Quonset Park in Kingstown, Rhode Island.

According to weekly construction updates posted on the Revolution Wind website, as of February 10, 2025, the project had completed conduit proofing at Quonset Park, which was the process of preparing underwater cables to be buried, ensuring they are able to withstand abrasion and entanglement. Additionally, the project has completed indoor and outdoor electrical equipment construction at the interconnection facility.

=== Stop work order and resumption ===
On January 21, 2025, President Trump signed an Executive Order that halts the leasing and permitting of offshore wind sites going forward. Even though Revolution Wind had been fully permitted and construction was already underway, in August 2025, the Bureau of Ocean Energy Management issued a stop-work order for the project, citing unspecified national security interests.

In September 2025, a federal judge lifted the stop-work order in a preliminary injunction while the order was challenged in court, on the grounds that the government was likely to lose on the merits and that the company would suffer irreparable harm. In October 2025, Ørsted announced that work had fully resumed; Revolution Wind is expected to begin operations in the second half of 2026.
