= Newport Tower (Rhode Island) =

Remains of 17th-century windmill in the United States

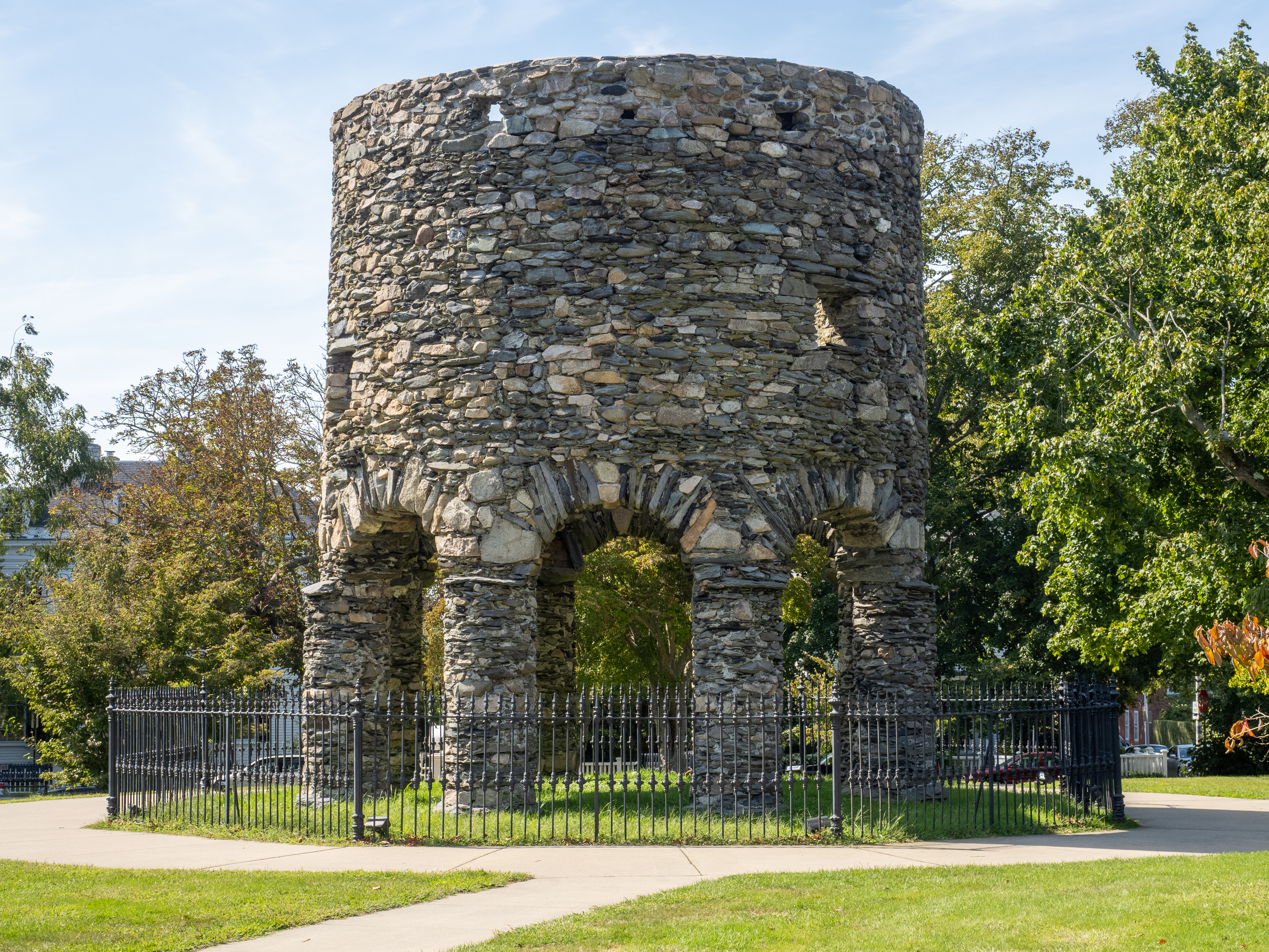
- The Newport Tower.
- Interactive map of Newport Tower

Origin
- Mill name: Newport Tower
- Mill location: Newport, Rhode Island
- Coordinates: 41.4858°N 71.3099°W
- Year built: Mid-17th century

Information
- Purpose: Corn mill
- Type: Tower mill

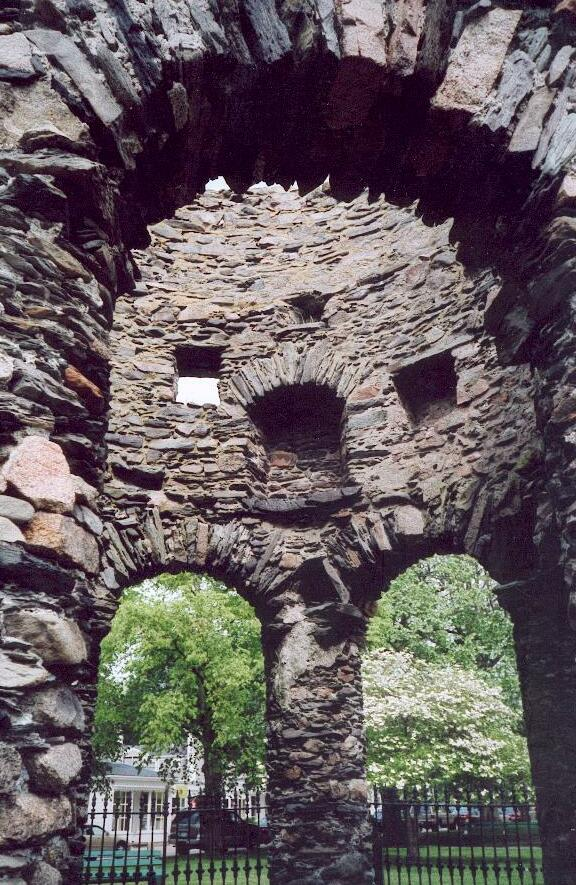
Interior

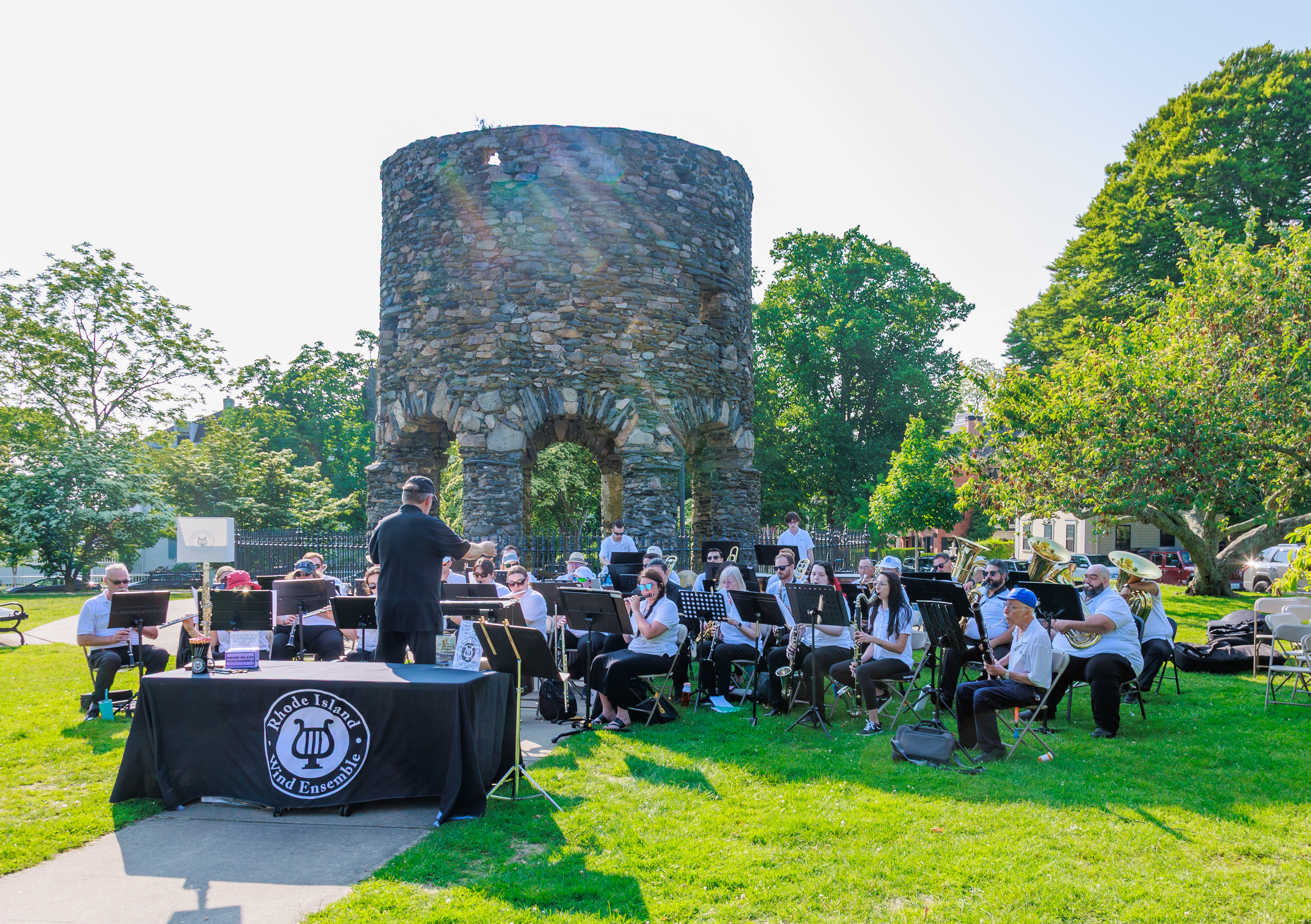
The tower provides a dramatic backdrop for park events

The Newport Tower, also known as the Old Stone Mill, is a round stone tower located in Touro Park in Newport, Rhode Island. Other names given to the tower include Round Tower, Touro Tower, Viking Tower, and Newport Stone Tower.

The structure is about 28 feet tall and 22 to 23 feet across. It is believed to most likely be remains of a windmill built in the mid-17th century. Carbon-14 testing of mortar in the tower indicates a date in the 1600s, making it one of the oldest buildings in the continental United States.

The tower has also received attention due to speculation it is actually several centuries older, and evidence of pre-Columbian trans-oceanic contact. But these ideas have little or no support among mainstream scholars.

== Description ==
The Newport Tower is located in Touro Park at the top of Mill Street, surrounded by a historical residential neighborhood on the hill above the waterfront tourist district. Eighteenth-century paintings show that the hill itself once furnished a view of the harbor and would have been visible to passing mariners in Narragansett Bay, but recent tree growth now obscures the view.

The Newport Tower is not exactly circular. From southeast to northwest, the diameter reportedly measures 22 feet 2 inches (6.76 m) but, when measured from east to west, the diameter lengthens to 23 feet 3 inches (7.09 m). However, the 19th-century measurements of the interior gave an east–west dimension of 18 feet 4 inches (5.59 m), which was slightly shorter than the north–south measurement of 19 feet 9 inches (6.02 m), suggesting that the discrepancies may be due to the unevenness of the rubble masonry. The tower has a height of 28 feet (8.5 m) and an exterior width of 24 feet (7.3 m). At one time, the interior of the tower was coated with smooth white plaster, the remnants of which may be seen on the interior faces of several pillars. It is supported by eight cylindrical columns that form stone arches, two of which are slightly broader than the other six. Above the arches and inside the tower is evidence of a floor that once supported an interior chamber. The walls are approximately 3 feet (0.91 m) thick, and the diameter of the inner chamber is approximately 18 feet (5.5 m). The chamber has four windows on what used to be the main floor, and three very small ones at the upper level. Almost directly opposite the west window is a fireplace backed with grey stone and flanked by nooks.

A representation of the tower is featured prominently on the seal and unit patch of the former US Navy vessel USS Newport.

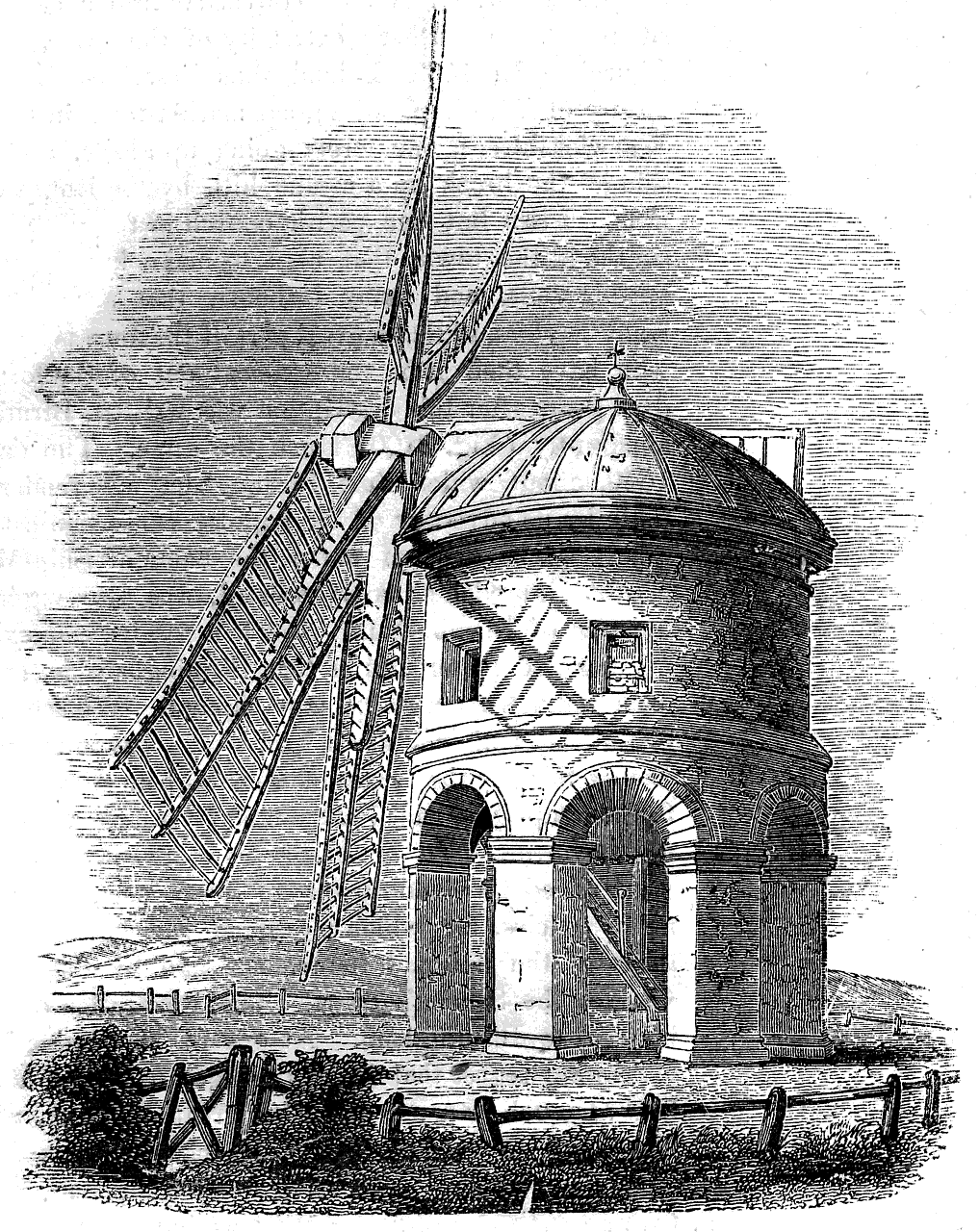
Nothing in early Norse architecture is similar to the Newport Tower in size or appearance. However, this 17th-century windmill near Chesterton, England shares many characteristics with the Newport Tower.

The tower is described in a document of 1741 as "the old stone mill." It was used as a haymow in 1760, while it was described in 1767 as being used as a powder store "some time past". De Barres's plan of Newport published in 1776 marks it as "Stone Wind Mill." During the American Revolution, the tower was used by the Americans as a lookout and by the British to store munitions.

== Construction ==
The tower is located at the upper end of the plot behind the now-demolished mansion built by Benedict Arnold, the first colonial governor of Rhode Island who moved from Pawtuxet to Newport in 1651. In 1677, Arnold mentions "my stone built Wind Mill" in his will; the site for his burying ground is between this mill and his mansion and still exists today. The reference has generally been accepted as referring to the Newport Tower, and it is evidence that the tower was once used as a windmill. However, others have contested that locals remembered the tower functioning as a corn mill, and that it couldn't have been built as a windmill because it had a ground-level fireplace.

An illustration from the British "Penny Magazine" published in 1836 (shown at right) reveals that the tower is of a similar type to Chesterton Windmill, a 17th-century mill near Chesterton, Warwickshire, England.

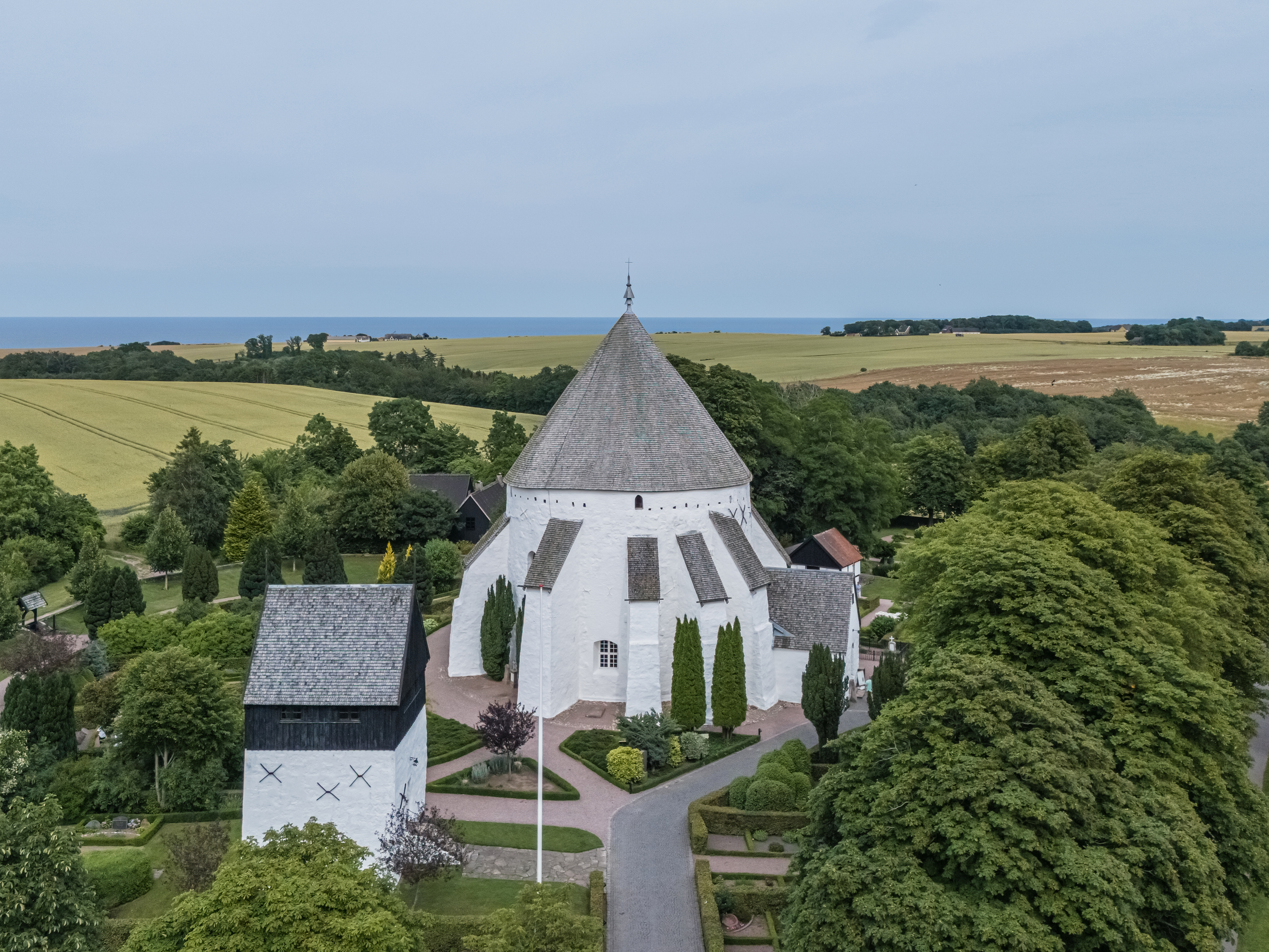
Østerlars Church, Bornholm

Various authors have suggested that comparable mediaeval buildings can be found in Europe, particularly the Orphir Round Church on Orkney built in Scotland around 1115, and the round churches on the Danish island of Bornholm, such as Østerlars Church dating from around 1160.

== Scientific investigations ==
=== 1848 mortar comparison ===
In 1848, the Rev. Dr. Jackson of Newport collected samples of mortar from the mill and some of the oldest known structures in the town, including the very early Bull house (c. 1640), the Easton house (1642–1643), other houses, and the tombs of Governor Arnold and his wife. Under detailed examination, all proved to be of very similar composition, "composed of shell lime, sand, and gravel".

There is no evidence for Godfrey's assertion that Arnold "built his house" in Newport. From Godfrey's thesis: "It is strongly suggested by the records that he purchased some of his Newport property, specifically the section on which he later built his house and the Stone Mill, the year before he moved. (Thompkins, 1919, quoting Roger Williams, 1650) The original owner had been Jeremy Clarke, but there is no indication that Clarke ever built on the property."

Thompkins wrote: “It will be noticed as an evidence of Benedict Arnold's prominence that his name is mentioned first in the order, rather than his father, and as an indication of his increasing wealth at the assessment of taxes in Providence in 1650, Benedict Arnold's amount was put at £5, the largest sum assessed against any one individual. In June of this same year Roger Williams, in writing to Gov. Winthrop of Connecticut says, "Benedict Arnold having now bought house and land at Newport, proposing thither to remove."

=== 1948 excavation ===
The city of Newport gave permission for a scientific investigation of the site by the Society for American Archaeology in 1948. The investigation was directed by Hugh Henken of Harvard University, with the field work headed by William S. Godfrey. As part of the investigation, a one-meter-wide trench was dug from the tower's exterior through the interior. The results were published in Godfrey's 1951 Ph.D. dissertation and concluded that all the artifacts discovered were from the 17th century. Godfrey's dissertation identifies Benedict Arnold as the builder of the tower, stating that Arnold "purchased some of his Newport property, specifically the section on which he later built his house and the stone mill, the year before he moved.... At some period before 1677 Arnold built the Old Stone Mill."

Godfrey initially dismissed the Chesterton Mill theory, claiming that "on the other hand, there is very little probability that Benedict built his Tower as a mill... the tower mill form, as contrasted to the smock, post and composite forms, was not common in England until the beginning of the 18th century." Godfrey posited the hypothesis that "the tower was built as a comfortable retreat and lookout for a very rich and very autocratic old man." However, he later retreated from this position, noting in 1954 that "Rex Wailes, noted English expert on windmills... has supported the contention that both structures were built as mills." It has since been shown that tower mills were known in England from the late 13th century and that they became increasingly common from the late 16th century onwards. Subsequent research has determined that Chesterton was, in fact, built as a windmill in 1632–33, as the original building accounts have been traced since Wailes's death in 1986, including payments for sailcloths. There are also several surviving 17th-century unarched stone tower mills in North America, which are similar in appearance to European examples of the same period (e.g., Moulin de Grondines, Quebec (1674) and Moulin de Vincelotte, Quebec (1690)).

=== 1993 carbon-14 dating ===
In 1993, a team of researchers from Denmark and Finland conducted radiocarbon dating tests of the tower's mortar. The results suggest that the mortar was made between 1635 and 1698. The tested mortar may date from the tower's initial construction or from repointing, which may have been performed long after initial construction. The researchers drilled "deep so as to get past any recent mortar that might have been applied during tuck pointing."In a 2003 report on this and related work, Hale and others put the date of the mortar at about 1680.

== Alternative hypotheses ==
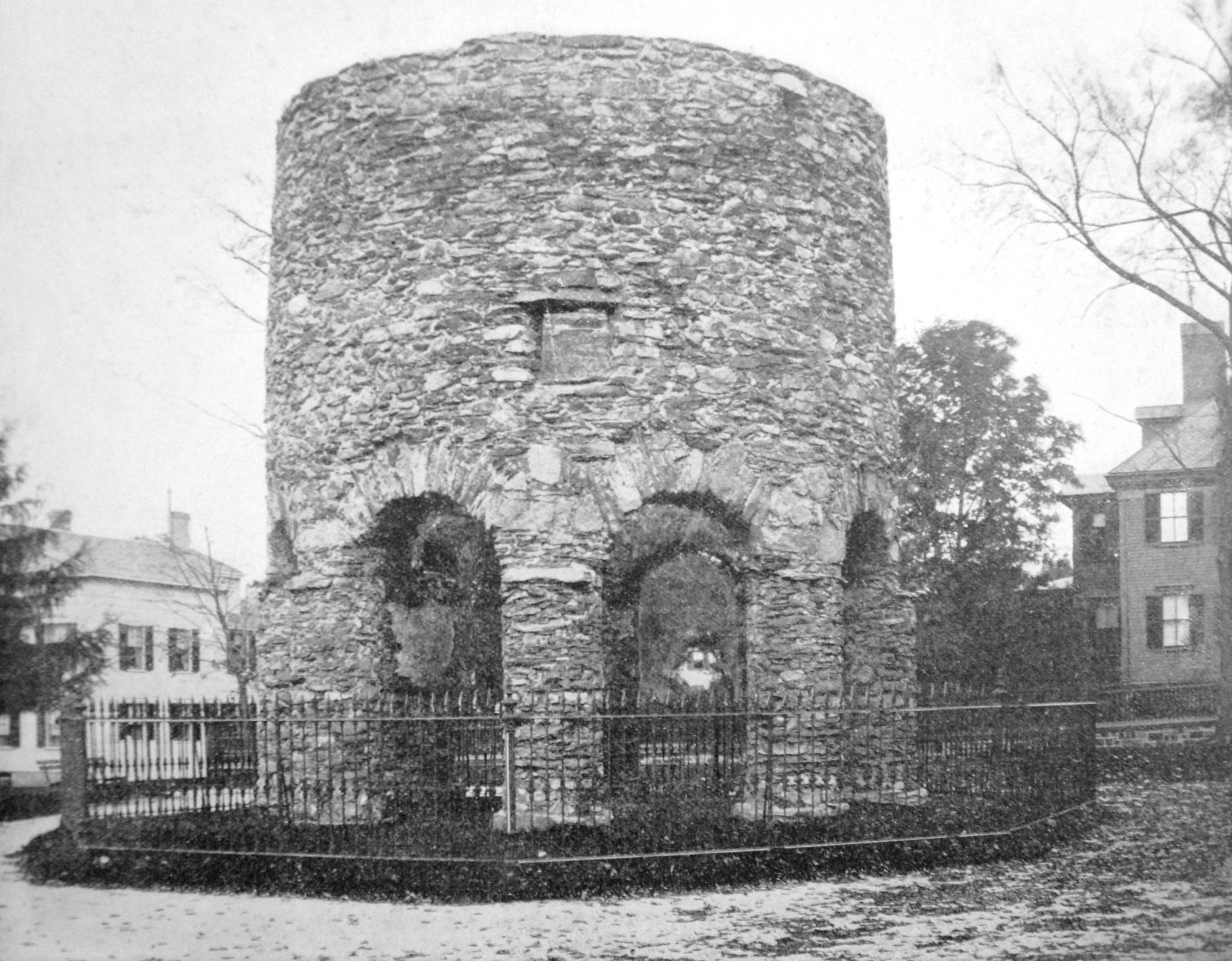
c.1894

=== Norse ===
In 1837, Danish archaeologist Carl Christian Rafn proposed a Viking origin for the tower in his book Antiquitates Americanæ, partly based on his research of the inscriptions on the Dighton Rock near the mouth of the Taunton River. This hypothesis is predicated on the uncertainty of the southward extent of the early Norse explorations of North America, particularly in regard to the actual location of Vinland. Rafn's popularization of the theory led to a flurry of interest and alleged proofs of Norse settlement in the area. Henry Wadsworth Longfellow incorporated the Norse-origin view of the tower in his poem "The Skeleton in Armor". Philip Ainsworth Means was an archaeologist whose specialty was Andean civilizations, and he attempted to compile all known evidence surrounding the tower in his 1942 book Newport Tower. As a supporter of the Norse hypothesis, Means dismissed the idea that Benedict Arnold built the tower "from the ground up." He claimed that the Tower was a church built between the 11th and 14th centuries, citing many architectural features obsolete by the 17th century.

Much of Means's evidence has been shown to be mistaken. His assertion is incorrect that a windmill would not have fireplaces because of the fire risk. Several have fireplaces aligned with windows, and it is not unusual to find a double flue exiting the wall, generally with the exits aligned parallel to the prevailing wind to improve the updraft on a relatively short flue.

Examples include the 1750s Upholland Windmill in Lancashire, where the fireplace is at second floor level, as well as Much Wenlock windmill, Shropshire, which has double flues of uncertain purpose rising from the middle floor level, which was constructed in the 18th century.

=== Observatory hypothesis ===
Four of the eight supporting pillars of the tower face the main points of the compass. William Penhallow was a Professor of Physics and an astronomer at the University of Rhode Island who studied the windows in the tower and found a number of astronomical alignments. At the summer solstice, the setting sun should shine through the west window (actually just south of true west) onto a niche in the inner wall, next to the south window. Similarly, the angle from the east window through the west window is about 18 degrees south of west, which is the southern extreme of moonsets during what is known as the "lunar minor standstill". The smaller windows also form alignments on significant stars. These alignments could be accidental, but if they were deliberate it would explain why the pattern of windows seems "so odd", according to Penhallow.

=== Chinese ===
Author Gavin Menzies argues in his book 1421: The Year China Discovered America that the tower was built by a colony of Chinese sailors and concubines from the junks of Zheng He's voyages, either as a lighthouse or as an observatory to determine the longitude of the colony. Menzies claimed that the tower closely matches designs used in Chinese observatories and lighthouses elsewhere. However, Menzies’s claims have been overwhelmingly rejected by scientists and scholars.

=== Portuguese ===
During the early 20th century, Edmund B. Delabarre associated the Dighton Rock with the lost Portuguese navigators Miguel Corte-Real and his brother Gaspar. This Portuguese hypothesis has been supported more recently by Manuel Luciano DaSilva, who suggests that one of the Corte-Real brothers built the Newport Tower as a watchtower. The idea of Portuguese construction of the tower was also supported by former U.S. Ambassador Herbert Pell, who in 1948 argued that the tower resembles elements of the Convent of Tomar in Portugal.

=== Medieval Templars ===
British writer Andrew Sinclair has put forth the hypothesis that the Newport Tower was built by medieval Scottish Templars led by Scottish earl Henry Sinclair as part of an alleged voyage to New England about a hundred years before Columbus, but such a voyage has been vigorously disputed.

== In literature ==
Lydia Sigourney's poem "The Newport Tower" was published in her Scenes in my Native Land, 1845. The accompanying text covers some of the arguments as to its origins outlined above.

== See also ==
- Oldest buildings in the United States
- List of windmills in Rhode Island
- Albinus Hasselgren
- Stafford Hill Memorial, a replica of the tower in Cheshire, Massachusetts
