= Hasselgren =

Hasselgren is a Swedish surname. Notable people with the surname include:

- Albinus Hasselgren (1880–1916) (born Johan Albin Hasselgren), Swedish-born American artist
- Ragnar Hasselgren (1904–1982), Swedish-born American singer and recording artist
