= Stafford Hill Memorial =

- U.S. National Register of Historic Places
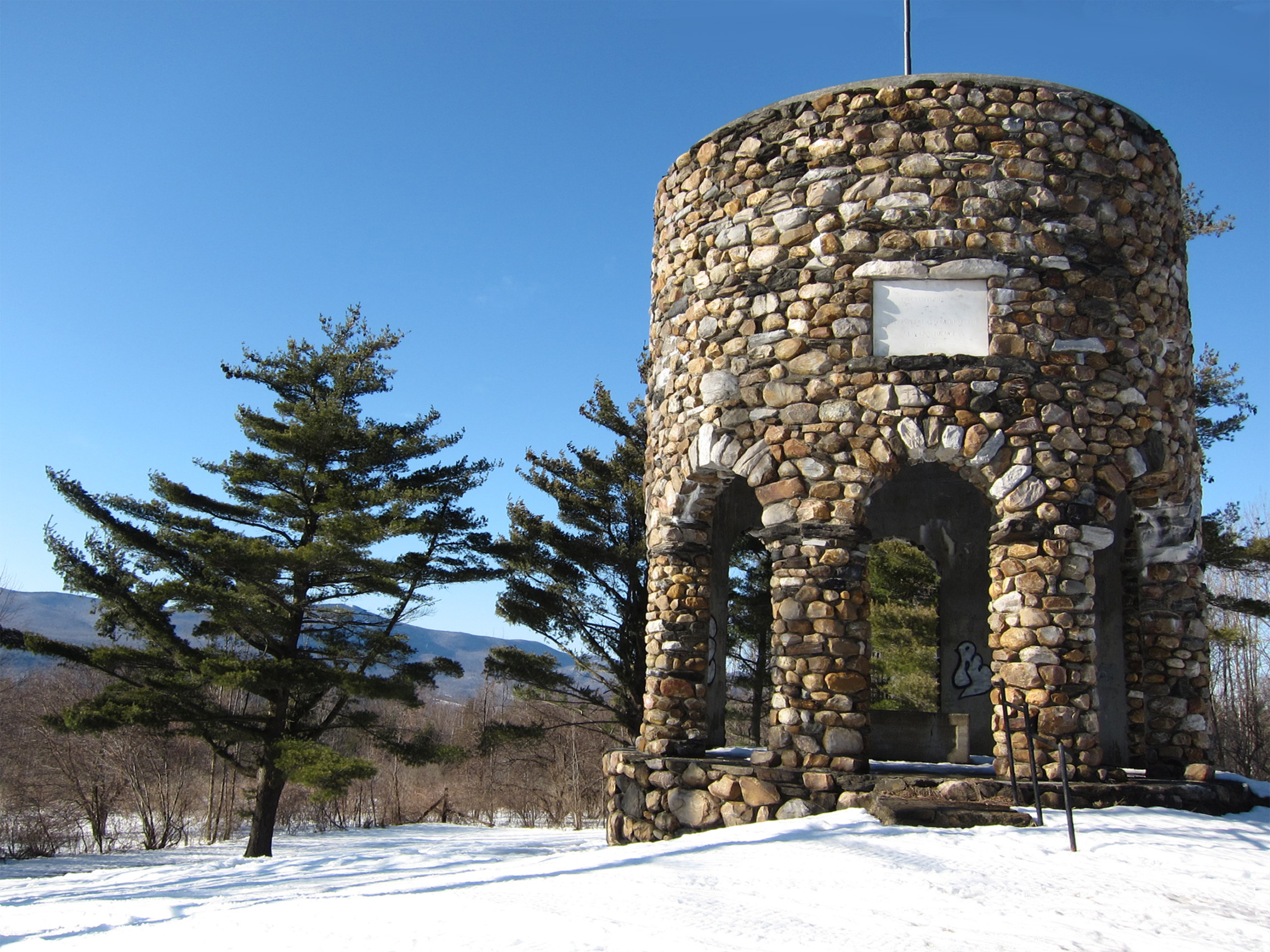

- Location within Massachusetts Location within the United States
- Location: Stafford Hill Rd., Cheshire, Massachusetts
- Coordinates: 42°34′28″N 73°6′59″W
- Area: 1.3 acres (0.53 ha)
- Built: 1927
- Architect: Eugene B. Bowern, Newton C. Bond
- NRHP reference No.: 86000260
- Added to NRHP: February 14, 1986

The Stafford Hill Memorial is a stone memorial on Stafford Hill Road in Cheshire, Massachusetts. The memorial was built in 1927 to commemorate the grave site of Joab (also spelled Jorab) Stafford, who settled in what is now Cheshire in 1767. The stone structure was designed as a replica of a stone tower in Rhode Island, where Stafford came from. The memorial was listed on the National Register of Historic Places in 1986.

== Description and history ==
The Stafford Hill Memorial stands in a rural setting, set back over 400 feet (120 m) from Stafford Hill Road in northeastern Cheshire. It is located near the crest of the Stafford Hill ridge, where there are dramatic views of the surrounding countryside. The memorial is a rubblestone structure, 25 feet (7.6 m) in diameter and in height. It is capped by a flat roof on which a flagpole is mounted. The lower level of the memorial consists of eight arches, with a mausoleum containing the remains of Joab Stafford in the center. The interior is finished in concrete. Above the south arch a marble plaque is set in the stone; it bears the legend "1777, Erected in Memory of the Pioneers and Patriots of New Providence, 1927."

Joab Stafford was a native of Newport, Rhode Island, who was sent to the area to survey the land that was then known as New Providence, but later incorporated as Cheshire. Stafford surveyed the land in 1766, and purchased three lots the following year. He built his house on this property (then 200 acres (81 ha)), and it became the early center of the community. None of the buildings from his occupancy survive.

Stafford formed a militia company that fought in the Battle of Bennington in August 1777. Stafford later moved to Albany, New York but returned to Cheshire in 1800 and died there in 1802. In 1927, the local Sons of the American Revolution raised funds by subscription to construct a memorial to Stafford. The memorial tower was constructed of fieldstone in that year, and Stafford's remains were reinterred in a mausoleum . The memorial incorporates Stafford's grave site, the tower, and a variety of commemorative plaques. In the years since, some of the plaques have been stolen, and others have been removed to Cheshire Town Hall for safekeeping. The memorial and its surrounding land are owned and maintained by the town.

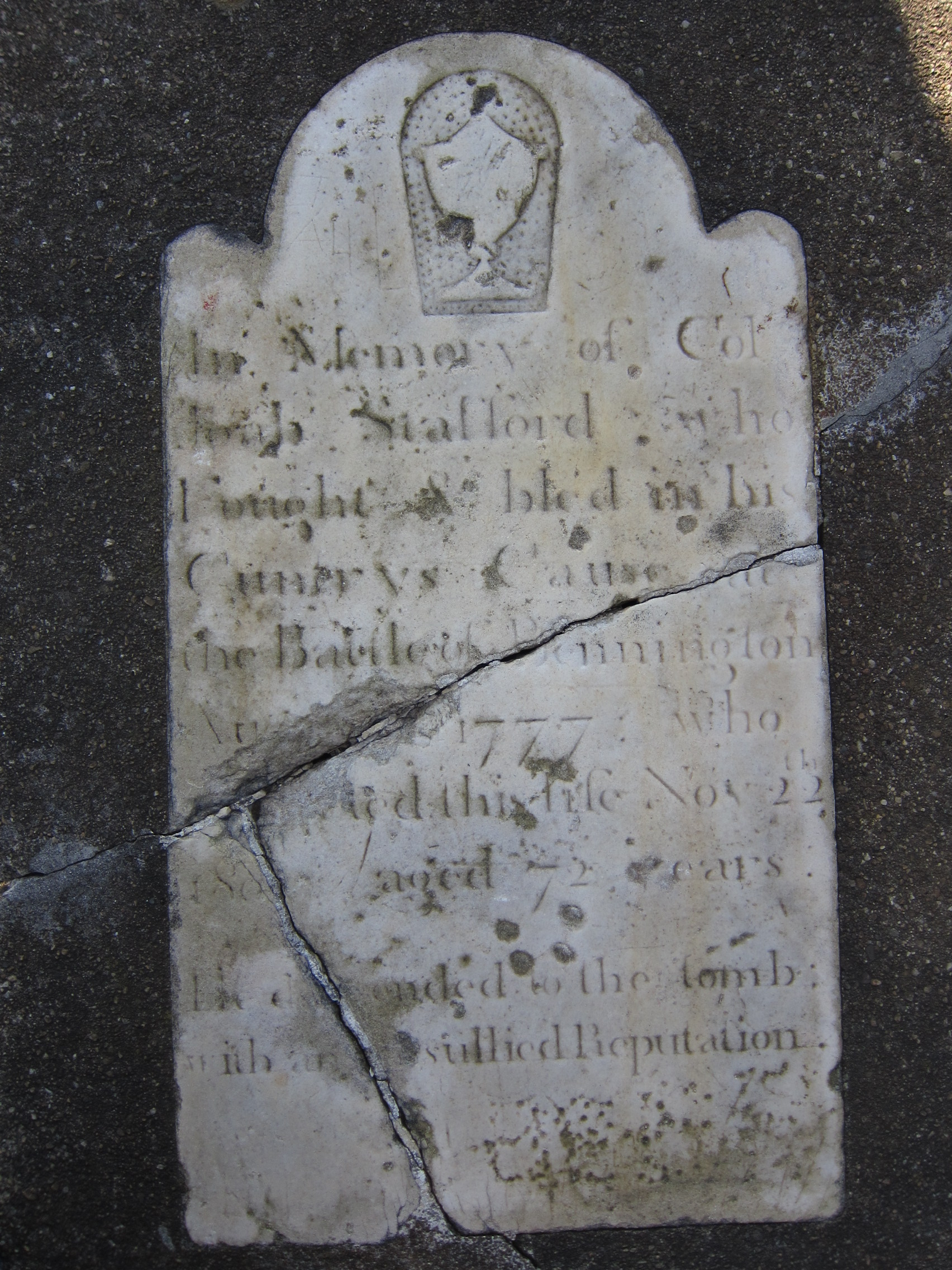
Tomb Stone on Sarcophagus of Col. Jorab Stafford

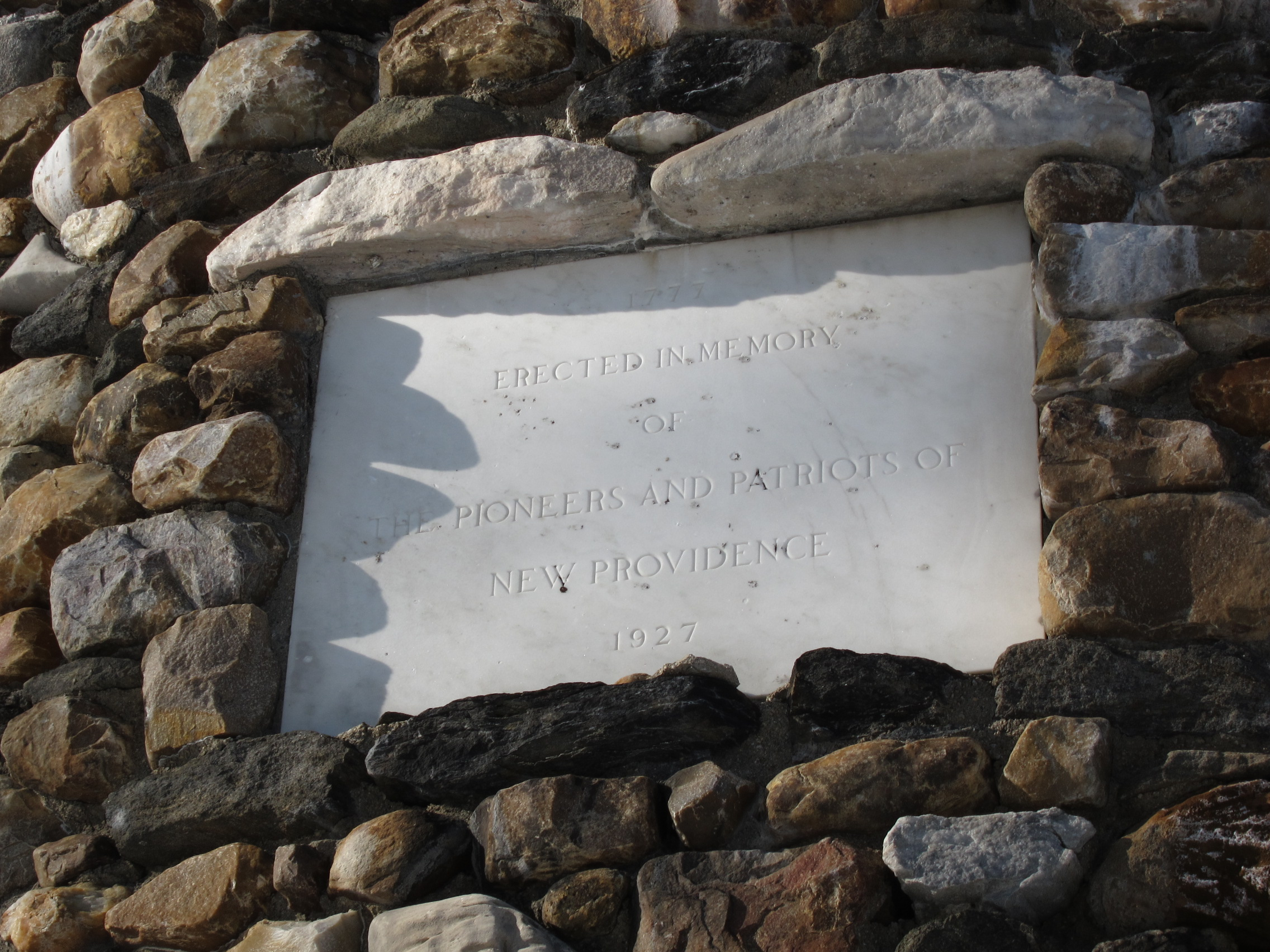
Limestone Plaque in Tower Wall

== See also ==
- National Register of Historic Places listings in Berkshire County, Massachusetts
