= The Skeleton in Armor =

Skeleton unearthed in Fall River, Massachusetts in 1832

The Skeleton in Armor is the name given to a skeleton associated with metal, bark and cloth artifacts which was unearthed in Fall River, Massachusetts in 1832. The skeleton was subsequently destroyed in a fire in 1843. It is also the name of a poem by Henry Wadsworth Longfellow.

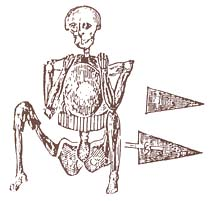
sketch of The Skeleton in Armor

== Discovery and description ==
A contemporary account of the skeleton's discovery and general appearance was written by a Dr. Phineas W. Leland in 1843, soon after the artifact's destruction. The text of the description was as follows:

Among the curiosities of peculiar interest (in the cabinets of the Fall River Athenaeum) was the entire skeleton of a man, about which antiquarians in the old as well as the new world had speculated much. The skeleton was found in the year 1832 in a sand- or grave-bank a little east of the Unitarian meetinghouse by some persons while digging away and removing a portion of the bank. (On or very near the site now occupied by the "Gas-Works", corner of Hartwell and Fifth Streets). The skeleton was found near the surface in a sitting posture, the legbones doubled upon the thigh-bones, and the thighs brought up nearly parallel with the body. It was quite perfect, and stood remarkably well the test of exposure. Covering the sternum was a triangular plate of brass somewhat corroded by time, and around the body was a broad belt made of small brass tubes four or five inches in length about the size of a pipestem placed parallel and close to each other. Arrowheads made of copper or brass were also found in the grave with the skeleton. That these were the remains of an Indian seemed to be very generally conceded; the configuration of the skull, the position in which the skeleton was found, and the additional fact that parts of other skeletons were found near the same place renders it nearly certain that these were the bones of an Indian.

Another description of the artifact written by John Stark, a lawyer in Galena, Illinois, appeared in the 1837 volume of the American Magazine of Useful and Entertaining Knowledge:

Stark argues that the construction of the arrows showed they were not made by Indians and compared the bracelets and anklets with some found at the Mayan site of Palenque which he ascribed to an Asiatic race.

But we rather incline to the belief that the remains found at Fall River belonged to the crew of a Phoenician vessel. The spot where they were found is on the sea-coast, and in the immediate neighborhood of Dighton Rock, famed for its hieroglyphic inscriptions, of which no sufficient explanation has yet been given, alla near which rock brazen vessels have been found. If this latter hypothesis be adopted, a part of it is that these mariners, the unwilling and unfortunate discoverers of a new world, lived some time after they landed, and having written their names, perhaps their epitaphs, upon the rock at Dighton, died, and were buried by the natives.

== Loss ==
The skeleton was moved to the Fall River Athenaeum, a library, where it was displayed in a glass-covered case, along with the arrow tips. The Athenaeum, along with much of the village of Fall River, was destroyed in the "Great Fire" of July 2, 1843.

== Identity ==
=== Native American ===
As stated in the Leland article cited above, the majority opinion of the find at the time was that it represented a Native American chief. Given Fall River's location, this could have been a member of the Narragansett or Wampanoag tribe.

Besides the other brass arrowheads mentioned above, at least one identical breastplate has been found, and it is known that traders sold the Indians brass kettles from which they made arrowheads. Arrowheads described as "precisely similar" were used by the Iroquois in the 17th century.

=== Early colonist or explorer ===
Because the artifact has been destroyed, there is no way of scientifically dating the remains. Although the style of armor described as being found with the skeleton certainly does not sound similar to anything worn by early European colonists who settled the area, the possibility that the skeleton belonged to some early settler cannot be entirely discounted.

== Longfellow's poem ==
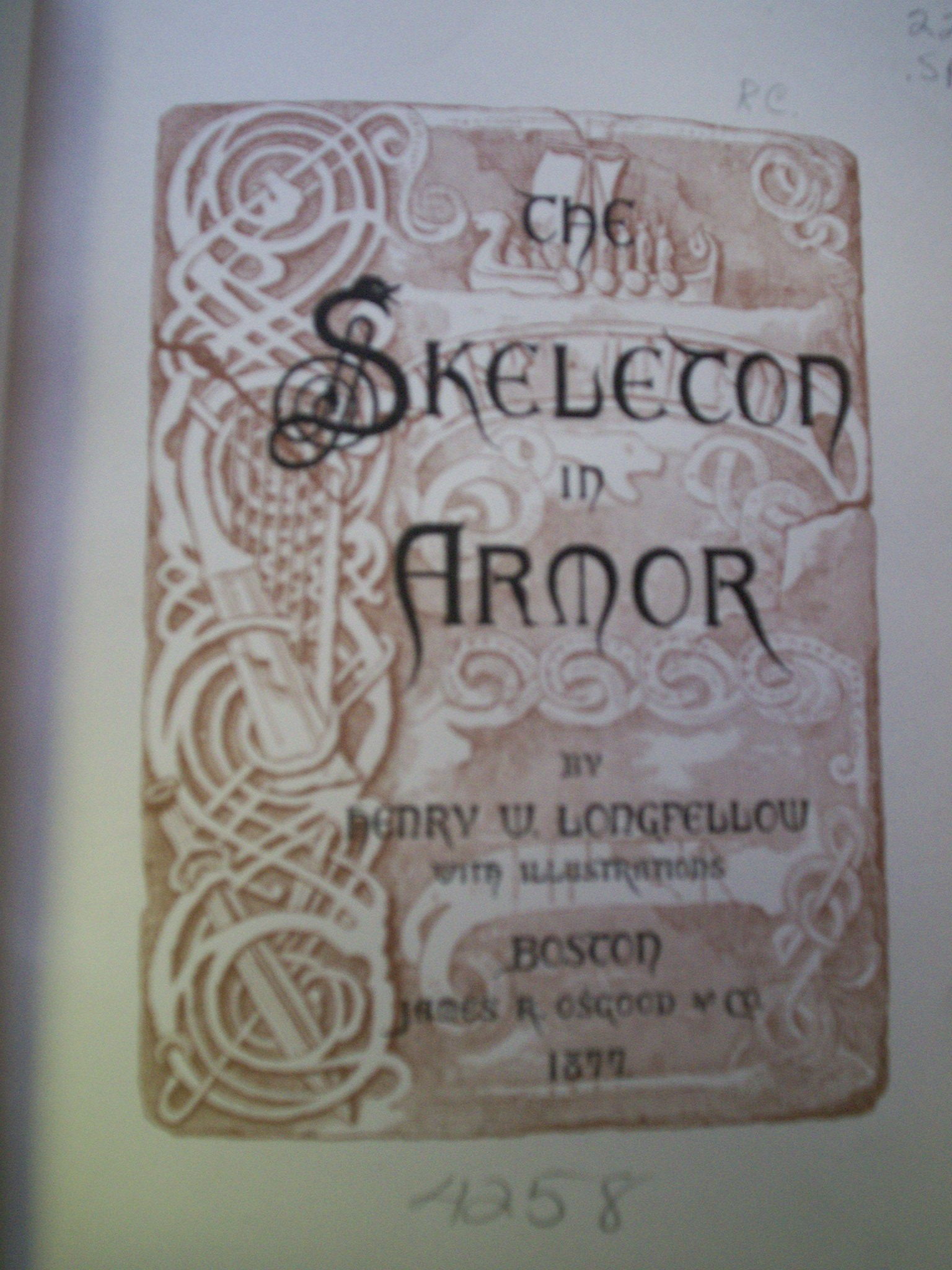
Cover page for an 1877 edition of Longfellow's "Skeleton in Armor"

Henry Wadsworth Longfellow was evidently familiar with the artifact's discovery. Unlike the authors of the articles reproduced above, Longfellow apparently considered that the artifact was Norse in origin; Longfellow was familiar with the writings of Carl Christian Rafn on the subject of Norse colonization of the Americas. Whether or not Longfellow concluded that this was a genuine Norse artifact is unknown. Nevertheless, he did immortalize the discovery in the poem "The Skeleton in Armor". The poem was first published in Lewis Gaylord Clark's The Knickerbocker in 1841. In the poem, Longfellow also refers to the Old Stone Mill in Touro Park in Newport, Rhode Island, also known as the Newport Tower. Some suggest that the stone structure dates back to the Viking exploration of North America, though it is more likely it was built in the seventeenth century during the time of Governor Benedict Arnold.

== Commemoration ==
In 1903, Fall River placed a bronze tablet on a brick building on Hartwell and Fifth Street to commemorate the finding of the skeleton at that location.

The tablet was 24x20 inches and read: "A Skeleton In Armor was found near this spot by Hannah Borden Cook In the month of May A D 1831 This Tablet was placed here by the Women's Educational and Industrial Society of Fall River Mass May 27th A D 1903".

The tablet was stolen in 2018 by metal thieves but was recovered and repositioned in a more secure spot.
