= List of windmills in Rhode Island =

This is a list of traditional windmills in the American state of Rhode Island.

See all having coordinates in "Map all coordinates using OpenSourceMap" at right.

== Locations ==
Known building dates are in bold text. Non-bold text denotes first known date. Iron windpumps are outside the scope of this list unless listed on the National Register of Historic Places.

Windmill	Location	Type	Built	Notes	Photograph
Harbor Mill	Block Island	Smock	c. 1810	Blown down 1938	
Littlefield Mill	Block Island		1877	Standing 1900	
	Bristol	Smock	**1797**	Moved to Fairhaven, Massachusetts 1821.	
	Bristol	Smock	Mid-18th century	Moved to Fall River, Massachusetts	
William Boyd's Mill	Bristol			Blown down 1815.	
East Street	East Greenwich	Smock	c. 1790	Moved within East Greenwich 1874	
**East Greenwich Mill**	East Greenwich; 41°39′49″N 71°27′23″W	Smock	**1874**		
**Jamestown Mill**	Jamestown; 41°30′59″N 71°22′28″W	Smock	**1787**		
(1st mill)	Little Compton				
(2nd mill)	Little Compton				
**Boyd's Mill**	Middletown; 41°30′03″N 71°16′09″W	Smock	**1810**/**2001**		
**Prescott Farm Mill**	Middletown	Smock	**1970**		
Chase Mill	Middletown	Smock	1797	Moved within Middletown c. 1855.	
Chase Mill	Middletown	Smock	c. 1855	Moved to South Dartmouth, Massachusetts 1924.	
Harkness Mill	Middletown	Smock	1845	Burnt down November 1905.	
Boothden Mill	Middletown	Smock	**1883**	Burnt down early 20th century	
**Newport Tower**	Newport; 41°29′08″N 71°18′35″W	Tower	c. 1677		
Windmill	Newport	Smock		Moved to Middletown (Chase Mill) at unknown date.	
Windmill	Newport		**1663**	Blown down 1675	
Quaker Hill Mill	Portsmouth	Smock		Moved within Portsmouth c. 1876	
Lehigh Hill Mill	Portsmouth	Smock	c. 1876	Moved to Middletown 1970	
John Peterson's Mill	Portsmouth	Smock	**1810**	Dismantled 1995, rebuilt at Middletown 2001.	
Windmill	Tiverton	Smock		Moved to Newport at unknown date.	
Windmill	Warren	Smock	**1812**	Moved to Fall River, Massachusetts at unknown date	
Windmill	unknown location	Smock	1770s	Moved to Block Island c. 1810.	

== See also ==
- Wind power in Rhode Island

== Sources ==
- Lombardo, Donald (2003). Windmills of New England, Their Genius, Madness, History & Future. Cape Cod, MA: On Cape Publications. ISBN 0-9719547-7-1.
