= Wind power in Rhode Island =

Electricity from wind in one U.S. state

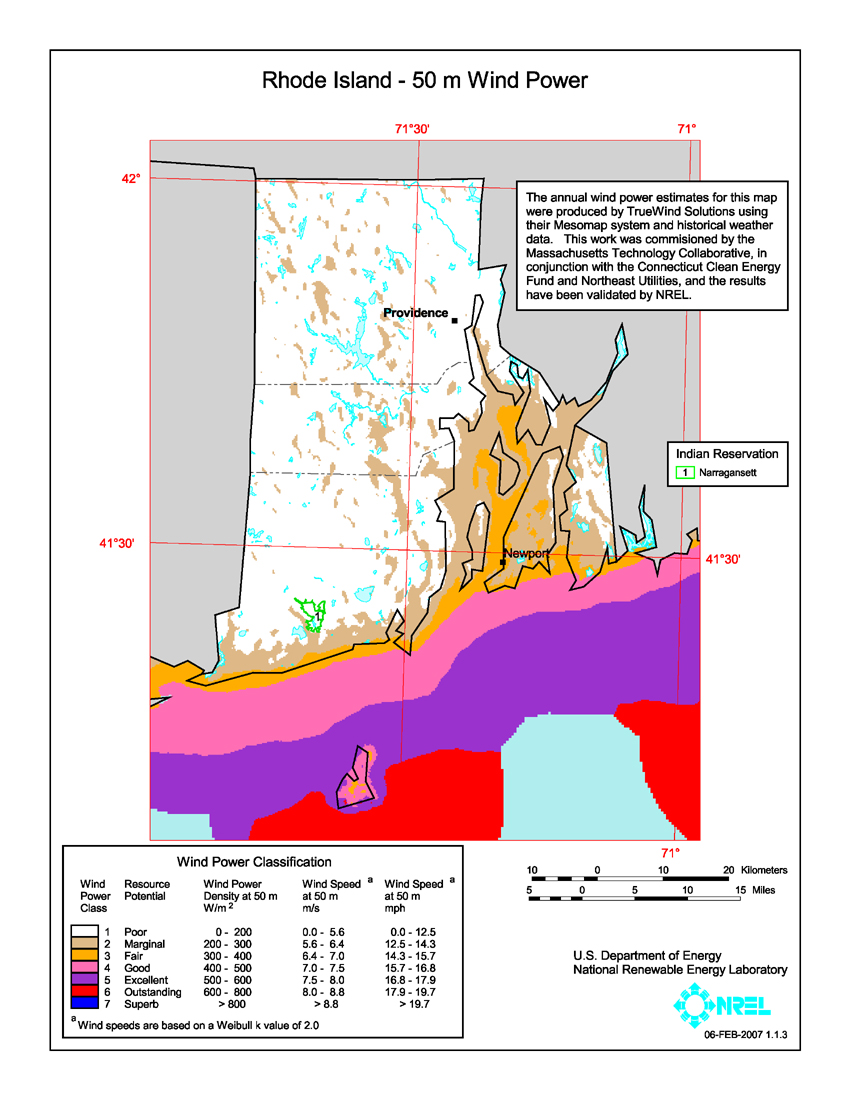
2007 US Department of Energy wind resource map of Rhode Island

Wind power in Rhode Island is in the early stages of development. There are several small-scale wind turbine projects in the state. As of December 2013 there were 11 turbines at 10 sites in the state. In 2014, Rhode Island had 9 MW of installed wind power capacity, which quickly rose to 75 MW in 2019.

Rhode Island’s first commercial turbine was constructed in March 2006 at Portsmouth Abbey on Aquidneck Island. Block Island Wind Farm, the first offshore in the U.S., came on line in 2016.

== Early windmills and NASA experiment ==
There were numerous windmills in Rhode Island. Several of the 18th- and 19th-century windmills are still standing and are often open for public viewing. NASA built an experimental wind turbine on Block Island in 1979.

== Wind farms ==
=== Portsmouth Abbey ===
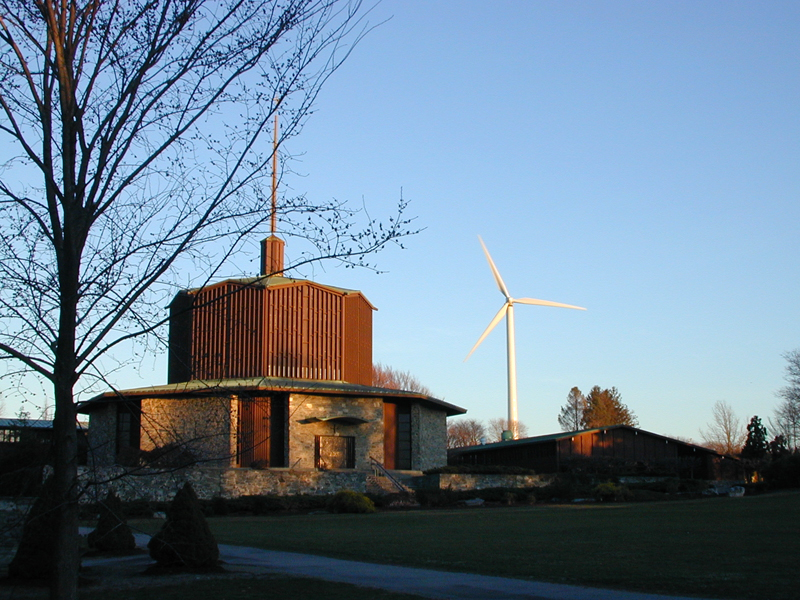
The Portsmouth Abbey turbine in Portsmouth was erected in 2006.

In March 2006 the Portsmouth Abbey School installed a 660-kW V-47 turbine on Aquidneck Island.

=== Portsmouth High School ===
Installed in 2009, the Portsmouth High School turbine was the largest producer of electricity produced by wind power, until faltering in 2012. In 2014, the municipality voted to replace it. The replacement wind turbine came online in 2016. It is 88 meters tall and is rated at 1.5 MW capacity.

=== Fields Point ===
Brought on line in 2012, the three wind turbines at Fields Point in Providence are each rated at 1.5 mW. Manufactured by Goldwind USA, they each have 150 ft (46 m) blades and height of 364 ft (111 m). Together, they supply about 40 to 50 percent of the electricity used by the Narragansett Bay Commission's (NBC) regional waste and storm water treatment facility.

=== North Kingstown ===
A single 413 ft (126 m) turbine in North Kingstown came on line in 2012.

=== Block Island Wind Farm ===
Construction for the Block Island Wind Farm began in 2015. It came online at the end of 2016.

== Statistics ==
Rhode Island wind generation capacity by year
Megawatts of wind capacity

== Proposals ==
=== Coventry ===
Ten 1.5-megawatt turbines in Coventry have been proposed.

=== East Bay Energy Consortium ===
In 2009, the municipalities on the shores of the Easy Bay and Aquidneck & Conanicut Island formed an advisory group that worked through the legislative session of 2012 to build a wind-farm. The group consisted of professionals and community leaders, and sought to determine the viability of a wind-power facility in the hills of Tiverton near RI route 24 and the border with Fall River, Massachusetts. The group generated over two years of wind data from the Tiverton heights. The 10-turbine development project would have provided energy to the East Bay and islands directly via an agreement with National Grid. Legislation to establish a legal entity died in the Rhode Island General Assembly in 2012 over disagreements concerning state powers. Earlier in 2012, Apex Wind Energy competed in courting the City of Tiverton for use of the land, which included a proposed-but-never-built industrial park, and segments of Tiverton Water Department and North Tiverton Fire Department land.

=== Deep Water Wind Energy Center ===
In fall of 2011, Deep Water Wind submitted plans for a massive 200 turbine wind facility 25 miles from shore in federal waters. The facility would provide power to New England and Long Island communities.

== Bans on turbines ==
In 2011, Charlestown became the first municipality in the United States to pass a ban on any size or type of electricity-generating wind turbines. The sweeping prohibition applies to large commercial as well as smaller residential turbines.

== See also ==
- Solar power in Rhode Island
- Cape Wind
- Wind power in the United States
- Renewable energy in the United States
