= Solar power in Rhode Island =

Overview of solar power in the U.S. state of Rhode Island

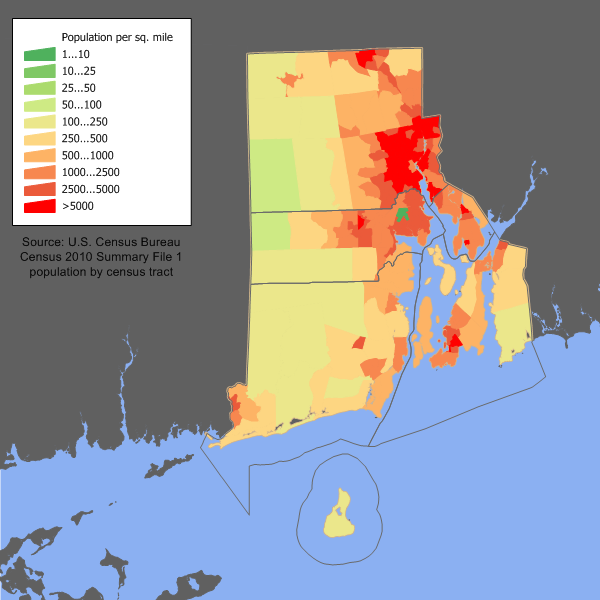
Rhode Island population density

Solar power in Rhode Island has become economical due to new technological improvements and a variety of regulatory actions and financial incentives, particularly a 30% federal tax credit, available through 2016, for any size project. A typical residential installation could pay for itself in utility bill savings in 14 years, and generate a profit for the remainder of its 25 year life. Larger systems, from 10 kW to 5 MW, receive a feed-in tariff of up to 33.45¢/kWh.

Due to the state's small size and comparatively low insolation, solar installations are limited to predominantly rooftop and megawatt scale installations. Approximately 23% of electricity used in Rhode Island could be provided from rooftop solar panels.

== Government policy ==
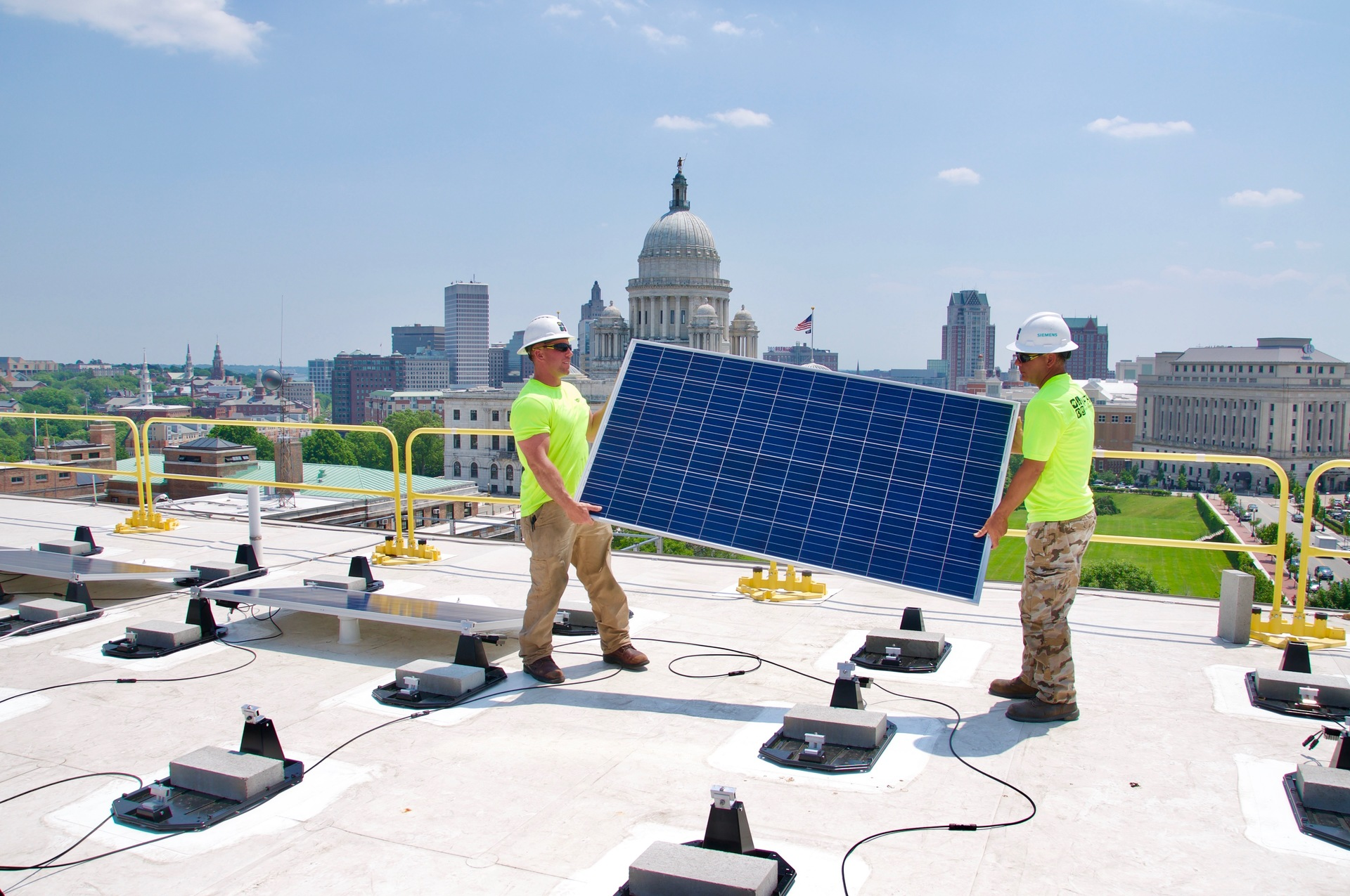
Solar panel installation, Providence

The Government of Rhode Island has taken a variety of actions in order to encourage solar energy use within the state. Nineteen schools have installed 2 kW or larger solar arrays that can be monitored on the Internet, similar to the programs in Australia and New Zealand. A variety of solar arrays have been installed at state facilities, which can also be monitored.

=== Net metering ===
The state has a net metering program that allows installations of up to 5 MW of on-site electrical generation to continuously roll over any excess generation to the next month, or purchased at avoided cost. Participation is limited to 3% of utilities peak demand for Block Island Power Company and Pascoag Utility District. National Grid has no limit. Peak demand for the state for 2011 was 21,477 MW.

=== Renewable portfolio standard ===
The state adopted a Renewable Portfolio Standard (RPS) in 2004 which requires all retail electricity providers, including non-regulated power producers and distribution companies, to "supply 100% of their retail electricity sales from renewable resources by 2033." The Rhode Island Public Utilities Commission engaged InClime, Inc. to administer the Renewable Energy Standard Program.

== Statistics ==
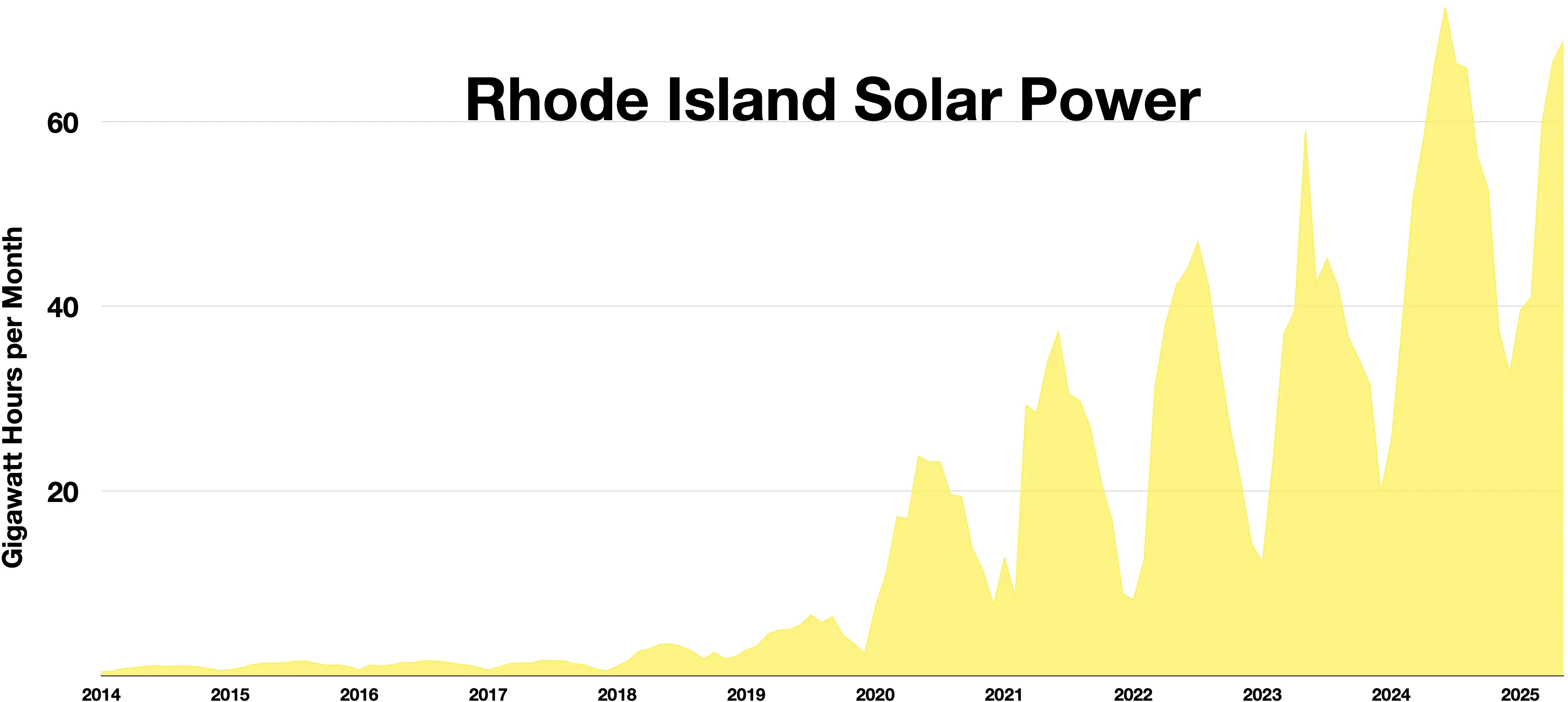
Rhode Island solar power

Photovoltaics (MWp)
Year	Capacity	Change	% Change
2007	0.6		
2008	0.6	0	0%
2009	0.6	0	0%
2010	0.6	0	0%
2011	1.2	0.6	100%
2012	1.9	0.7	58%
2013	7.6	5.7	300%
2014	12.6	5.0	66%
2015	17.1	4.5	36%
2016	22.8	5.7	33%
2017	49.8	27	118%
2018	119.8	70	140%
2019	270.8	151	126%
2020	402.8	132	48%
2021	555.4	152.6	38%
2022	623	67.6	%

Utility-scale solar generation in Rhode Island (GWh)
Year	Total	Jan	Feb	Mar	Apr	May	Jun	Jul	Aug	Sep	Oct	Nov	Dec
2014	10	0	0	1	1	1	1	1	1	1	1	1	1
2015	14	1	1	1	1	1	1	2	2	1	1	1	1
2016	14	1	1	1	1	1	1	2	2	1	1	1	1
2017	15	1	1	1	1	1	2	2	2	1	1	1	1
2018	30	1	2	3	3	3	3	3	3	2	3	2	2
2019	53	3	3	4	5	5	5	7	6	6	4	3	2
2020	194	7	11	17	17	24	23	23	20	19	14	11	8
2021	338	18	18	29	33	37	37	36	34	32	26	22	16

== Notable projects ==
Forbes Street Solar array in East Providence – Phase I is a 3 megawatt array and was switched on in December of 2013, at the time it was one of the largest solar projects in New England. In December of 2018, Phase II went online with an additional 3 megawatts.

Brown University, in partnership with Constellation and Energy Development Partners plan to build a 50 megawatt solar power plant in Kingston Rhode Island on a former gravel pit. The project is estimated to offset approximately 70% of the University's energy consumption and is part of a larger effort to zero out their emissions by 2040.

== See also ==
- Wind power in Rhode Island
- Solar power in the United States
- Renewable energy in the United States
