= Pointe-Claire Windmill =

Montreal windmill built in 1710

- Moulin à vent de Pointe-Claire
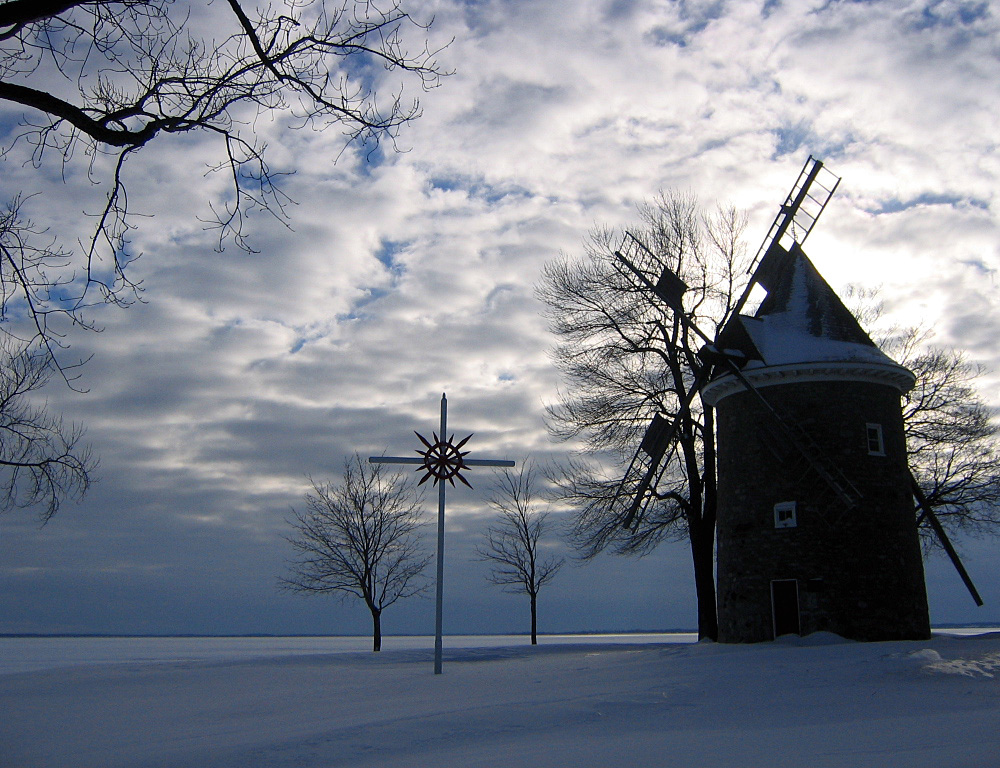
- Pointe-Claire windmill in winter
- Interactive map of Pointe-Claire Windmill
- Location: 1 rue Saint-Joachim, Pointe-Claire
- Coordinates: 45.42511°N 73.8256°W
- Width: 4 metres (13 ft)
- Height: 7.5 metres (25 ft)
- Completion date: 1710

The Pointe-Claire Windmill (French: Moulin à vent de Pointe-Claire) is a windmill in Pointe-Claire, Quebec, Canada. It is the oldest windmill on the island of Montreal and one of 18 remaining windmills in Quebec.

Like most mills in New France it was built to a French design, a cylindrical stone tower with a movable roof which could be turned by a tail pole to face the sails to the wind. The mill had two doors, to provide an exit regardless of which ways the sails faced. The walls are four French feet (1m32) thick at the base. The interior is 12 French feet in diameter by 24 high. The mill originally contained elevated platforms beneath gun slits for defence. The surrounding shoreline was fenced with pointed wooden stakes. However, the site was never attacked.

== Chronology ==
1709: construction began in spring for the Society of Saint-Sulpice by stone mason Jean Mars, and Léonard Paillé dit Paillard and his son Charles for other parts of the construction.
1710: construction complete in the autumn, including a small wooden house for the miller.
1824: major renovation
1837: sold to Amable de Saint-Julien, farmer at Rigaud
1866: sold to the Fabrique de Saint-Joachim-de-la-Pointe-Claire
1866: sold to the Congregation of Notre Dame of Montreal
1885 (approximately): new sails
1954: restoration, conical roof
1967: new sails
1983: classified a monument of Quebec.
2024: the City of Pointe-Claire adopts a by-law to provide financial assistance of $967,761 for renovation of the mill.
