= Chesterton Windmill =

Windmill in Chesterton, Warwickshire, England

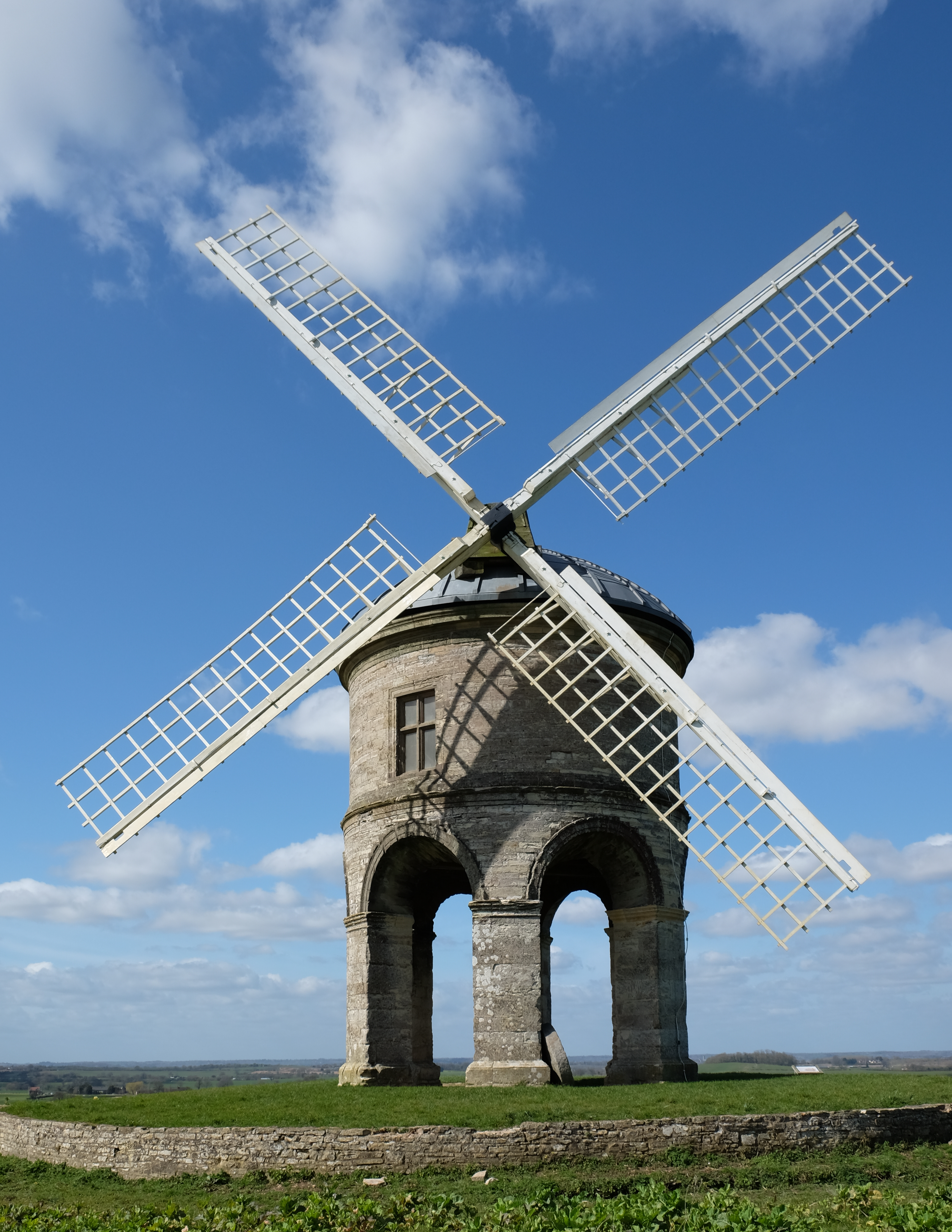
- Chesterton Windmill in Warwickshire
- Interactive map of Chesterton Windmill

Origin
- Mill name: Chesterton Windmill
- Mill location: Chesterton, Warwickshire, England, UK
- Grid reference: SP 347 593
- Coordinates: 52.231°N 1.49°W
- Year built: 1632

Information
- Purpose: Corn mill
- Type: Tower mill
- Storeys: Three storeys (including the open lower storey)
- No. of sails: Four sails
- Type of sails: Common sails
- Windshaft: Cast iron
- Winding: Internal hand winch
- No. of pairs of millstones: Two pairs

Chesterton Windmill

Listed Building – Grade I
- Official name: Chesterton Windmill
- Designated: 7 January 1952
- Reference no.: 1300056

Scheduled monument
- Official name: Chesterton Windmill
- Reference no.: 1005784

Chesterton Windmill is a 17th-century cylindric stone tower windmill with an arched base, located outside the village of Chesterton, Warwickshire. It is a Grade I listed building and a striking landmark in south-east Warwickshire.

== History ==
The windmill is one of Warwickshire's most famous landmarks. It stands on a hilltop overlooking the village of Chesterton, near the Roman Fosse Way and about five miles (8 km) south-east of Warwick. It was built around 1632–1633, probably by Sir Edward Peyto, who was Lord of the Chesterton Manor House. At this time, John Stone, a pupil of Inigo Jones, was in Chesterton designing the new Manor House and he probably helped with the windmill as well. Sir Edward was a mathematician and astrologer and probably his own architect for the windmill, but although claims have been made that the tower was originally built as an observatory, the estate accounts now at Warwick Record Office show that it has always been a windmill, making it the earliest tower mill in England to retain any of its working parts.

== Construction ==
It is built of hard local limestone, with sandstone detailing, on a shallow platform of 71 feet 9 inches (21.87 m) in diameter. The mill tower with a cap height of 36 feet (11 m), unique worldwide in structure and mechanics, is supported on six semicircular arches, on piers, the outer faces of which are arcs of circles radiating from a common centre. A sandstone string course surmounts the six arches and runs round the tower, below the windows. There are four windows in the tower, two small and two much larger with stone mullioned windows. A three-light window set in the roof on the opposite side to the sails, has a small plaque above it with the letters "E. P. 1632".

== Workings ==
Beside the open ground floor within the arches there are two more floors to the mill, the first, lower, or stone floor 15-foot (4.6 m) above ground level, housing millstones, great spur wheel, hurst frame, sack hoist rope passing through the floor trap, and the upper, second, or hoist floor with brake wheel, main gearing (wallower), sack hoist pulley, and parts of the winding winch. The windshaft and the main parts of the winding system including the wind direction indicator is installed within the cap. The space inside the arches, until 1930, used to have a wooden structure to store the grain, and an open timber staircase to reach the milling floors. This structure was removed to prevent vandalism. The cap of the mill is a shallow dome which used to be covered with lead sheet, but also because of vandalism is now covered with aluminium. Between the cap and the top of the wall is a system of rollers running in a track plate allowing the cap to be rotated easily. There is a wind direction indicator on the roof which is continued into the interior, and a small repeat indicator at its lower end, so that the miller could set the mill without leaving his work. The lattice-type-sails are 60 feet (18 m) span counter clock-wise rotation (seen from outside the mill; most of all windmills worldwide rotate clockwise seen from inside the mill - from "under the wind") and with 450 sq ft (42 m^{2}) of canvas. The arched tower covers a very small diameter of 22 feet 9 inches (6.93 m) and it has an "in cap" winding gear unusual for an English windmill, the cap being winded by a hand-operated winch having spur and worm gears.

== Restoration ==
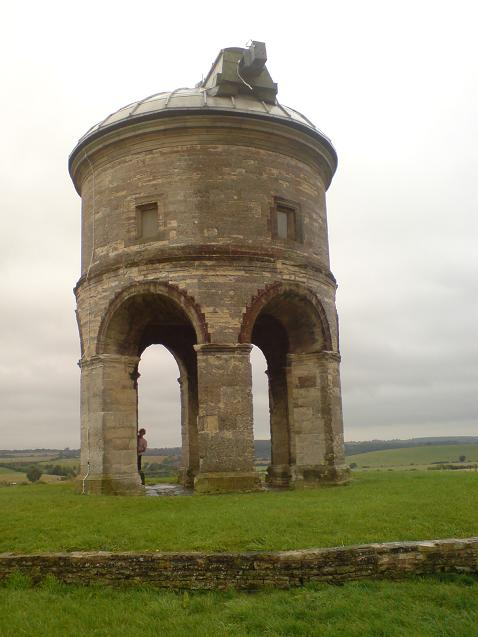
The mill without its sails

The mill has undergone three major reconstructions, one in 1776 when the mill shaft was modified, and the date carved in the tail of the shaft, and one in 1860 when the old curb and cap framing was altered. By 1910, it had ceased to function as a mill because the winding gear failed to operate, so that her last miller, William Haynes, was no longer able to turn the mill's cap round to make the sails face the wind. He abandoned the mill and moved to Harbury tower mill, one mile to the east. In the 1930s, the mill was sometimes used for milling at 'prosperous' winds. Minor repairs to the sails and the wind vane took place. In the early 1950s, one sail broke off and was restored years after. It was not until 1969 that a larger reconstruction of Chesterton Mill began again under the control of Warwickshire County Council, now responsible for its upkeep, and the reconstruction of the machinery. The windmill repairs were finished in 1971, and the mill reopened for a few days to the public each year in summertime (volunteers from nearby villages help run the open days and provide stewards for the event).

In 2006, during an open day, one of the sails fell off the windmill injuring a visitor. Initially, following the incident, the area was roped off to prevent visitors approaching the windmill. The sails themselves were then removed for strengthening. They were replaced in late 2007.

In 1975, it was awarded one of the Civic Trust Heritage Awards.

== Similar structure in Rhode Island, United States ==
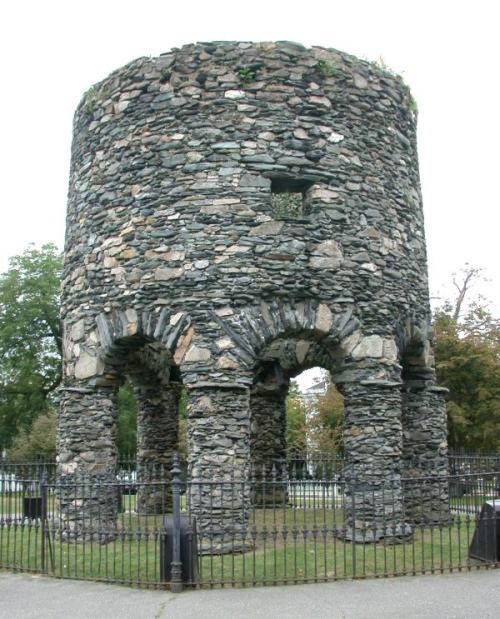
Newport Tower, US in 2004

Newport Tower, a stone tower similar to Chesterton Windmill exists in Newport, Rhode Island, US. The commonly accepted theory is that it was built by Benedict Arnold around 1676 after a previous wooden mill was blown down in 1675. It is not quite the same as Chesterton Windmill, having eight round pillars, but it was very similar. The Arnold family, whose place of origin is disputed but may have been either Leamington or further down the Fosse Way, near Ilchester in Somerset, emigrated to Rhode Island in 1635 where Benedict became governor in 1663. This, together with the documentary evidence for the Tower's use as a mill in Arnold's will and the lack of archaeological evidence for the site having been used before the mid-17th century, has led to the generally accepted theory that the Newport Tower was based on Chesterton Windmill.

== See also ==
- List of windmills in Warwickshire
