= Albinus Hasselgren =

American painter

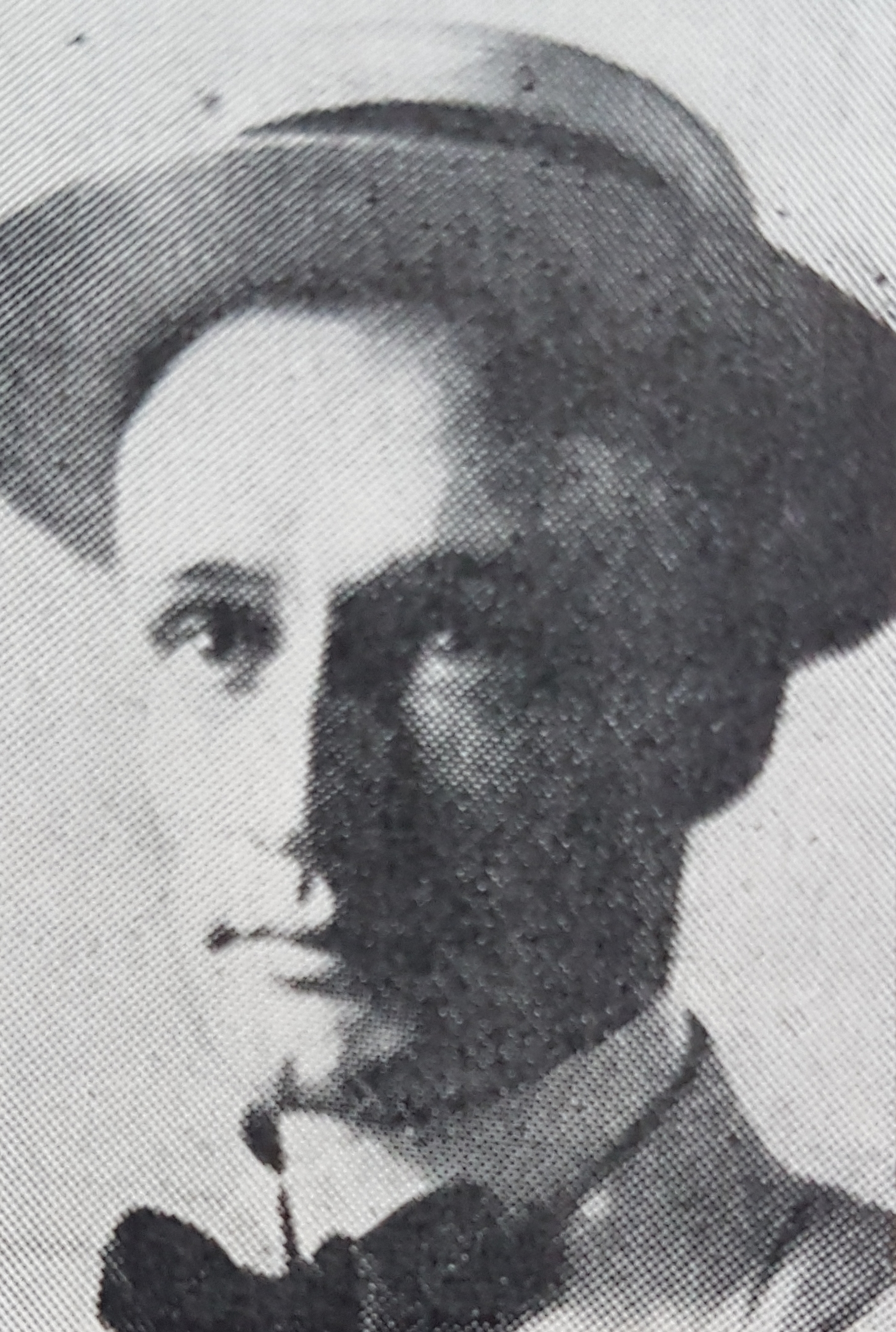
- Albinus Hasselgren, photographed portrait image from Allhems Svenskt konstnärslexikon.
- Born: Johan Albin Hasselgren; March 20, 1880; Gävle, Sweden
- Died: April 9, 1916 (aged 36); Westfield, Massachusetts, U.S.
- Resting place: Swedish Cemetery, Worcester
- Notable work: Vinland the year 1117

Albinus Hasselgren (born Johan Albin Hasselgren, March 20, 1880 – April 9, 1916) was a Swedish-American artist.

== Background ==
Hasselgren was born in Gävle, Sweden. He was the son of Per Johan Hasselgren and Anna Gustafva Jansson. His sister was Swedish artist Elfrida Gustava Ewerlöf (1886-1984).

== Career ==
In 1903, Hasselgren immigrated to the United States where he adopted the first name to Albinus. He painted rural scenes of New England and a number of religious works. Hasselgren also painted altar pieces for Lutheran churches in New England. Two are still in the church of which he became a congregation member, the Emanuel Lutheran.

Soon after his arrival in New England, he became involved in the discussion about early Norse settlements in North America. Hasselgren became convinced that the Newport Tower in Newport, Rhode Island was a remain from such a settlement, something that he developed in his most famous painting Vinland the year 1127. In the painting, we see Vikings together with Native Americans in front of the tower. The painting was featured in the Sunday Telegram and was published in the magazine Prärieblomman Kalender för 1912 .

== Later years and death ==
Hasselgren lived his last four years at a sanatorium in Westfield, Massachusetts, after being diagnosed with tuberculosis. Hasselgren died during 1916 at age 36. He was buried on April 11, 1916, in the Swedish Cemetery (now All Faiths Cemetery) in Worcester (Lot #1359).

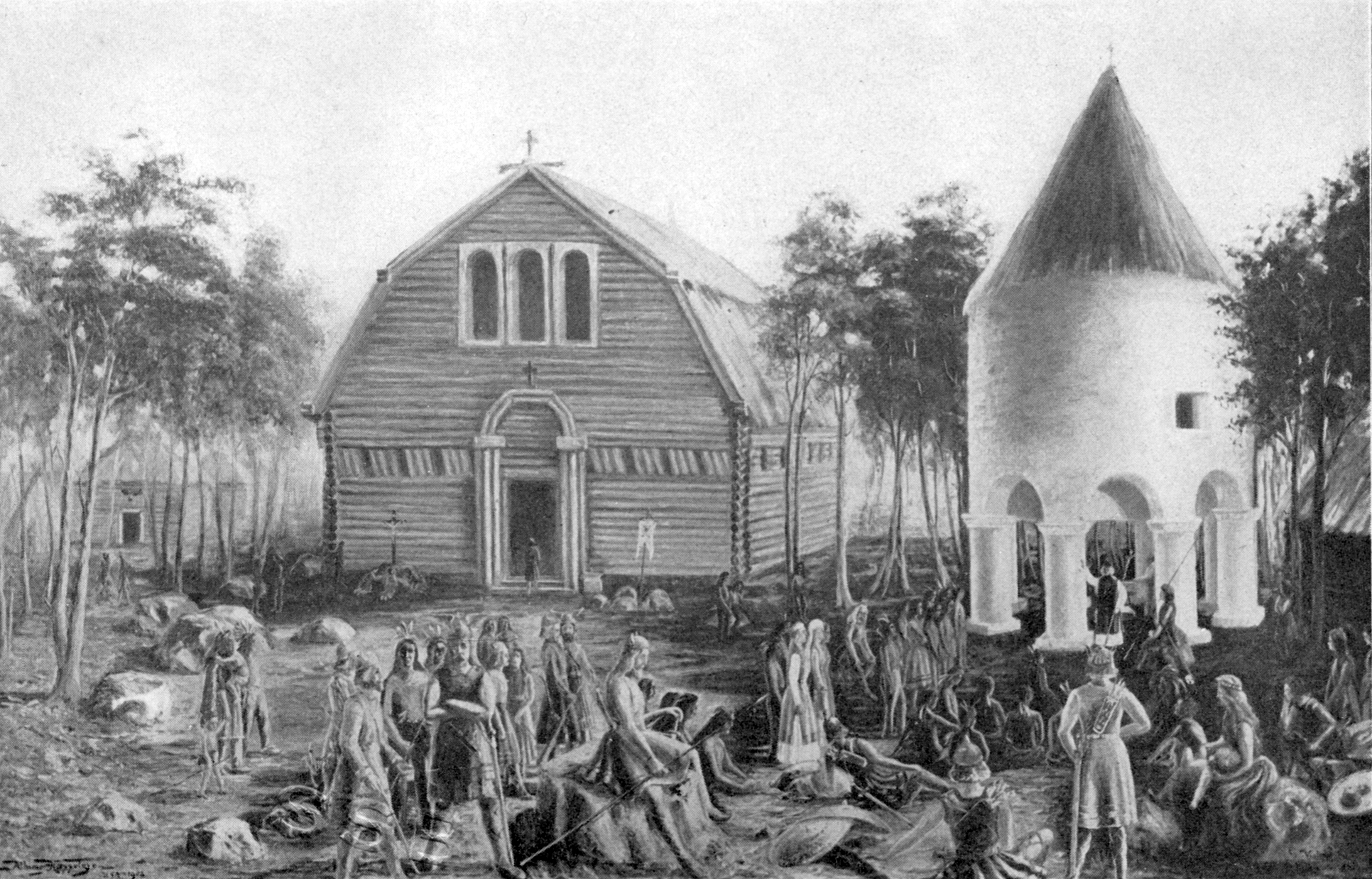
Vinland the year 1127. Published in Prärieblomman Kalender för 1912

== Artworks ==
- Girl On the Beach, oil on canvas, 1904. Private.
- Jesus Preaching to the Multitude, oil on canvas, 1905. Emanuel Lutheran Church, Worcester (Quinsigamond Village).
- The Resurrection, oil on canvas, Emmanual Lutheran Church, Worcester.
- Winter Scene (after Fritz Thaulow), oil on canvas 1907. Private.
- Lake Scene, oil on canvas, 1907. Private.
- Vinland the year 1117, oil on canvas, c. 1908. Whereabouts unknown. Featured in the Sunday Telegram, February 2, 1908. Reproduced in Prärieblomman Kalender för 1912 .

== Other sources ==
- Otto Robert Landelius (1957) "Hasselgren, Johan Albin (Albinus) in Svenskt konstnärslexikon (Malmö: Allhems Förlag) vol. 3 p. 61.
- Jeff Werner (2008) Medelvägens Estetik. Sverigebilder i USA (Möklinta: Gidlunds förlag) vol 2, pp. 28–31.

== Related reading ==
- A sister of Albinus Hasselgren wrote a short biography currently kept at the Emigrant Institute in Växjö, Sweden, together with American newspaper clippings about her brother. There are also postcards and letters from Albinus Hasselgren in the family archive in Bergslagen, Sweden.
