= Chesterton, Warwickshire =

Village in Warwickshire, England

Coordinates: 52.223568°N 1.481728°W

Chesterton
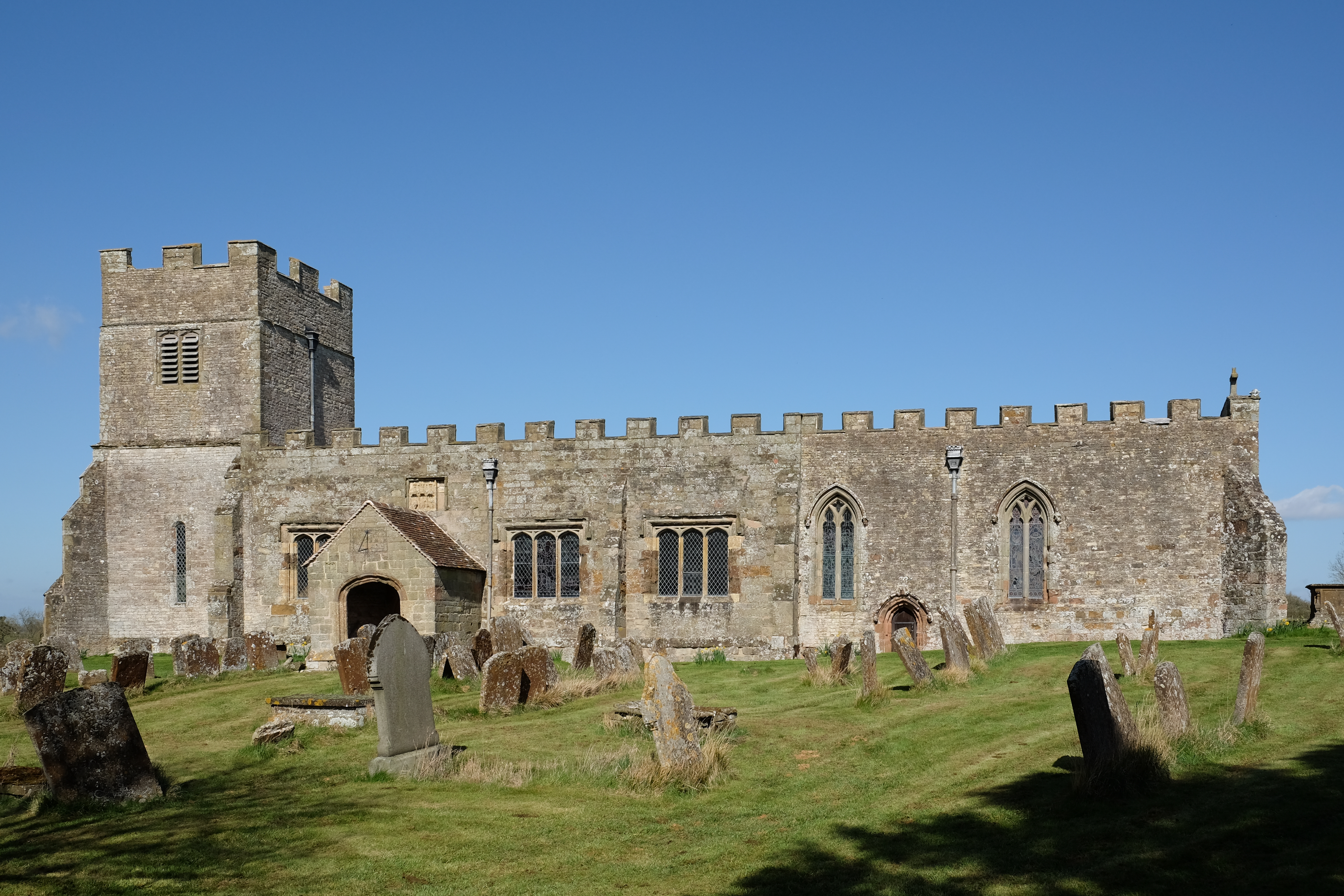
- St Giles Church

- Location within Warwickshire
- Population: 123 (2011)
- OS grid reference: SP348594
- Civil parish: Chesterton and Kingston
- District: Stratford-on-Avon
- Shire county: Warwickshire
- Region: West Midlands
- Country: England
- Sovereign state: United Kingdom
- Post town: Leamington Spa
- Postcode district: CV33
- Dialling code: 01926
- Police: Warwickshire
- Fire: Warwickshire
- Ambulance: West Midlands
- UK Parliament: Kenilworth and Southam

Chesterton is a village in the civil parish of Chesterton and Kingston, in the Stratford-on-Avon district, in Warwickshire, England. The population of the parish taken at the 2011 census was 123. It is about five miles south of Leamington Spa, near the villages of Harbury and Lighthorne.

== Parish ==
The parish of Chesterton and Kingston includes the agricultural area of Kingston east of the village. The parish forms a roughly rectangular block, nearly four miles in length from north-west to south-east and two miles broad. It is home to the notable Chesterton Windmill, built in 1632 from a design attributed to Inigo Jones, just off the Fosse Way and a Grade I listed building. The altitude of the parish ranges from 64 metres in the west to 122 metres in the east being mainly rolling low hills but slightly flatter where the Fosse Way dissects it.

== History ==
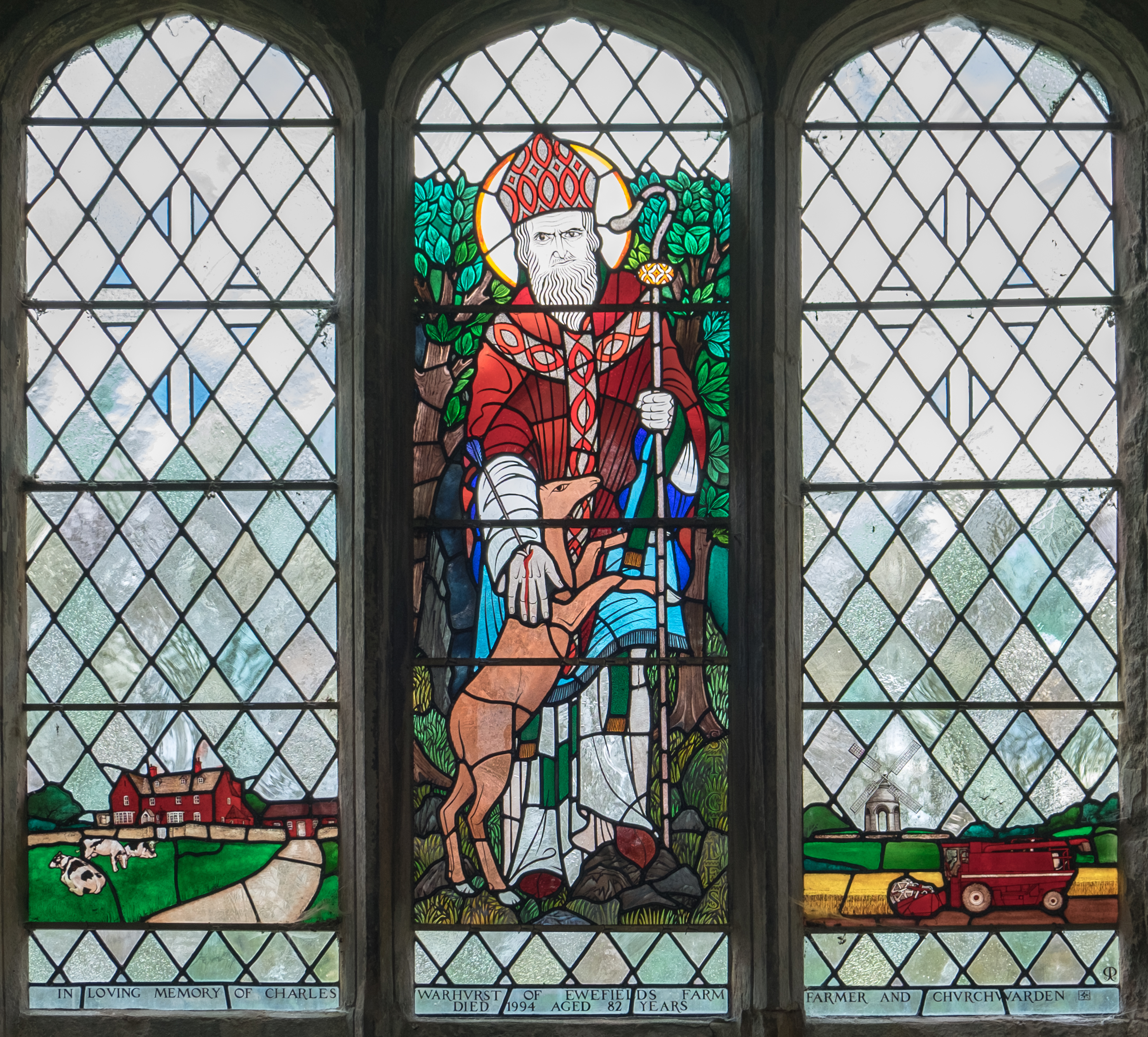
Window in St. Giles Church

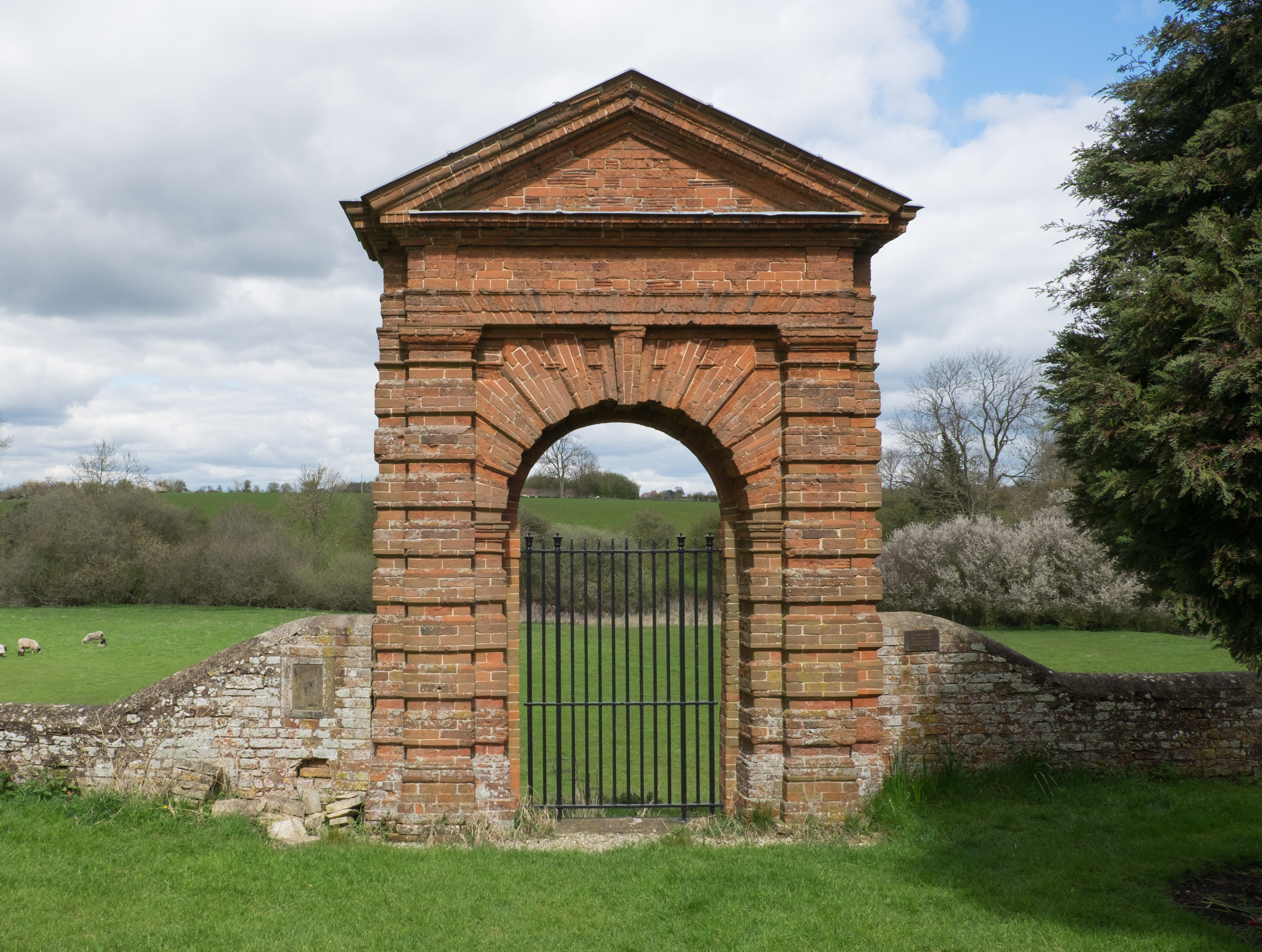
Peyto Gateway behind St. Giles Church

There was a Roman town on the Fosse Way less than a mile from the present village of Chesterton and this was mentioned in the Domesday Book of 1086. The village changed names many times being Cestreyon (1043), Cestedone (1086), Cestertona (1170), Templer Cestreton (1185), Chastreton (1198), Casterton (1292) and Chesterton by 1350. Humble Bee cottages, on the hill where the manor ruins are, are now abandoned, but are thought to have been owned by the ancestors of Lord Willoughby de Broke (John Verney), who was descended from the owners of the manor. Originally, three terraced cottages existed, being rented by farm workers, but the cottage on the far right has been demolished. Actress Sophie Turner spent her childhood in the village.

The parish church dedicated to St. Giles, is thought to date back to the 12th century, the most recent restoration being in 1862. Parish records held at Warwick Records Office date back to 1538. At one time the church served the settlement of Chesterton. This settlement disappeared as a result of the inhabitants moving away to Chesterton Green, after receiving a visit from that most unwelcome of itinerants, the plague. Local rumour has it that tunnels connect the church to nearby Humble Bee cottages. In 1642 the Parish was merged with the neighbouring one of Kingston, to be renamed Chesterton and Kingston.

Since the 1350s much of the village had been in the possession of the Peyto family who lived at Chesterton House. Chesterton House was demolished in 1802 after Margaret Peyto, last of the family, died in 1772 and left her estates to her cousin John Verney of nearby Compton Verney. The remains of the walls and gateway still stand. As well as being involved in the building of the windmill Sir Edward Peyto probably built the nearby watermill which started off as a court house but was converted to a mill in 1634. The stream supplying the mill pond created flooding problems so now no longer tops it up. In the 1960s an attempt to clear the pool failed, killing all the fish and making it stagnant. It was many years before the pool recovered and now has maximum dimensions of 315 by 105 metres.

== Population ==
The population at various stages in time were:

1293: 29 Free Tenants
1299: 20 households
1509: 8 households
1901: 142
1921: 182
1931: 287
2001: 123
2011: 123

== Gallery ==
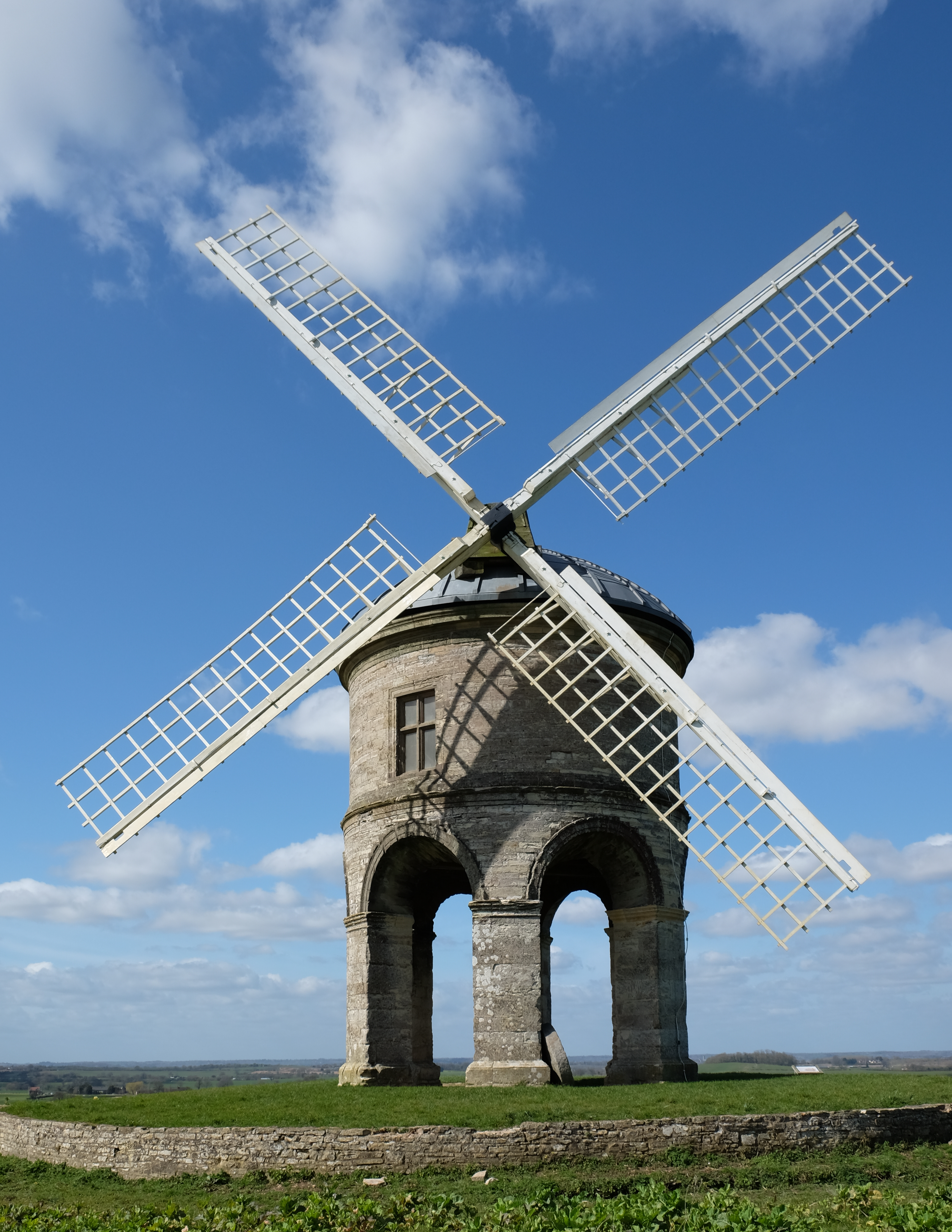
Chesterton Windmill
