= List of windmills in Quebec =

== Windmills in Quebec ==
Location	Name of mill	Type	Built	Notes	Photograph
Bécancour	Moulin de Saint Grégoire; Moulin Bourg; 46°16′18″N 72°30′41″W	Tower	1808		
Cap-Saint-Ignace	Moulin à vent Vincelotte; 47°03′31″N 70°27′08″W	Tower	1690		
Châteauguay	Moulin de l'Île Saint-Bernard	Tower	1686		
Château-Richer		Tower	1665		
Chaudière-Appalaches	Moulin à vent de Saint-Jean-Port-Joli	Tower			
Contrecoeur	Moulin Chaput	Tower	1742		
Faubourg Saint-Laurent		Tower		Marked on map of 1823	
Grondines	Moulin des Hospitalières; Moulin de Grondines; 46°35′03″N 72°02′03″W	Tower	1674	Converted to a lighthouse.	
Île aux Coudres	Moulin Desgagnés	Tower	1836		
Île d'Orléans	Moulin Poulin; Moulin de Sainte-Famille	Tower	c1841		
Île Perrot	Moulin à vent d'Arvor-Vack	Tower			
Lachine		Tower			
LaSalle	Fleming	Tower	1827		
Montreal	Windmill Point	Tower			
Montreal	Église des Récollets (two mills)	Tower			
Neuville	Moulin Voyer	Tower			
Notre-Dame-de-l'Île-Perrot	Pointe-du-Moulin	Tower	1702		
Pointe-aux-Trembles	Moulin de Pointe-aux-Trembles	Tower	1719	Restored.	
Pointe Claire	Pointe-Claire Windmill 45°25′30.32″N 73°49′32.21″W 45.425197 -73.825608	Tower	1709	Ohio Barns	
Quebec City	Moulin à vent de l'Hôpital général de Québec; 46°48′45.57″N 71°13′54.76″W	Tower	1731		
Quebec City	Quebec City Zoological Gardens	Tower			
Repentigny, Quebec	Moulin Grenier; 46°46′02″N 73°25′04″W	Tower	1820		
Repentigny, Quebec	Moulin Antoine-Jetté; 45°45′54″N 73°25′15″W	Tower	1823		
Saint-Antoine-sur-Richelieu		Tower			
Sainte-Famille-de-l'Île-d'Orléans		Tower			
Saint-Paulin		Tower			
Senneville, Quebec	Moulin Le Ber de Senneville; 45°25′49″N 73°58′10″W	Tower	1686		
Trois-Rivières	Moulin de la commune de Trois-Rivières	Tower	1781		
Trois-Rivières	Moulin à vent des forges	Tower		House conversion	
Verchères, Quebec	Moulin Dansereau; Moulin Choquette; 45°47′24″N 73°20′00″W	Tower	1822		
Verchères, Quebec	Madeleine-de-Verchères; Moulin Banal; 45°46′11″N 73°21′24″W	Tower	c1730		

== Notes ==
Mills still standing shown in bold. Known building dates are in bold text. Non-bold text denotes first known date.
