= Oyster Creek =

Oyster Creek may refer to:

== Australia ==
- Oyster Creek, Queensland, a locality in the Gladstone Region

== United States ==
- Oyster Creek (New Jersey), a tributary of Little Egg Harbor in Ocean County
- Oyster Creek Nuclear Generating Station, a nuclear power plant on the above creek
- Oyster Creek, Texas, a city in Brazoria County
- Oyster Creek (Texas), a river in Fort Bend and Brazoria Counties
