= B.L. England Generating Station =

Power plant in New Jersey

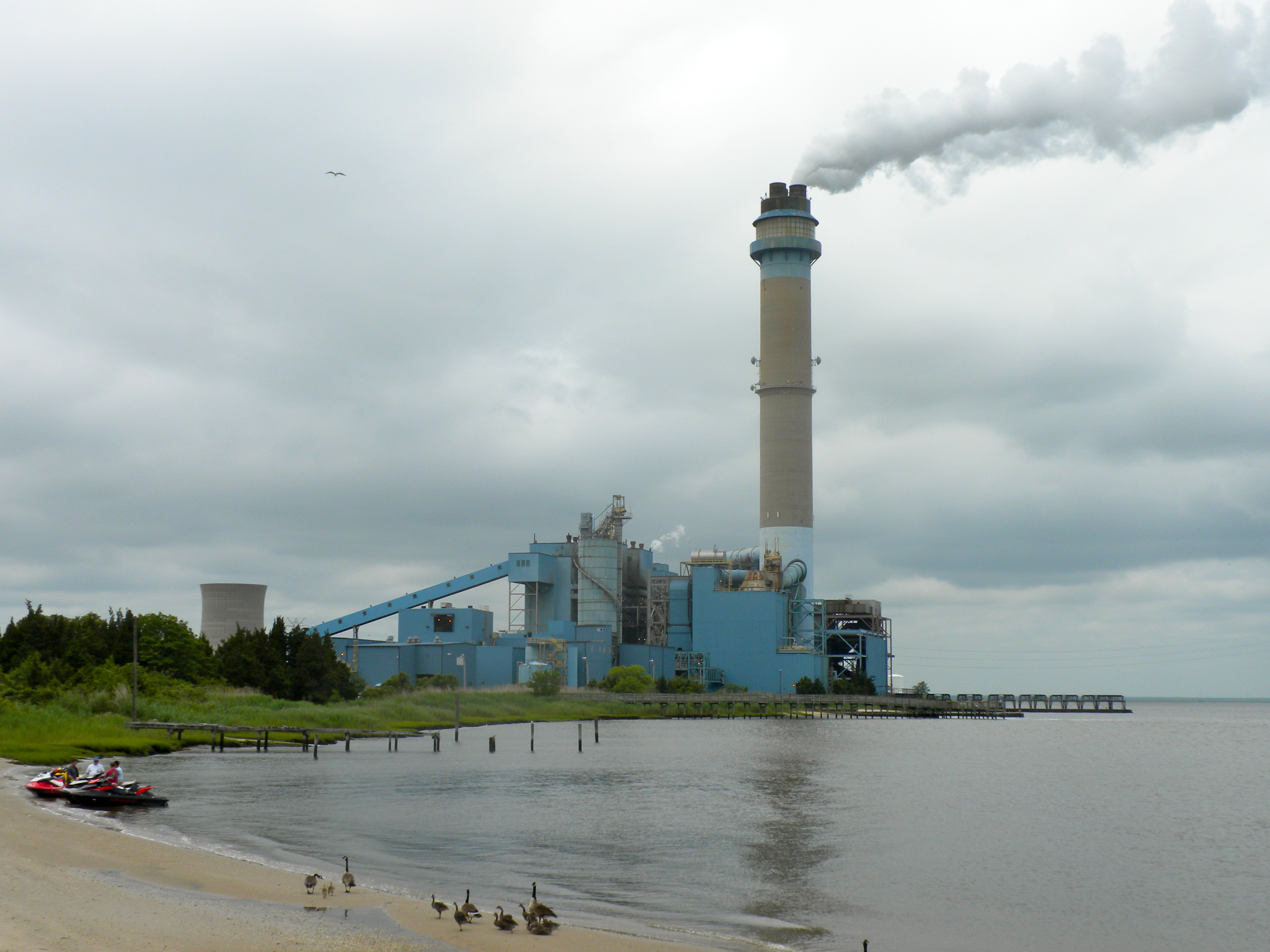
- View of B.L. England Generating Station from the east while in operation.
- Country: United States
- Location: Upper Township, Cape May County, New Jersey
- Coordinates: 39°17′23″N 74°38′02″W
- Status: Demolished
- Commission date: 1961
- Decommission date: May 1, 2019
- Owner: R.C. Cape May Holdings

Thermal power station
- Primary fuel: Coal; Oil; Tires
- Cooling source: Great Egg Harbor River

Power generation
- Nameplate capacity: 450 MW

External links
- Commons: Related media on Commons

The B.L. England Generating Station, also called Beesley's Point Generating Station, was a power plant in Upper Township, Cape May County, New Jersey, United States, on the Great Egg Harbor River. The facility provided approximately 450 megawatts of generating capacity from three generating units. Two units burned coal (and up to 7 percent Tire-derived fuel) and the third unit burned bunker C oil. Its large smokestack, notable for being decorated to resemble a lighthouse, contained a sulfur dioxide scrubber which removed the SO_{2} from the flue gas and converted it into gypsum, which can be sold. The scrubber allowed the two coal units to use less expensive high sulfur coal from West Virginia.

The plant was visible from the Great Egg Harbor Bridge on the Garden State Parkway, and many confused it with the Oyster Creek Nuclear Generating Station because of its hyperboloid cooling tower, which recirculated hot water to avoid discharging into Great Egg Harbor Bay and causing thermal pollution.

The plant was decommissioned on May 1, 2019 and has been demolished, with the majority of the demolition work carried out in 2023.

== History ==
In 1961, four diesel electric generators opened at the site now known as B.L. England. A year later, Atlantic City Electric built Unit 1, a 129 megawatt (MW) coal-powered plant in the Beesley's Point section of Upper Township, New Jersey. This makes it the oldest coal plant in the state. Two years later, the power company built an additional 156 MW coal-burning unit. Both facilities utilized cyclone furnaces to generate power. The coal produced bottom ash that was cooled by the nearby saltwater of the Great Egg Harbor Bay, and was transported by an 8 in (200 mm) cast iron pipe. As the coal was not pulverized, the ash was thicker than usual, causing the iron pipes to rupture.

In 1968, B.L. England Station replaced the cast iron pipes with 840 ft (260 m) of basalt-lined pipes, capable of withstanding temperatures up to 662° F (350° C). These pipes, known as ABRESIST, are among the oldest of their design in the United States. Since their installation in 1968, four sections of the basalt pipes have been replaced, including once in the 1990s when an 18 ft (5.5 m) section of pipe broke near the inside tank. Also in 1968, B.L. England added a water pump and a coal fuel handling unit. In 1974, a cooling tower was added, and another boiler unit was built, expanding the plant's capacity to 450 MW. The smoke stack was replaced in 1987, designed to look like a lighthouse.

On January 24, 2006, the New Jersey Department of Environmental Protection (DEP) issued an administrative consent order to Atlantic City Electric for the power plant violating the Clean Air Act. The order required that the power plant meet performance standards. At that time, the plant released significant amounts of pollutants into the air, lacking state-of-the-art pollution controls. On August 17, RC Cape May Holdings bought the power plant for $12.2 million, assuming all environmental liabilities, which took effect in 2007. In 2011, the company lost a bid for a state government-backed program to construct a new natural gas facility. In 2012, RC Cape May Holdings came to an agreement with the DEP to resolve violations. Under the plan, the oldest coal plant (Unit 1) was shut down in 2013. The other two units were scheduled be converted to a natural gas power plant, which would eliminate most pollutants.

=== Proposed conversion to natural gas ===
On March 8, 2013, South Jersey Gas (SJG) filed a petition with the New Jersey Board of Public Utilities (NJBPU) to build a 24 in (610 mm)-wide, 22 mi (35 km) pipeline from Cumberland Energy Center in Millville to Upper Township. The pipeline would run underneath state and county roads, at a cost of $90 million. The company argued that the pipeline would provide jobs, supply energy within the state, and provide a backup to the main gas line in the region. The company held the first of several public forums on March 8, 2013 in Petersburg, with mixed to negative public feedback to the proposal. On June 21, the NJBPU approved the plan, with additional support from the city of Estell Manor, Upper Township, and the Cape May County Board of Chosen Freeholders. About 10 mi (16 km) of the proposed pipeline would go under the Pinelands National Reserve, where public utilities are banned. SJG proposed to the Pinelands Committee that the group be exempted from adding the new natural gas lines, and in exchange the company would pay $8 million into a fund. The Pinelands Commission voted 7-7, with one abstention, on January 10, 2014. In 2015, SJG resubmitted its proposal. On July 22, the NJBPU approved specified language from SJG that the proposed pipeline would not add additional natural gas customers within the forest areas. The Pinelands Commission passed a certificate of filing on August 14, Pinelands Commission executive director Nancy Wittenberg passed a certificate of filing, stating that the project could proceed because it fell under the comprehensive management plan. On December 16, the NJBPU approved that the proposed pipeline could be built without oversight from local planning boards.

On September 4, 2015, the Pinelands Preservation Alliance (PPA) filed an appeal against the NJBPA. In January 2016, the New Jersey Sierra Club and Environment New Jersey filed a lawsuit against the NJBPU and the Pinelands Commission. In November 2016, the New Jersey Appellate Court ruled that Nancy Wittenberg, director of the Pinelands Commission, overstepped her authority for allowing the project to proceed. On February 24, 2017, the Pinelands Commission voted 9-5 in favor of the project. In response, the New Jersey Sierra Club and Environment New Jersey filed an appeal to the New Jersey Superior Court on April 10, arguing that the pipeline's construction ran counter to the goals of the Pinelands Commission.

In April 2017, B.L. England was scheduled to be shut down temporarily and converted to a natural gas plant, but the order was canceled, with plans to keep the facility operational for another two years. On February 27, 2019, the station's owner abandoned its plans to convert the facility into a natural gas plant. The owner explored other options for a pipeline to Atlantic and Cape May counties on a different route.

=== Closure ===
In December 2016, B.L. England filed to decommission the plant, although that was delayed due to upgrades to the power grid. After the decision not to convert the plant to natural gas, the power plant was permanently shut down on May 1, 2019. The closure potentially affected the yearly budget of Upper Township, which received $6 million each year for hosting the power plant.

B.L. England is currently having parts such as the control room removed and used for other plants. Once scrapping is complete the plant site will be abandoned.

The Ocean Wind offshore wind farm is proposing to use the substation at B.L. England to transmit its power to the grid.

On September 29, 2022, the hyperboloid cooling tower was imploded.

On April 21, 2023, the boiler units were imploded.

The smokestack was imploded on the morning of October 26, 2023.

== Operations ==
As of 2005, B.L. England's annual budget was around $30 million, of which around half was related to maintenance. The facility burned 600,000–700,000 tons of coal per year, of which 30% came from the Powder River Basin, while the remaining is eastern bituminous coal. As a by-product, the facility produced 60,000–70,000 tons of slag per year. Twice per year – for four weeks in the spring and two weeks in the fall – the plant is shut down to transport the slag.

Before its closure, the plant employed about 100 people, which fell to around 70 after the plant was only used for peak capacity.

Prior to its closure, the annual emissions of the facility - when all units were operational - was 10,629 tons of nitrogen oxides (NOx), 40,370 tons of Sulfur dioxide (SO_{2}), and 4,410 tons of particulates smaller than 10 micrometers.
