= Ocean Wind 1 =

Cancelled wind energy project off New Jersey coast

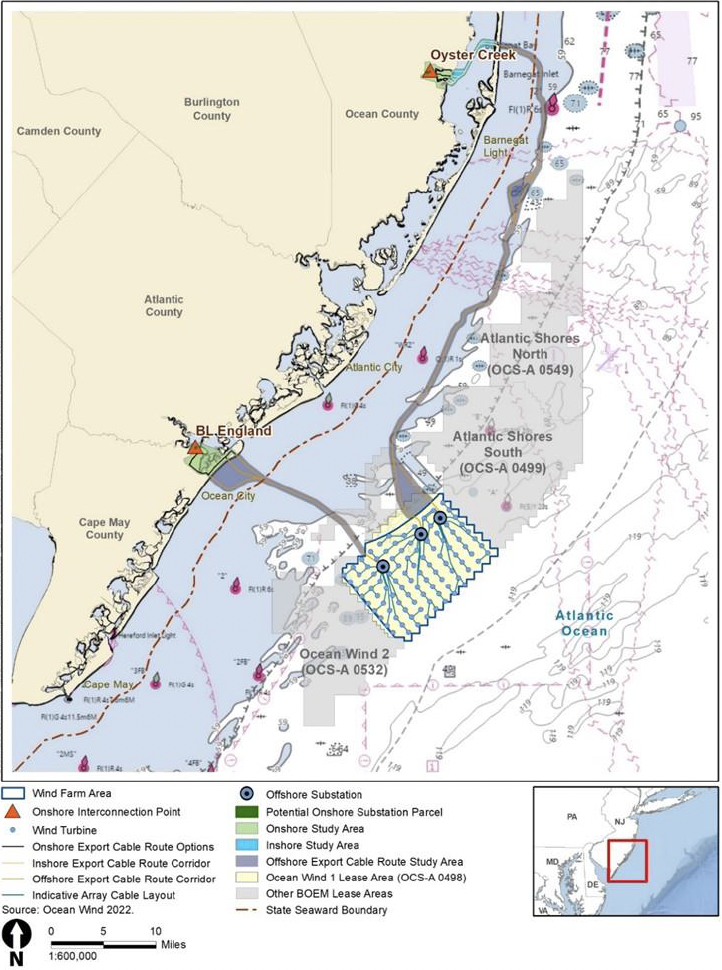
- Ocean Wind 1 Map of Interconnections
- Country: United States
- Location: Lease OCS-A 0498, off the coast of New Jersey
- Coordinates: 39.038°N 74.352°W
- Status: Cancelled
- Owner: Ørsted US Offshore Wind

Wind farm
- Type: Offshore
- Distance from shore: 13 nautical miles (15 mi, 24 km)
- Hub height: 512 ft (156 m)
- Rotor diameter: 788 ft (240 m)
- Site area: 75,525 acres (118 sq mi, 305 sq km)

Power generation
- Nameplate capacity: 1,100 MW

External links
- Website: BOEM Ocean Wind 1 , Ocean Wind 1

Ocean Wind 1 was an offshore wind energy project located approximately 13 nautical miles (15 miles, 24 kilometers) southeast of Atlantic City, New Jersey in the Atlantic Ocean. The project aimed to construct a wind farm with a total capacity of up to 1,100 megawatts (MW). Ocean Wind 1 was supposed to have two landfall sites: the Oyster Creek Landfall Site located in Lacey Township, New Jersey and BL England Landfall Site located in Upper Township, New Jersey. Onshore substations were planned for each point of interconnection (POI). The project was initially expected to be commissioned in 2024.

Ocean Wind 1's development process spanned from 2015-2023. During this period, the project faced challenges, including potential disruptions to navigation, vessel traffic, and impacts on submerged cultural resources. Despite these challenges, the Bureau of Ocean Energy Management (BOEM) approved the project's Construction and Operations Plan (COP) in September 2023, permitting construction to begin. The wind farm was planned to comprise up to 98 Wind Turbine Generators (WTGs) and three offshore substations (OSS) in Lease Area OCS-A 0498. Ocean Wind LLC, a subsidiary of the Danish company Ørsted, was the developer of the project. Public Service Enterprise Group (PSEG) held a 25% equity interest in the project from 2020 to 2023. PSEG sold their 25% equity interest in May 2023.

Ocean Wind 1 was expected to generate 4,851,489 megawatt-hours (MWh) annually, meeting the New Jersey Board of Public Utilities (BPU) requirements for Offshore Renewable Energy Certificates (ORECs). In October 2023, Ørsted announced the cancellation of Ocean Wind 1 due to rising costs, delays, and supply chain constraints. Following the project's cancellation, Ørsted reached a $125 million settlement with the State of New Jersey, and in August 2024, the New Jersey Board of Public Utilities (BPU) vacated the project’s approvals, nullifying its OREC agreement.

== Development Timeline ==
Ocean Wind 1 followed a four-phase development timeline: Early Development & Planning (2011-2018), Environmental Review and Permitting (2019-2023), Record of Decision & Approvals (2020-2023), and Construction & Installation (2023). The project began with BOEM's leasing process in 2011, progressing through environmental assessments and lease divisions. Regulatory milestones included permit applications in 2019, a Draft Environmental Impact Statement (EIS) in 2022, and a Final EIS in 2023, culminating in BOEM's approval of the Construction and Operations Plan (COP) in September 2023. However, in October 2023, Ørsted, the parent company of Ocean Wind LLC, announced it was terminating development of Ocean Wind 1 due to high costs and supply chain constraints. In February 2024, BOEM approved a two-year lease suspension to Ocean Wind LLC for Lease Area OCS-A 0498. During the suspension, Ocean Wind cannot conduct any activities on the lease or comply with the deadlines and schedules agreed in the COP, but Ocean Wind still needs to pay rent.

Early Development & Planning	April 2011: BOEM releases Call for Information & Nominations to assess interest in Call Area and BOEM designates the WEA.; February 2012: Environmental Assessment completed with FONSI.; September 2015: BOEM holds lease auction for Lease Area OCS-A. RES America Developments, Inc. wins the lease.; May 2016: BOEM approves an application to assign 100 percent of Lease Area OCS-A 0498 to Ocean Wind LLC.; May 2018: BOEM approves the SAP.
Environmental Review & Permitting	June 2019: The New Jersey Board of Public Utilities awards Ocean Wind an OREC.; August 2019: Ocean Wind submits initial COP.; March 2021: BOEM approves a partial assignment of a portion of lease OCS-A 0498 that is not covered by the COP to Ørsted North America, Inc.; June 2022: BOEM releases Draft EIS.; April 2023: USFW and NMFS issue BiOps for ESA-listed species within their jurisdiction.; May 2023: BOEM releases Final EIS.
Record of Decision & Approvals	December 2020: PSEG obtains 25% equity interest in Ocean Wind 1.; January 2023: Ørsted announces the acquisition of PSEG’s 25% equity interest in Ocean Wind 1.; July 2023: BOEM & other federal agencies issue joint ROD.; September 2023: BOEM approves final COP.; October 2023: NOAA issues Incidental Take Authorization.
Construction & Installation	October 2023: Ørsted announces that it is ceasing development of Ocean Wind 1.; Late 2024/Early 2025: Anticipated completion of construction before cancellation.

Notes: BOEM= Bureau of Ocean Energy Management. WEA = Wind Energy Area. FONSI = Finding of No Significant Impact. SAP = Site Assessment Plan. OREC= Offshore Renewable Energy Credit. COP= Construction and Operations Plan. EIS = Environmental Impact Statement. USFWS = U.S. Fish and Wildlife Services. NMFS = National Marine Fisheries Service. BiOp = Biological Opinion. ESA = Endangered Species Act. PSEG= Public Service Enterprise Group. NOAA= National Oceanic Atmospheric Administration. ROD = Record of Decision.

== Lease area ==
=== Location ===
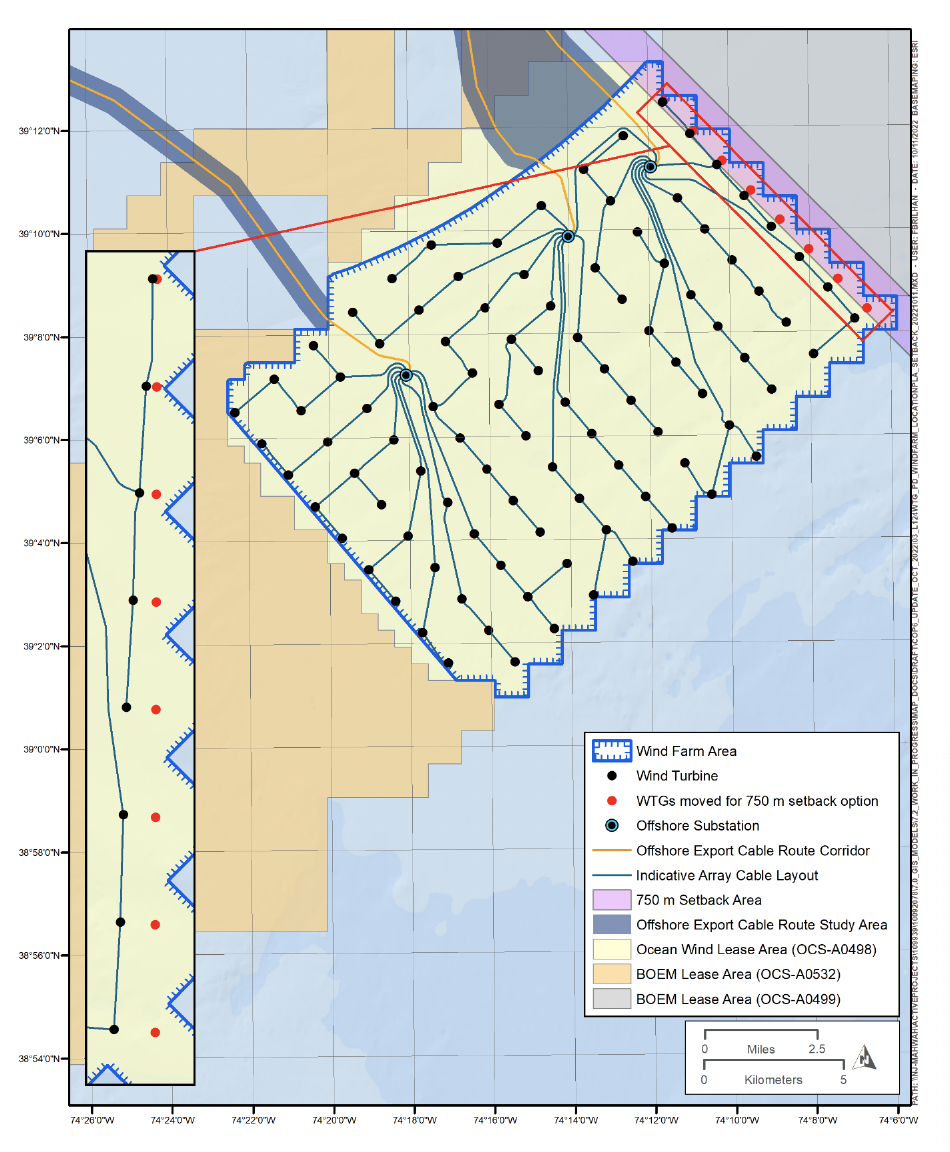
Ocean Wind 1 Lease Area Map

Ocean Wind 1 was planned to be located on Commercial Lease OCS-A 0498, originally consisting of 160,480 acres (250 sq mi, 649 sq km). In March 2021, the lease area was divided into two sections as part of a reassignment process. The northern section, containing 75,525 acres (118 sq mi, 305 sq km), remained as Lease Area OCS-A 0498 for Ocean Wind 1. Ørsted received the southern portion, designated as Lease Area OCS-A 0532, which contained 84,955 acres (132 sq mi, 343 sq km). To mitigate navigation and commercial fishing concerns, a 1,500-meter buffer corridor was established between Atlantic Shores Offshore Wind and Ocean Wind. Ocean Wind 1 was planned at least 13 nautical miles (15 mi, 24 km) offshore to reduce visual impacts.

=== History of lease area ===
In 2009, the Bureau of Ocean Energy Management (BOEM) initiated the renewable energy program (authorized under the Energy Policy Act of 2005), which provides a structure for regional planning and analysis, lease issuance, site assessment, and construction and operations. Also in 2009, BOEM formed the BOEM/New Jersey Renewable Energy Task Force for coordination among affected federal agencies, as well as state, local, and tribal governments through the leasing process. In 2012, BOEM published a Final Environmental Assessment (EA) and Finding of No Significant Impact (FONSI) for commercial wind lease issuance and site assessment activities on the Atlantic Outer Continental Shelf (OCS) offshore New Jersey, Delaware, Maryland, and Virginia. In 2014, BOEM published a Proposed Sale Notice (PSN) for the area of the continental shelf that includes Lease Area OCS-A 0498 and OCS-A 0499. Then, in September 2015, BOEM published a Final Sale Notice—a formal notice that provides the terms and conditions for a lease area—for the commercial lease sale of the Wind Energy Area offshore New Jersey.

On November 9, 2015, BOEM held a competitive lease sale for the Wind Energy Area offshore New Jersey that includes Lease Area OCS-A 0498 and OCS-A 0499. The auction received a total of $1,866,955 in high bids across both lease areas over seven rounds. RES America Developments, Inc. submitted the highest live bid price of $880,715, winning the southern lease area (OCS-A 0498). The lease went into effect on March 1, 2016. BOEM approved the assignment of the entire lease area to Ocean Wind in May 2016 and approved a request to extend the preliminary term of the lease area to March 2018 in March 2017. The initial lease area (OCS-A 0498) was then divided into two separate lease areas in 2021, after Ocean Wind submitted an application for BOEM to assign the portion of Lease Area OCS-A 0498 that is not covered by the COP to Ørsted North America, Inc. After BOEM approved the request, the lease area assigned to Ørsted North America, Inc. became Lease Area OCS-A 0532. The lease operations term for OCS-A 0498 extended 25 years from the Construction and Operations Plan approval, and the first year's rent was $481,440.

In March 2021, a 75:25 joint venture with New Jersey's Public Service Enterprise Group (PSEG) was approved by New Jersey Board of Public Utilities (BPU). PSEG later sold its 25% of equity interest to Ørsted, the parent company of Ocean Wind LLC, granting Ørsted full ownership of Ocean Wind 1. According to PSEG Senior Vice President and Chief Commercial Officer Lathrop Craig, the decision was made after Ocean Wind 1 concluded "a better positioned investor" with an "optimized tax structure" should join the project for the benefit of the project.

== Regulatory and permitting process ==
Three critical parts of the regulatory and permitting process for Ocean Wind 1 were the Site Assessment Plan (SAP), Environmental Impact Statement (EIS), and Construction and Operations Plan (COP). BOEM approved the SAP in May 2018, allowing for the installation of two FLIDAR buoys and one metocean buoy to collect wind and oceanographic data. The Final EIS was published in May 2023, analyzing the project's potential impacts on marine life, fisheries, navigation, and coastal communities. Following this, a joint Record of Decision (ROD) was issued by BOEM, the National Marine Fisheries Service (NMFS), and the United States Army Corps of Engineers (USACE) on July 5, 2023, confirming BOEM’s approval of the COP and outlining required mitigation measures, such as marine mammal protections, archaeological monitoring, and vessel operation guidelines. In October 2023, the National Oceanic and Atmospheric Administration (NOAA) issued final regulations governing the incidental harassment of marine mammals during construction. The associated Letter of Authorization (LOA), effective October 13, 2023 to October 12, 2028, permits Ocean Wind LLC to incidentally take marine mammals (whales, dolphins, seals) during construction and operations.

=== Site assessment plan (SAP) ===
In September 2017, Ocean Wind LLC submitted a site assessment plan (SAP) to BOEM for the installation, operation, and decommissioning of two floating light detection and ranging (FLIDAR) buoys and one metocean buoy to support offshore wind development within Lease Area OCS-A 0498. The SAP underwent multiple revisions, with final approval granted on May 17, 2018. Ocean Wind selected AXYS Technologies Inc. WindSentinel™ FLIDAR buoys for meteorological data collection and a TRIAXYS Wave and Current Buoy to measure oceanographic conditions. These buoys were designed to record wind speed, ocean currents, and atmospheric conditions to assess resource availability for the wind farm. The SAP also outlined mooring system specifications, power supply details, and data transmission methods, ensuring compliance with BOEM regulations. Additionally, the plan included mitigation measures to protect marine life, such as adherence to the Marine Mammal Protection Act (MMPA) and the Endangered Species Act (ESA), as well as vessel strike avoidance protocols. The SAP further specified site clearance, maintenance schedules, and reporting requirements to ensure regulatory compliance and minimize environmental impact throughout the operational period.

=== Environmental impact statement (EIS) ===
The EIS process evaluates the potential impacts of Ocean Wind 1 on physical, biological, socioeconomic, and cultural resources. BOEM prepares the EIS in accordance with the National Environmental Policy Act (NEPA). The process involves a public scoping period to gather input on significant resources, impact-producing factors, reasonable alternatives, and potential mitigation measures. Creating the EIS is a long process that often costs millions of dollars. The estimated lead agency costs associated with developing the Final EIS for Ocean Wind 1 is $2,136,326. BOEM then uses the EIS to inform its decision on whether to approve, approve with modifications, or disapprove a project's COP. Other agencies, such as the U.S. Army Corps of Engineers (USACE) and the National Marine Fisheries Service (NMFS) may adopt the EIS to support their decision-making. The Final EIS was published in May 2023 and includes five detailed alternatives, excluding the “No Action Alternative,” to Ocean Wind 1’s Proposed Action.

- Alternative A (proposed action): This involves the construction, installation, operation, maintenance, and eventual decommissioning of Ocean Wind 1 as originally planned. This is one of the indicated Preferred Alternatives for the project in the EIS.
- Alternative B (no surface occupancy at select locations to reduce visual impacts): This alternative seeks to reduce visual impacts on coastal communities by modifying the wind turbine layout. Two sub-alternatives are considered: one would exclude up to nine WTGs closest to coastal communities, while the other would exclude up to 19 WTGs to further minimize visibility.
- Alternative C (wind turbine layout modification to establish a buffer between Ocean Wind 1 and Atlantic Shores South): This option proposes modifications to the wind turbine array layout to create a buffer zone between Ocean Wind 1 and Atlantic Shores South, aiming to reduce impacts on commercial and recreational fishing, as well as marine navigation. Two sub-alternatives are included: one involves removing select WTGs, while the other reduces the nautical miles between turbine rows to optimize spacing.
- Alternative D (sand ridge and trough avoidance): This alternative adjusts the wind turbine layout to minimize impacts on sand ridge and trough features in the northeastern corner of the lease area. Depending on the approach, between nine and fifteen WTGs would be removed to protect these seabed formations.
- Alternative E (submerged aquatic vegetation avoidance): This option aims to minimize impacts on submerged aquatic vegetation in Barnegat Bay by adjusting the Oyster Creek export cable route. The revised path would enter Island Beach State Park at Swimming Area 2, navigate through parking areas, proceed under Shore Road, and reconnect to the original export cable route via a previously dredged channel, reducing disturbances to aquatic habitats. This is the other indicated Preferred Alternatives for the project in the EIS.

Each of these alternatives were evaluated to determine which would have the least amount of environmental impact across a range of categories. Impacts on marine mammals, commercial fisheries and for-hire recreational fishing, cultural resources, navigational and vessel traffic, scenic and visual resources, and "other uses" were evaluated. “Other Uses” refers to marine mineral extraction, military and national security use, aviation and air traffic, cables and pipelines, radar systems, and scientific research and surveys. Each of these factors were evaluated by looking at the potential for harm from accidental releases, anchoring, cable emplacement and maintenance, gear utilization, land disturbance, lighting, noise, port utilization, presence of structures, and traffic. Based on these factors, each alternative was characterized using a four-level classification scheme, which considers context, intensity, directionality, and duration of effects. Impacts of the alternatives were then broadly classified by impact level as "negligible", "minor", "moderate", or "major" and impact type as "adverse" or "beneficial" on the variety of environmental factors discussed in the report.

=== Record of Decision (ROD) and final approvals ===
In July 2023, a joint record of decision (ROD) was issued by BOEM, NOAA, NMFS, and USAC for Ocean Wind 1. This document confirmed BOEM's approval of the project's Construction and Operations Plan (COP), NMFS's issuance of a Letter of Authorization (LOA) under the Marine Mammal Protection Act (MMPA), and USACE’s issuance of permits under the Rivers and Harbors Act (RHA) of 1899, the Clean Water Act (CWA), and the Marine Protection, Research, and Sanctuaries Act (MPRSA), all of which were necessary for the project to commence construction. The ROD adhered to the National Environmental Policy Act (NEPA) and incorporated mitigation measures to minimize adverse environmental impacts across multiple sectors. These measures included protections for marine archaeological resources, requirements for archaeological monitoring during onshore construction in sensitive areas, visual impact mitigation, and regulations on vessel operation. Additional stipulations covered aircraft detection lighting, debris prevention, avian and bat protection, fisheries management, high-frequency radar interference reduction, and safeguards for protected marine species. The ROD outlined requirements for foundation scour protection monitoring and cable protection to mitigate potential seabed impacts. BOEM officially announced the final approval of the COP under the "Preferred Alternative" on July 5, 2023, selecting Alternative A (Proposed Action) in conjunction with Alternative E (Submerged Aquatic Vegetation Avoidance). This decision allowed for the installation of up to 98 wind turbine generators (WTGs) and three offshore substations (OSS) off the coast of New Jersey, with export cables making landfall in Ocean County and Cape May County.

== Financing ==
=== Offtake agreement ===
Proposed offshore wind projects in New Jersey can secure Offshore Wind Renewable Energy Credits (ORECs) through state solicitations. Ocean Wind 1 was awarded an OREC agreement in June 2019, as part of New Jersey's First Solicitation in September 2018. Under its OREC agreement, Ocean Wind 1 was entitled to collect OREC fees starting at $98.10/MWh, with a 2% annual escalation over a 20-year period. The levelized net OREC cost (LNOC), which factors in energy and capacity revenues refunded to ratepayers, was estimated at $46.46/MWh. The project was expected to result in an average monthly bill increase of approximately $1.46 for residential customers, $13.05 for commercial customers, and $110.10 for industrial customers. The levelized cost of energy (LCOE) for Ocean Wind 1, including estimated transmission costs, was not publicly disclosed, though offshore wind transmission costs typically range between $12–$25/MWh.

=== Cost and finance structure ===
Ocean Wind 1 also qualified for federal tax credits. Under the 2022 Inflation Reduction Act (IRA), offshore wind projects were eligible for a 30% Investment Tax Credit (ITC) on capital costs. In July 2023, New Jersey Governor Phil Murphy signed legislation (A5651/S4019), allowing Ørsted to retain federal tax credits intended to support offshore wind development in order to improve the project's financial viability amid rising costs. Levitan & Associates, Inc. (LAI), the firm responsible for evaluating bids for New Jersey's offshore wind solicitations, incorporated available federal tax credits in its OREC price analysis for Ocean Wind 1.

Despite securing OREC funding, federal incentives, and special legislation, Ørsted cancelled Ocean Wind 1 in October 2023. Following the project's cancellation, Ørsted reached a $125 million settlement with the State of New Jersey, and in August 2024, the New Jersey Board of Public Utilities (BPU) vacated the project’s approvals, nullifying its OREC agreement.

== Infrastructure and development ==
The construction of Ocean Wind 1 was planned to take place over several years, with key activities beginning in late 2023. Initial work was supposed to include high-resolution geophysical (HRG) surveys and the installation of onshore export cables and substations, followed by landfall cable installation and offshore export cable placement. In mid-2024, the project planned to install wind turbines (WTGs), offshore substations, and inter-array cables. The commissioning of turbines was expected by early 2025. However, in October 2023, Ørsted cancelled Ocean Wind 1, citing macroeconomic challenges including high inflation, rising interest rates, and supply chain constraints.

=== Construction timeline ===
Activity	Duration	Start date
HRG Surveys	24 months	Q4-2023
Onshore Export Cables and Onshore Substations	18 months	Q3-2023
UXO Detonation, if required	3 months	Q4-2023
Landfall Cable Installation Works	9 months	Q4-2023
Offshore Export Cable Installation Activities	6 months	Q3-2024
Offshore Export Cable Installation (WTGS and Offshore Substations)	9 months	Q2-2024
Inter-array Cable Installation	9 months	Q3-2024
Turbines (WTGs) and Offshore Substation Installation and Commissioning	9 months	Q3-2024

=== Offshore wind farm ===
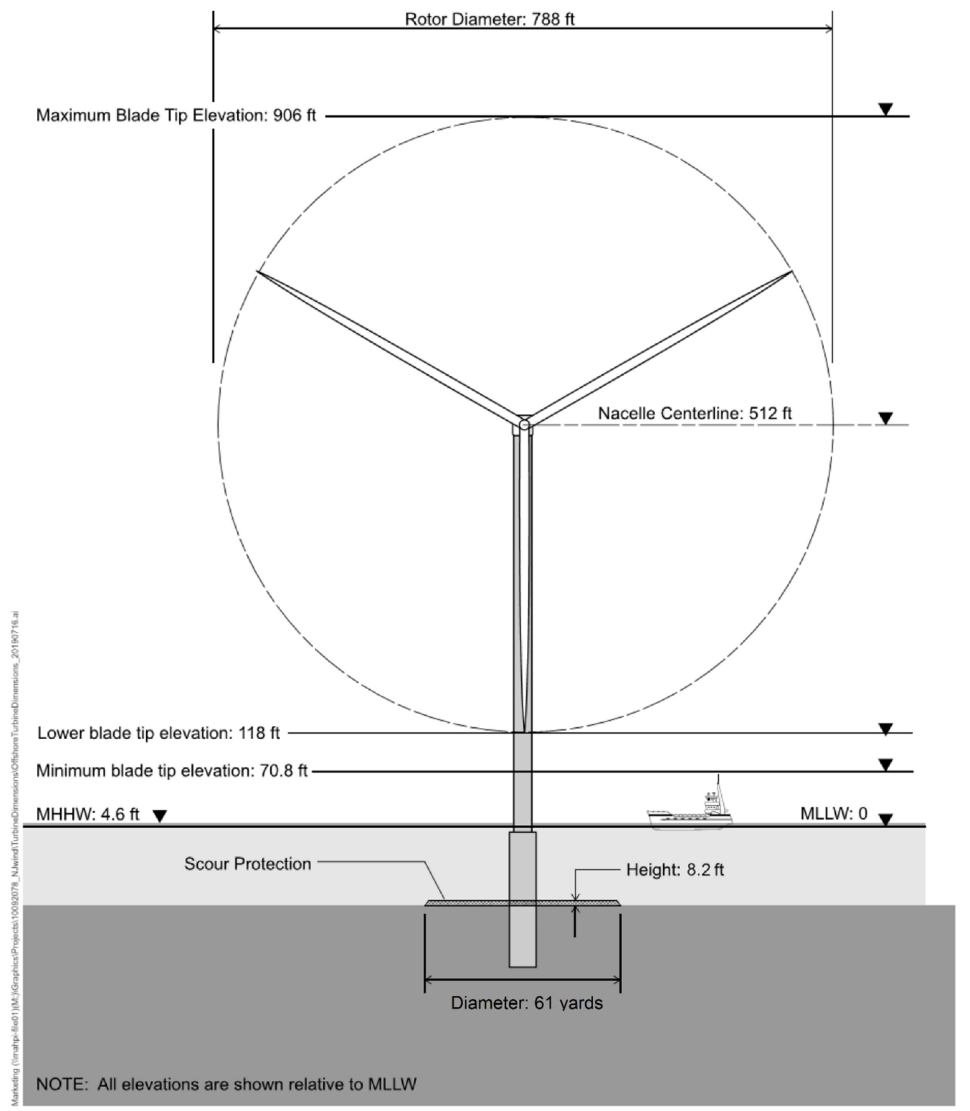
Wind Turbine Specs

In 2019, Ocean Wind 1 selected GE Renewable Energy as its preferred turbine supplier, opting for the Haliade-X 12 MW offshore wind turbines, one of the most powerful models available at the time. These wind turbine generators (WTGs) featured a rotor diameter of 788 ft (240 m) and blade lengths of approximately 394 ft (120 m), allowing for high energy output while minimizing the number of turbines needed for the project. The maximum blade tip elevation was 906 ft (276 m), with a nacelle centerline height of 512 ft (156 m). The lower blade tip elevation was 118 ft (36 m), ensuring clearance for vessel navigation in the lease area. The turbines were designed for an engineered lifespan of 25 years and optimized for efficiency, with a cut-in wind speed of 3 m/s and a cut-out wind speed of 25 m/s. The foundations for the WTGs were to be monopiles, installed with scour protection to prevent seabed erosion. The monopile diameter was 61 yd (55.8 m), and the foundation height above the seabed was 8.2 ft (2.5 m). Monopile installation was expected to take approximately 8-10 hours per turbine, with a maximum of two installed per day per vessel. The turbines were to be arranged in an east-northeast/west-southwest grid layout to optimize wind capture and minimize wake effects. Ocean Wind 1 planned for up to 98 WTGs, generating a total nameplate capacity of up to 1,100 MW.

The project included three offshore substations (OSSs) to collect and transmit generated electricity back to shore. A permanent meteorological tower was planned for installation within the lease area to monitor wind conditions and support operational assessments. Two temporary metocean buoys were also proposed to collect oceanographic and atmospheric data during the construction and operational phases.

=== Grid interconnection ===
==== Onshore facilities ====
The onshore facilities for Ocean Wind 1 were planned to include an extensive onshore export cable system, substations, and grid connection infrastructure to integrate offshore wind energy into New Jersey’s power grid. The project had two primary interconnection points at Oyster Creek and BL England, each requiring an onshore substation. The onshore export cables were designed to connect to offshore cables at transition joint bays (TJBs) at designated landfall sites and would then be routed underground via duct banks to the substations. The cables were planned to transmit power at either 275 kV or 220 kV, with the BL England substation stepping the voltage down to 138 kV and the Oyster Creek substation stepping it down to 230 kV for grid integration. To reduce environmental and logistical impacts, installation techniques such as horizontal directional drilling (HDD) were planned for use in sensitive areas, including roads, wetlands, and waterbodies. An Operations and Maintenance (O&M) Facility in Atlantic City was proposed to serve as a regional hub for monitoring and maintaining onshore and offshore infrastructure.

In September 2019, Ocean Wind secured capacity interconnection rights for the Oyster Creek Nuclear Generating Station in Lacey Township, a 619-megawatt nuclear power plant that was decommissioned in September 2018. The project planned to utilize the existing power infrastructure of the former plant, with necessary upgrades, to connect to the regional transmission grid. Additionally, in February 2022, Ørsted filed a petition with the New Jersey Board of Public Utilities (BPU) to construct an onshore power cable through Ocean City, connecting the offshore substations to the mainland. The New Jersey BPU approved the cable's path through wetlands on September 28, 2022, and granted further approval on February 23, 2023, allowing construction under local roads in Ocean City, confirming that the project would not cause harm to the city. Furthermore, in February 2023, Ocean Wind 1 received approval to connect the offshore wind farm to the BL England Generating Station in Upper Township via an underground cable and an onshore connection in Ocean City.

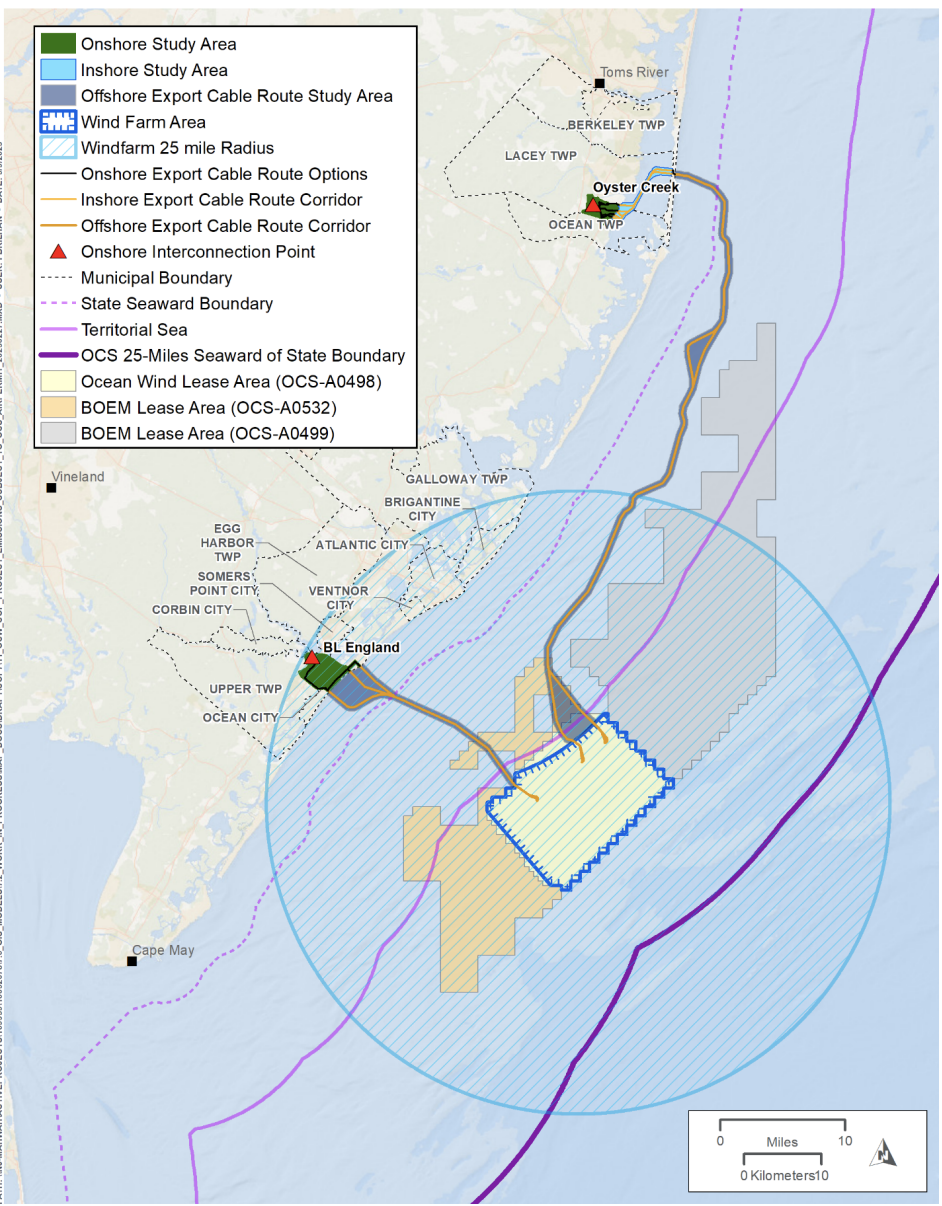
Points of Interconnection for Ocean Wind 1

==== Point of interconnection (POI) ====
After evaluating 14 potential locations across New Jersey, Ocean Wind 1 selected Oyster Creek and BL England as its two Points of Interconnection (POI). Monmouth, Dennis, Deepwater, and Salem were eliminated due to engineering constraints, required grid upgrades, environmental permitting challenges, and lack of available real estate for an onshore substation. Following those eliminations, Manitou, Deans, Lewis, and Larrabee were ruled out due to long cable routes, the need for HVAC boosters or HVDC systems, and limited viable onshore cable routing opportunities. The Higbee and Ontario substations in Atlantic City, while geographically close to the offshore wind farm, could not accommodate the project’s power output without major grid upgrades that did not align with the project timeline.

At Oyster Creek, up to two offshore export cables were planned to make landfall and connect to an onshore substation requiring 31.5 acres of permanent space and 2 additional acres for construction. The onshore grid connection was designed to be 0.5 miles in length, with both underground and overhead transmission line options considered. The substation was planned to be constructed on 24-inch aggregate piers reaching 18 ft below ground with a spread footing system. The average elevation at the site was 25 ft above mean sea level (MSL). At BL England, one offshore export cable was planned to interconnect at the existing BL England substation, requiring a 13-acre permanent site and an additional 3 acres for construction within a 23.68-acre potential disturbance area. The onshore grid connection was to use underground transmission cables to link the substation to Beesley’s Power Substation, with a maximum cable length of 0.5 miles. The substation was designed to be built on driven piles between 30 and 40 ft deep, with an average site elevation of 12 ft above MSL.

==== Offshore facilities ====
The offshore facilities for Ocean Wind 1 were planned to include up to 98 wind turbines (WTGs) installed within the Wind Farm Area, using monopile foundations with potential scour protection to prevent seabed erosion. Each WTG would be linked by an array cable system to up to three offshore substations (OSS), which were designed to step up and regulate voltage before transmission to the onshore grid. The OSS structures were to be mounted on modular support frames or jacket foundations, with pile driving hammers used for installation. They would house switchgear, transformers, reactive compensation equipment, backup generators, and control panels, with safety features such as fire suppression systems, life rafts, and CCTV monitoring. Substation interconnector cables were planned to connect the OSS units to each other, while offshore export cables would transfer the electricity to the onshore facilities through trench-less or open-cut landfall methods at designated sites. Wave buoys and metocean buoys were also planned to monitor ocean conditions and structural integrity during and after construction. The installation of offshore components would require specialized vessels, including jack-up barges, sheerleg barges, and heavy-lift vessels, with estimated installation windows ranging from 3.5 days for array cables to 59 days for offshore export cables.

== Benefits and concerns ==
=== Socio-economic ===
==== Revenue and jobs ====
Ocean Wind estimated that the project would generate $944 million in economic benefits for New Jersey through direct, indirect, and induced contributions. The project was expected to create 6,598 job-years during construction, meaning the total labor required would be equivalent to 6,598 full-time jobs lasting one year. However, the actual number of workers employed at any given time would vary based on the project’s timeline. During operations, the project was projected to sustain 2,780 direct job-years, with total employment reaching 6,000 job-years when including indirect and induced jobs over its lifespan. Ocean Wind 1 also planned to invest $15 million into the Pro-NJ Trust to support workforce development, port infrastructure, and minority- and women-owned businesses. The project was expected to generate $254 million in federal, state, and local tax revenues, benefiting public infrastructure and services. However, Ørsted’s cancellation of Ocean Wind 1 in October 2023 meant that these economic benefits Ocean Wind projected were never realized.

==== Fisheries and vessels ====
The Final Environmental Impact Statement (EIS), states that the construction, operation, and decommissioning phases of Ocean Wind 1 was anticipated to have "minor to major adverse" effects on commercial fishing and minor to "moderate adverse" effects on for-hire recreational fishing. Key concerns included physical seabed disturbances, habitat conversion, noise pollution, increased vessel traffic, and economic disruptions. Noise from turbine installation and maintenance activities was expected to cause temporary avoidance of certain fishing areas, while benthic species with limited mobility could face habitat loss. While WTGs can create long-term benefits through the artificial reef effect, attracting fish and potentially benefiting for-hire recreational fishing, these benefits would not fully compensate for the economic and cultural losses faced by commercial fishers.

The FEIS noted a “moderate” effect on vessel navigation and maritime industries. Increased vessel traffic during construction and maintenance posed a risk to navigational safety, with concerns about allisions (vessel collisions with stationary objects) and restricted maneuverability for fishing vessels within the wind farm lease area. The presence of turbines and offshore substations could complicate navigation routes, requiring additional travel time and increasing fuel costs for commercial fishers.

Ocean Wind 1 proposed several mitigation measures to minimize disruptions to fisheries and vessels, focusing on stakeholder outreach, compensation programs, and navigational safety enhancements. The project planned to employ Fisheries Liaison Officers and Fisheries Representatives to facilitate communication with the fishing community. A Gear Claim Procedure was established, modeled after NOAA’s Fishermen’s Contingency Fund, allowing fishers to seek reimbursement for lost or damaged gear, lost catch, and business interruptions. A Direct Compensation Program was designed to provide financial support to commercial and for-hire recreational fishers, with compensation based on annual average landings and revenue loss. To address navigational safety concerns, Ocean Wind 1 proposed a Navigational Safety Fund, which would have provided grants of up to $10,000 for vessel owners to upgrade navigation equipment such as AIS transceivers and pulse compression radar systems. The fund also included a training component, offering up to $1,000 in financial assistance for professional maritime courses. These programs aimed to reduce financial hardships, enhance safety, and maintain collaboration between the offshore wind industry and the fishing community.

=== Climate and environment ===
==== Marine impacts ====
According to the Final Environmental Impact Statement (EIS), Ocean Wind 1 was anticipated to have "minor to moderate effects" on air quality and "moderate" effects on water quality due to the release of pollutants during construction activities. The project was projected to have "moderate to moderate beneficial" impacts on benthic resources, as construction activities could cause habitat disturbance but also potentially create artificial reef habitats. "Moderate" impacts on coastal habitats and fauna were also expected during the construction phase. A significant concern surrounding the project was its potential impact on marine mammals, particularly the endangered North Atlantic Right Whale (NARW). The primary risks identified included vessel strikes and noise-related disturbances from construction activities. However, scientific studies have not established a direct causal link between offshore wind projects and whale mortality. NOAA has stated, "At this point, there is no scientific evidence that noise resulting from offshore wind site characterization surveys could potentially cause whale deaths." The Final EIS identified "minor to moderate" impacts on mysticetes, odontocetes, and pinnipeds, with "moderate to major" impacts specifically on the NARW. Mitigation measures proposed by Ocean Wind 1 to minimize these impacts included seasonal pile-driving restrictions, vessel speed limits of 10 knots, and passive acoustic monitoring to detect whale presence.

==== Opposition movements ====
Community organizations and local advocacy groups have expressed strong opposition to Ocean Wind 1, citing potential negative economic and environmental consequences. Save Long Beach Island (Save LBI), a coalition of citizens, emerged as a leading critic of the project, raising concerns about its impact on marine life and the local economy. The group has actively pursued legal action against the project, challenging it in both state and federal courts. In January 2025, Save LBI filed a lawsuit against the U.S. Department of Commerce and other federal agencies, alleging violations of environmental statutes in the approval of offshore wind projects.

New Jersey Representative Jeff Van Drew (R-NJ-2) publicly called on President Donald Trump to sign an executive order ceasing offshore wind activities in early January 2025. Ten days into his presidency, President Trump announced a "Temporary Withdrawal of All Areas on the Outer Continental Shelf from Offshore Wind Leasing and Review of the Federal Government’s Leasing and Permitting Practices for Wind Projects" on January 30, 2025, signaling a hostile federal administration towards offshore wind projects.

==== Clean energy benefits ====
Ocean Wind 1 was designed to generate up to 1,100 megawatts (MW) of electricity. The project aligned with New Jersey’s clean energy goals, contributing to the state’s target of achieving 100% clean energy by 2035. By providing a substantial source of zero-carbon renewable energy, the project aims to reduce reliance on fossil fuels, thereby decreasing greenhouse gas emissions and enhancing air quality. Offshore wind energy is a pivotal element of New Jersey's strategy to transition to sustainable energy sources and combat climate change.

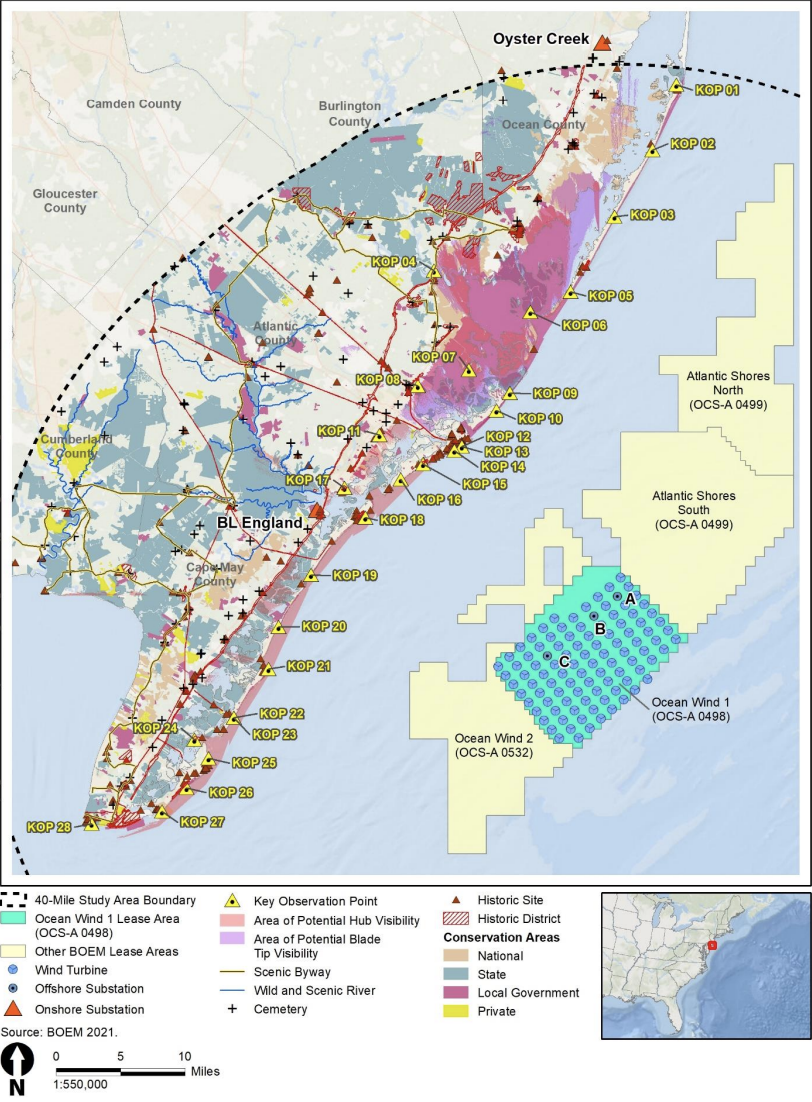
Scenic Resources and Key Observation Points for Ocean Wind 1

=== Scenic and visual resources ===
==== Historic sites ====
The Ocean Wind 1 Project was evaluated for its potential visual impacts on historic properties under Section 106 of the National Historic Preservation Act (NHPA). The Bureau of Ocean Energy Management (BOEM) determined that the project would have adverse visual effects on five historic properties in New Jersey, including the Riviera Apartments, Vassar Square Condominiums, House at 114 S. Harvard Ave, the Charles Fischer House, and the Ocean City Music Pier. These properties are eligible for the National Register of Historic Places (NRHP) due to their unobstructed ocean views, which contribute to their historic significance and cultural identity. The installation of wind turbine generators (WTGs) offshore would have altered these views, affecting the setting, feeling, and association of these properties with the ocean. BOEM's review highlighted that Ocean Wind 1 would contribute to cumulative visual impacts alongside other offshore wind projects in the region, with its turbines accounting for 16–17% of the total turbines visible from affected historic sites.

==== Tribal nation consultation ====
The Bureau of Ocean Energy Management (BOEM) conducted government-to-government consultations with federally recognized tribal nations as part of the Section 106 review process under the National Historic Preservation Act (NHPA) for Ocean Wind 1. On June 17, 2021, BOEM held consultations with the Delaware Nation and the Delaware Tribe of Indians to assess potential impacts on culturally and historically significant sites within the project’s Area of Potential Effects (APE). BOEM also extended invitations to other federally recognized tribes that may have been affected by the project, ensuring that their concerns regarding offshore and onshore construction, visual impacts, and potential disturbances to submerged archaeological resources were considered. These discussions focused on identifying and protecting ancestral lands, submerged prehistoric sites, and other areas of tribal significance. BOEM, in collaboration with State Historic Preservation Officers (SHPOs) and Tribal Historic Preservation Officers (THPOs), continued engagement efforts throughout the permitting process, incorporating tribal input into project planning and mitigation strategies.

== Current status and future outlook ==
Ocean Wind 1 was initially envisioned to be one of the largest offshore wind projects in the United States. However, in October 2023, Ørsted announced it would cease development due to rising costs and supply chain constraints. In February 2024, BOEM updated the project’s page, confirming the approval of a two-year lease suspension. By August 2024, New Jersey granted Ørsted’s request to revoke the BPU’s designation of Ocean Wind 1 as a Qualified Offshore Wind Project (QOWP), and no offshore wind developer has since announced plans to utilize the lease areas. Ørsted had originally committed $300 million in guarantees to ensure the project’s completion but later argued that payment was not required following its cancellation. In May 2024, the State of New Jersey reached a settlement with Ørsted, securing a $125 million payment to support offshore wind and clean energy investments.

== See also ==
- Offshore Wind Power in the United States
- Bureau of Ocean Energy Management
- New Jersey Board of Public Utilities
- Ørsted US Offshore Wind
- Environmental impact of wind power
- Energy Policy Act of 2005
