= Cyclone furnace =

A cyclone furnace is a type of coal combustor commonly used in large industrial boilers.

== Background ==
Developed in the early 1942 by Babcock & Wilcox to take advantage of coal grades not suitable for pulverized coal combustion, cyclone furnaces feed coal in a spiral manner into a combustion chamber for maximum combustion efficiency.

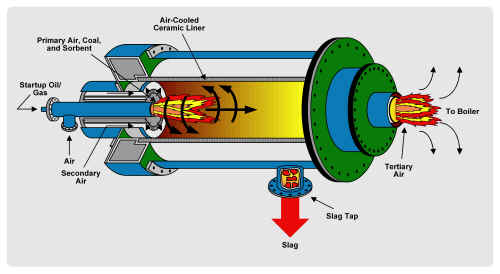
A typical cyclone combustor

During coal combustion in a furnace, volatile components burn without much difficulty. Fuel carbon “char” particles (heavier, less volatile coal constituents) require much higher temperatures and a continuing supply of oxygen. Cyclone furnaces are able to provide a thorough mixing of coal particles and air with sufficient turbulence to provide fresh air to surfaces of the coal particles.

Cyclone furnaces were originally designed to take advantage of four things

1. Lower fuel preparation time and costs
2. Smaller more compact furnaces
3. Less fly ash and convective pass slagging
4. Flexibility in fuel types

== Operation ==
A cyclone furnace consists of a horizontal cylindrical barrel attached through the side of a boiler furnace. The cyclone barrel is constructed with water cooled, tangential oriented, tube construction. Inside the cyclone barrel are short, densely spaced, pin studs welded to the outside of the tubes. The studs are coated with a refractory material, usually silica or aluminium based, that allows the cyclone to operate at a high enough temperature to keep the slag in a molten state and allow removal through the tap.

Crushed coal and a small amount of primary air enter from the front of the cyclone into the burner. In the main cyclone burner, secondary air is introduced tangentially, causing a circulating gas flow pattern. The products, flue gas and un-combusted fuel, then leave the burner and pass over the boiler tubes. Tertiary air is then released further downstream to complete combustion of the remaining fuel, greatly reducing NOx formation. A layer of molten slag coats the burner and flows through traps at the bottom of the burners, reducing the amount of slag that would otherwise form on the boiler tubes.

Cyclone Furnaces can handle a wide range of fuels. Low volatile bituminous coals, lignite coal, mineral rich anthracitic coal, wood chips, petroleum coke, and old tires can and have all been used in cyclones.

The crushed coal is fed into the cyclone burner and fired with high rates of heat release. Before the hot gases enter in the boiler furnace the combustion of coal is completed. The crushed coal is fed into cyclone burners. The coal is Burned by centrifugal action which is imparted by the primary air which enters tangentially and secondary Air which also enters in the top tangentially at high speed and tertiary air is admitted in the centre. Due to Whirling action of coal and air, a large amount of heat is generated (1500–1600 °C) and that covered the surface of cyclone and ashes are transformed into molten slag. The molten slag drained from the boiler furnace through a slag tap.
