= Oyster Creek (New Jersey) =

River in New Jersey, United States

Oyster Creek is a 10.4-mile-long (16.7 km) tributary of Barnegat Bay in southeastern New Jersey in the United States.

The creek is located approximately 2 miles (3 km) south of Forked River in southern Ocean County.

The Oyster Creek Nuclear Generating Station is located on an 800-acre (3.2 km^{2}) site at Forked River. It opened in 1969 and was closed down on September 17, 2018.

== See also ==
- List of rivers of New Jersey
