= Oyster Creek Nuclear Generating Station =

Inactive nuclear power plant in Ocean County, New Jersey, US

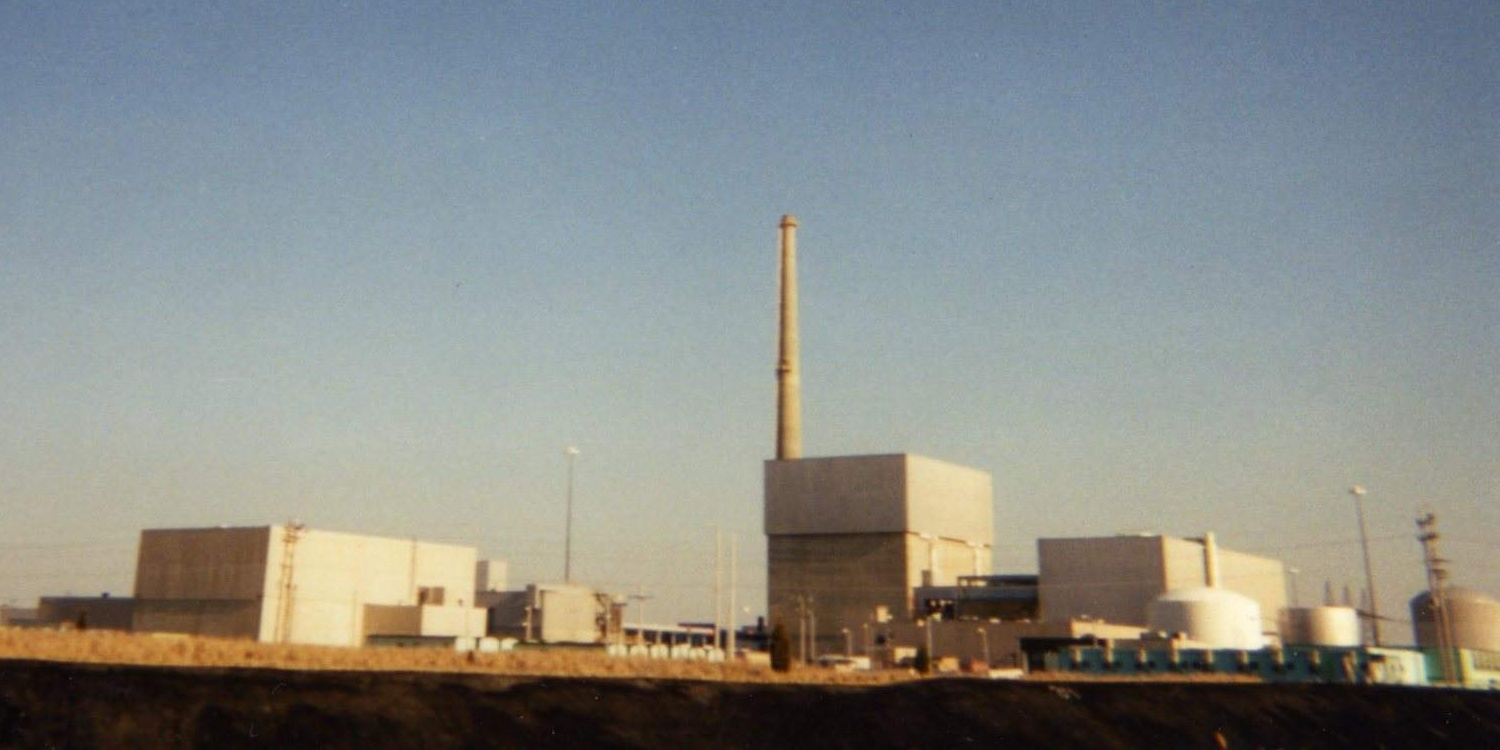
- Oyster Creek Nuclear Plant in 1998. At the time, it was owned and operated by General Public Utilities.
- Country: United States
- Location: Lacey Township, Ocean County, New Jersey
- Coordinates: 39°48′53″N 74°12′18″W
- Status: Being decommissioned
- Construction began: December 15, 1964
- Commission date: December 23, 1969
- Decommission date: September 17, 2018
- Construction cost: $488 million (2007 USD)
- Owner: Oyster Creek Environmental Protection
- Operator: Holtec Decommissioning International

Nuclear power station
- Reactor type: BWR
- Reactor supplier: General Electric
- Cooling source: Barnegat Bay

Power generation
- Make and model: BWR-2 (Mark 1)
- Units decommissioned: 1 × 619 MW (1930 MW_{th})
- Nameplate capacity: 550 MW; 652 MW
- Capacity factor: 100.14% (2017); 74.0% (lifetime)

External links
- Website: Oyster Creek Generating Station
- Commons: Related media on Commons

Oyster Creek Nuclear Power Station is an inactive single unit 636 MWe boiling water reactor power plant in the United States. The plant is located on an 800-acre (3.2 km^{2}) site adjacent to Oyster Creek in the Forked River section of Lacey Township in Ocean County, New Jersey. At the time of its closure, the facility was owned by Exelon Corporation and, along with unit 1 at Nine Mile Point Nuclear Generating Station, was the oldest operating commercial nuclear power plant in the United States. The plant first started commercial operation on December 23, 1969, and is licensed to operate until April 9, 2029, but Oyster Creek was permanently shut down in September 2018. The plant got its cooling water from Barnegat Bay, a brackish estuary that empties into the Atlantic Ocean through the Barnegat Inlet.

At the time of shutdown, Oyster Creek was one of four licensed nuclear power reactors in New Jersey. The others are the two units at the Salem Nuclear Power Plant, and the one unit at Hope Creek Nuclear Generating Station. As of January 1, 2005, New Jersey ranked 9th among the 31 states with nuclear capacity for total MWe generated. In 2003, nuclear power generated over one half of the electricity in the state.

In 1999, GPU agreed to sell the Oyster Creek Nuclear Plant to AmerGen Energy for $10 million. AmerGen was later purchased by Exelon in 2003. Exelon fully integrated AmerGen's former assets, including Oyster Creek, in early 2009.

The reactor was shut down on September 17, 2018.

In September 2019, Ocean Wind, a proposed 1,100 MWe offshore wind farm, with the approval of the New Jersey Board of Public Utilities, secured the capacity interconnection rights to bring the power generated by the wind farm on-shore at Oyster Creek. It can use the existing power infrastructure of the plant, after some upgrades, to connect to the regional transmission grid.

In January 2021, Holtec suggested that a "new generation" nuclear plant might be built at the location.

== Design ==
Oyster Creek was a 636 MWe single-unit boiling water reactor nuclear power plant. It began operating on December 23, 1969, and was one of the oldest nuclear plants in the United States until it permanently closed on September 17, 2018. The facility was located approximately 50 miles (80 km) east of Philadelphia and 75 miles (121 km) south of New York City.

The plant used cooling water from Barnegat Bay, a brackish estuary connected to the Atlantic Ocean through Barnegat Inlet. It employed a Rankine cycle condenser cooling system, with a coolant flow rate of about 1.4 billion US gallons (5.3 billion liters) per day and an average temperature increase of 10.4 °F (5.8 °C).

Originally licensed for 40 years, Oyster Creek received a 20-year license extension from the United States Nuclear Regulatory Commission (NRC) in April 2009. Under the Atomic Energy Act, the NRC issues reactor licenses for up to 40 years, with the option to renew for an additional 20 years. The original 40-year term was based on economic and antitrust considerations, not on technical limitations of nuclear technology. Some plant components were designed with a 40-year service life in mind.

== License extension ==
In July 2005, Exelon submitted an application to the United States Nuclear Regulatory Commission for a 20-year extension of the existing 40-year license for Oyster Creek, which was due to expire in 2009. According to a 2006 survey commissioned by the operators, relicensing of the power plant was supported by the majority of citizens living in areas surrounding the plant, and by local elected officials. However, some local opposition to re-licensing was evident at public hearings on the issue. On May 31, 2007, several Ocean County residents attended the Atomic Safety Licensing Board (ASLB) hearing in the county administration building. At that meeting, several of the local residents were opposed to re-licensing of the nuclear power plant.

The ASLB's decision led to a full public hearing on the issue of the monitoring of corrosion in the plant's drywell liner. The hearing was scheduled for September 24, 2007 in the county seat Toms River. In 2008, the Atomic Safety and Licensing Board twice rejected citizens' contentions concerning Oyster Creek. The majority of the three-judge panel ruled in favor of the plant, deciding that "the group's motion did not follow the proper guidelines for late-filed contentions and failed to link an alleged inadequacy to a significant safety issue."

In May 2007, the state attorney general's Office, on behalf of the state Department of Environmental Protection (NJDEP), petitioned the federal Third Circuit Court of Appeals to compel the Nuclear Regulatory Commission to consider the potential for a terrorist attack as part of the criteria for Oyster Creek's licensing renewal process. In July 2007, the NJDEP faulted both Exelon and the Nuclear Regulatory Commission for relying on environmental studies that were up to 30 years old at the time of Exelon's relicensing application. The NJDEP refused to make a "positive consistency determination" for Oyster Creek, as required by the federal Coastal Zone Management Act. The positive determination is required for all applicants seeking to relicense an existing facility.

On April 8, 2009 the plant was granted a license extension to operate until April 9, 2029. This came a week after the Nuclear Regulatory Commission voted 3–1 against an appeal by anti-nuclear groups.

As of June 2009, five environmental and citizen groups were appealing the decision in the federal court. Richard Webster, attorney for the groups, claims the NRC did not have sufficient information to determine whether the plant can operate safely for the next 20 years.

“This has been the most extensive license renewal review to date, including the first adjudicatory hearing of a license renewal application,” said Eric Leeds, NRC's director of Nuclear Reactor Regulation. “The staff’s licensing and inspection scrutiny, along with the independent contributions of the ACRS, the ASLB and various citizen groups, should give the people of New Jersey added confidence that Oyster Creek will remain safe during its continued operation.”

== Closure and decommissioning ==
In December 2010, Exelon reported that Oyster Creek would close in 2019, 10 years earlier than planned, so that cooling towers would not have to be installed to meet new environmental standards. In February 2018, the closure date was adjusted to October 2018. The reactor was ultimately shut down on September 17, 2018, and its fuel was removed by September 25, 2018.

Work will now begin on dismantlement and long-term decommissioning. Oyster Creek was sold to Holtec International in July 2019 after clearing regulatory approval, and a Holtec and SNC-Lavalin joint venture called Comprehensive Decommissioning International will be responsible for decommissioning the plant. About 200 of Oyster Creek's employees will remain at the plant to carry out decommissioning work with Holtec.

== Electricity production ==
Generation (MWh) of Oyster Creek Nuclear Generating Station
Year	Jan	Feb	Mar	Apr	May	Jun	Jul	Aug	Sep	Oct	Nov	Dec	Annual (total)
2001	433,564	427,523	471,220	453,386	405,749	438,676	452,567	446,703	425,377	467,935	322,151	470,154	5,215,005
2002	473,737	422,619	471,484	432,791	455,302	441,178	446,911	439,116	426,571	94,125	453,863	473,574	5,031,271
2003	473,401	403,181	463,915	457,220	352,179	449,042	454,267	364,217	447,339	470,091	445,239	476,234	5,256,325
2004	468,817	441,925	470,564	433,876	378,355	413,985	444,850	447,543	287,988	462,856	122,953	483,600	4,857,312
2005	470,468	428,862	465,336	445,546	463,245	401,539	445,128	427,260	439,466	464,112	454,138	469,812	5,374,912
2006	393,315	335,565	464,659	451,483	365,940	439,082	441,405	424,983	413,071	185,896	261,532	467,645	4,644,576
2007	470,588	426,143	408,508	411,225	402,088	441,324	322,411	441,765	437,113	461,624	455,744	399,399	5,077,932
2008	424,201	400,430	422,238	356,828	459,296	434,294	442,550	449,651	437,727	326,548	121,372	388,870	4,664,005
2009	473,879	191,784	469,082	375,920	406,739	445,612	352,978	422,406	447,749	464,990	455,890	471,372	4,978,401
2010	472,768	426,270	464,105	405,250	433,442	433,078	427,746	449,906	437,488	460,659	-3,574	194,257	4,601,395
2011	462,729	420,667	472,427	441,659	365,920	445,206	446,626	403,411	439,618	470,365	455,628	474,191	5,298,447
2012	467,426	439,520	470,632	452,612	461,845	443,494	368,011	444,186	436,262	308,423	-3,515	425,781	4,714,677
2013	464,882	425,949	461,117	454,523	455,270	433,256	444,287	453,796	431,057	345,547	367,275	364,595	5,101,554
2014	468,949	423,080	466,779	441,407	456,609	456,509	341,593	448,316	192,732	226,347	458,565	470,021	4,850,907
2015	473,390	427,213	387,221	455,461	346,831	443,823	451,332	450,892	441,359	468,485	441,346	471,476	5,258,829
2016	470,925	441,507	468,627	359,421	283,272	443,185	447,472	429,866	242,675	274,148	377,142	346,851	4,585,091
2017	474,368	426,684	472,874	453,440	465,893	443,538	408,812	452,018	442,436	464,303	454,544	471,281	5,430,191
2018	462,083	425,864	470,380	453,710	462,664	439,334	382,807	289,886	153,587	0	--	--	3,540,315

== Environment ==
As a part of Exelon Corporation, Oyster Creek followed the corporation's environmental policy.

In August 2009, workers found and stopped two small leaks of tritium, a radioactive isotope of hydrogen with a decay half-life of about 12 years. An NRC investigation of the leak found that the levels were too low to be a danger to public health. The leaks originated from two buried pipes that had not been properly insulated when they were last worked on in 1991. A second leak was discovered in August 2009, from a pipe leading into an electrical turbine building. Tritium levels found in this leak were measured at 10 microcuries per liter of water, higher than the 5 to 6 microcuries per liter found in the earlier leak. Tritium-contaminated groundwater remained on site and had not spread to any public water supplies.

In May 2010, the New Jersey DEP announced that water from the leak had spread to a nearby aquifer, though it stated there "was no imminent danger" to water supplies. At the current rate of migration, the water was expected to reach the closest public wells within 10 to 15 years. The DEP stated there are several ways to address the problem, such as pumping out the tainted water, or injecting fresh water to force the tainted water backwards. A spokesman for Oyster Creek said they were working with the state on the issue, and have seen contamination levels steadily dropping, sometimes by "as much as 90%". Tritium causes less concern than other radioactive substances such as strontium, caesium and iodine. It does not bio-accumulate inside human tissue.

== Safety ==
Employees at the Oyster Creek nuclear power plant averaged less radiation exposure from 2005 through 2008 than workers at any other nuclear power plant of similar design in the United States.

In early May 2011, fuel supplier General Electric notified the operators of the Oyster Creek and Nine Mile Point nuclear plants regarding safety calculation errors. General Electric had made mathematical errors which could have resulted in nuclear fuel getting hotter than operators expected, reducing the plants' margin of safety. Plant operators were able to make corrections.

=== Hurricane Sandy ===
On October 30, 2012, during Hurricane Sandy, the nuclear power plant's intake structure was flooded with six and a half feet of water as a result of the storm surge from the hurricane, with no damage sustained, and at the same time the plant was already down for maintenance and lost its electrical power from the grid, so operators called an alert that escalated the plant a step up from the lowest emergency level, and turned to backup generators to keep cooling the reactor.

In following months, local residents continued to voice their worries despite a statement by Gordon K. Hunegs of the Nuclear Regulatory Commission that during Hurricane Sandy "the plant was always safe."

== Seismic risk ==
The Nuclear Regulatory Commission's estimate of the risk each year of an earthquake intense enough to cause core damage to the reactor at Oyster Creek was 1 in 71,429, according to an NRC study published in August 2010.

== Surrounding population ==
The Nuclear Regulatory Commission defines two emergency planning zones around nuclear power plants: a plume exposure pathway zone with a radius of 10 miles (16 km), concerned primarily with exposure to, and inhalation of, airborne radioactive contamination, and an ingestion pathway zone of about 50 miles (80 km), concerned primarily with ingestion of food and liquid contaminated by radioactivity.

The 2010 U.S. population within 10 miles (16 km) of Oyster Creek was 133,609, an increase of 35.8 percent in a decade, according to an analysis of U.S. Census data for msnbc.com. The 2010 U.S. population within 50 miles (80 km) was 4,482,261, an increase of 10.4 percent since 2000. Cities within 50 miles (80 km) include Atlantic City (30 miles (48 km) to city center), Toms River (10 miles (16 km) to city center), Lakewood (19 miles (31 km) to city center), Asbury Park (30 miles (48 km) to city center), and Cherry Hill (42 miles (68 km) to city center).

== Gallery ==
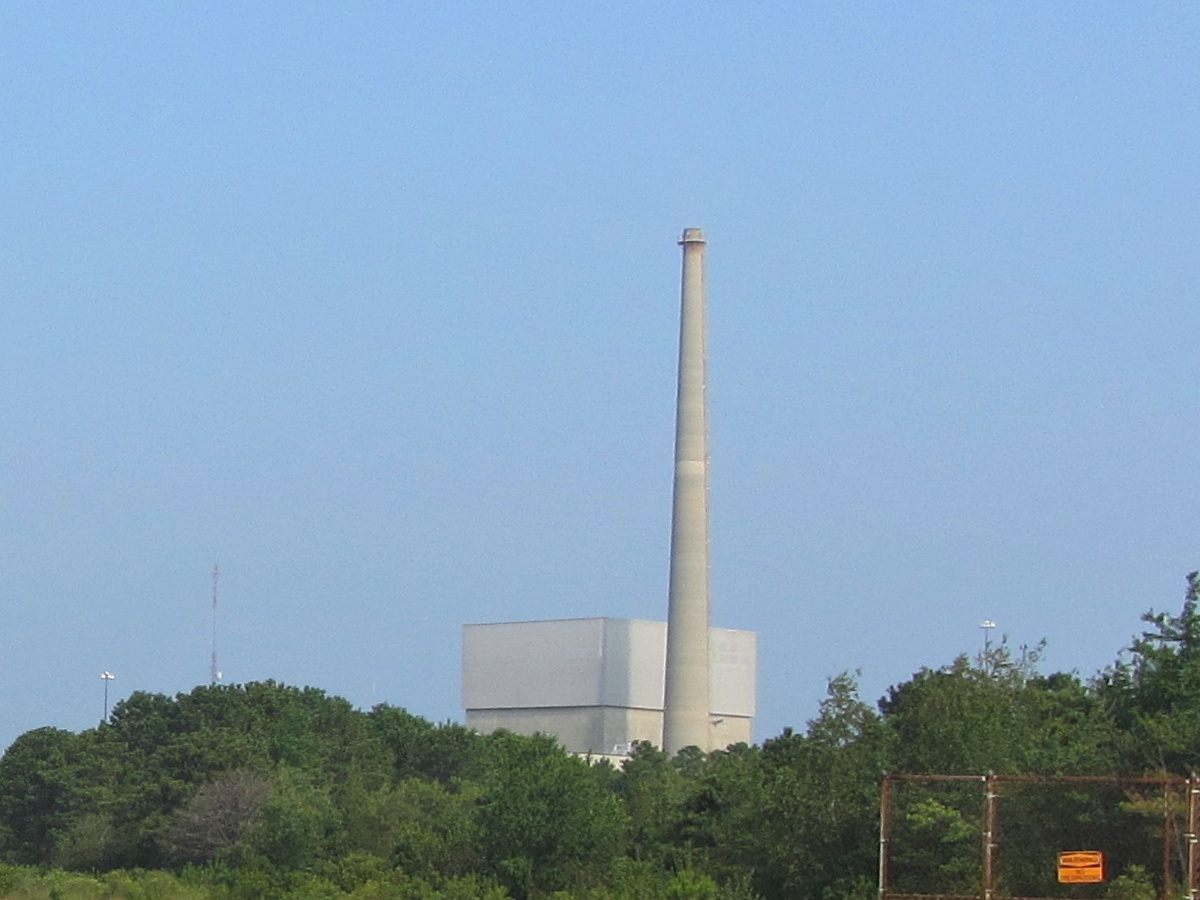
A close-up view of the Oyster Creek complex with the reactor building and off gas stack

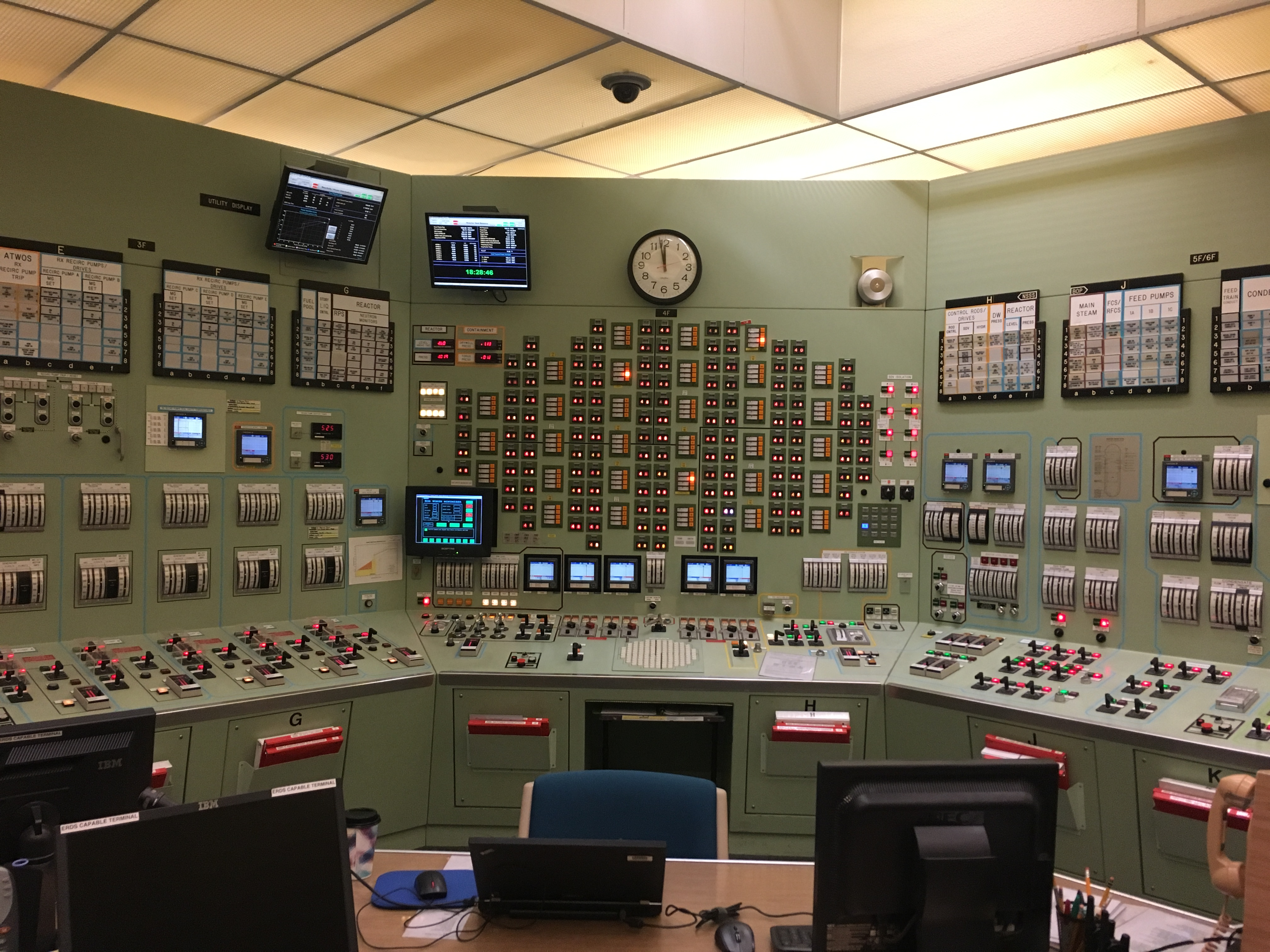
A view of the core control simulator which is an exact replica of the real core control station

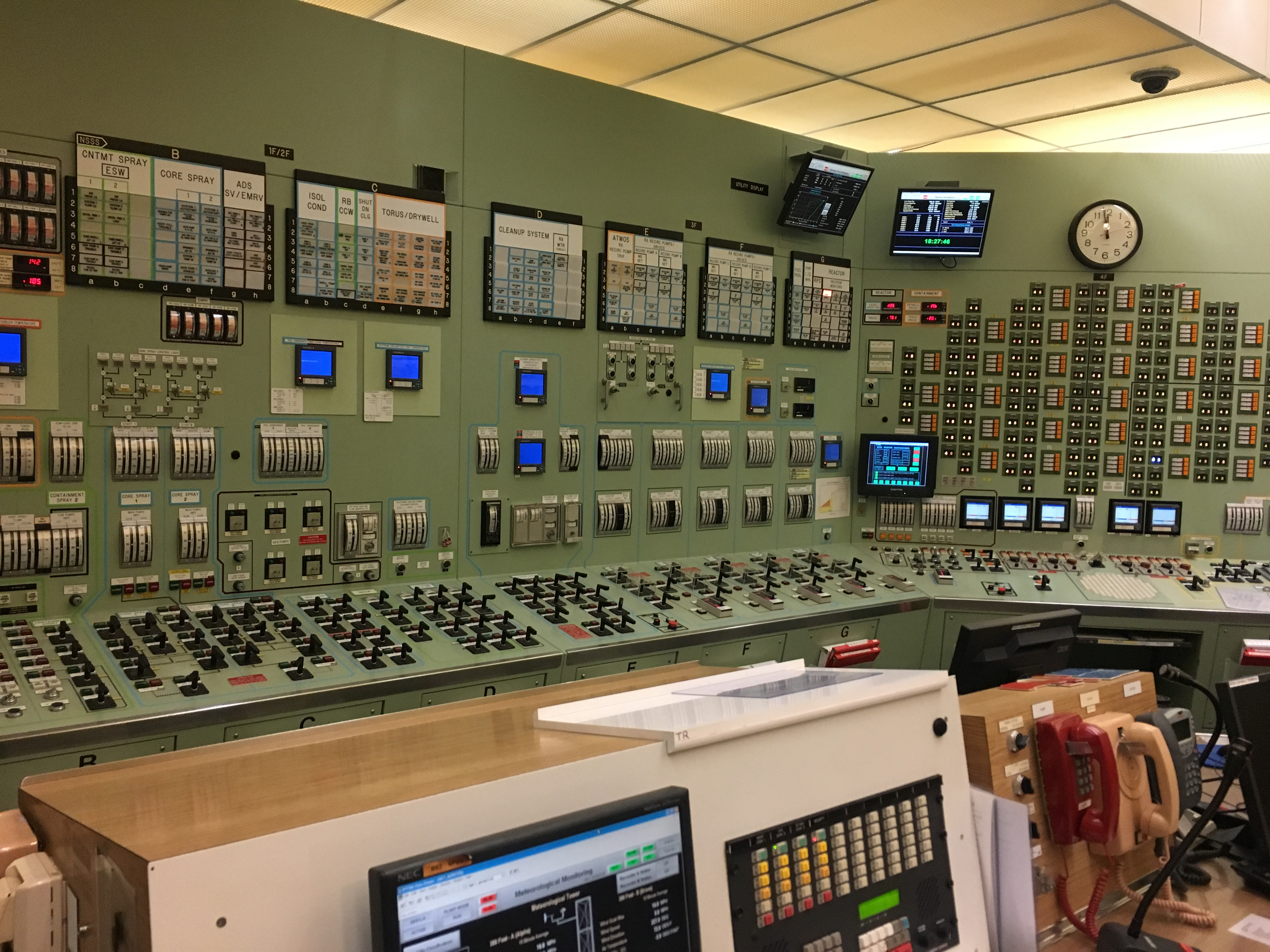
Another view of the core control simulator

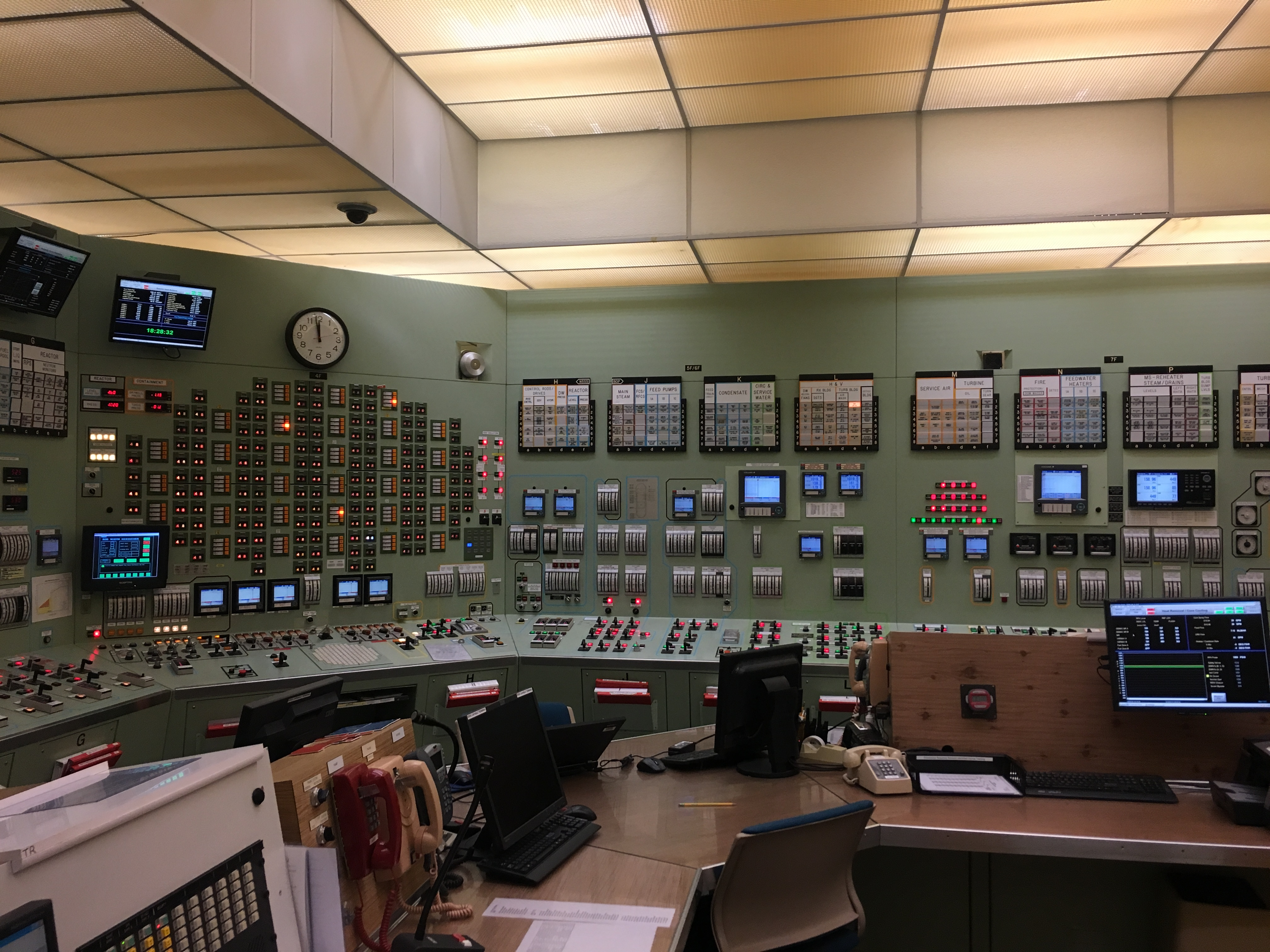
Another view of the core control simulator

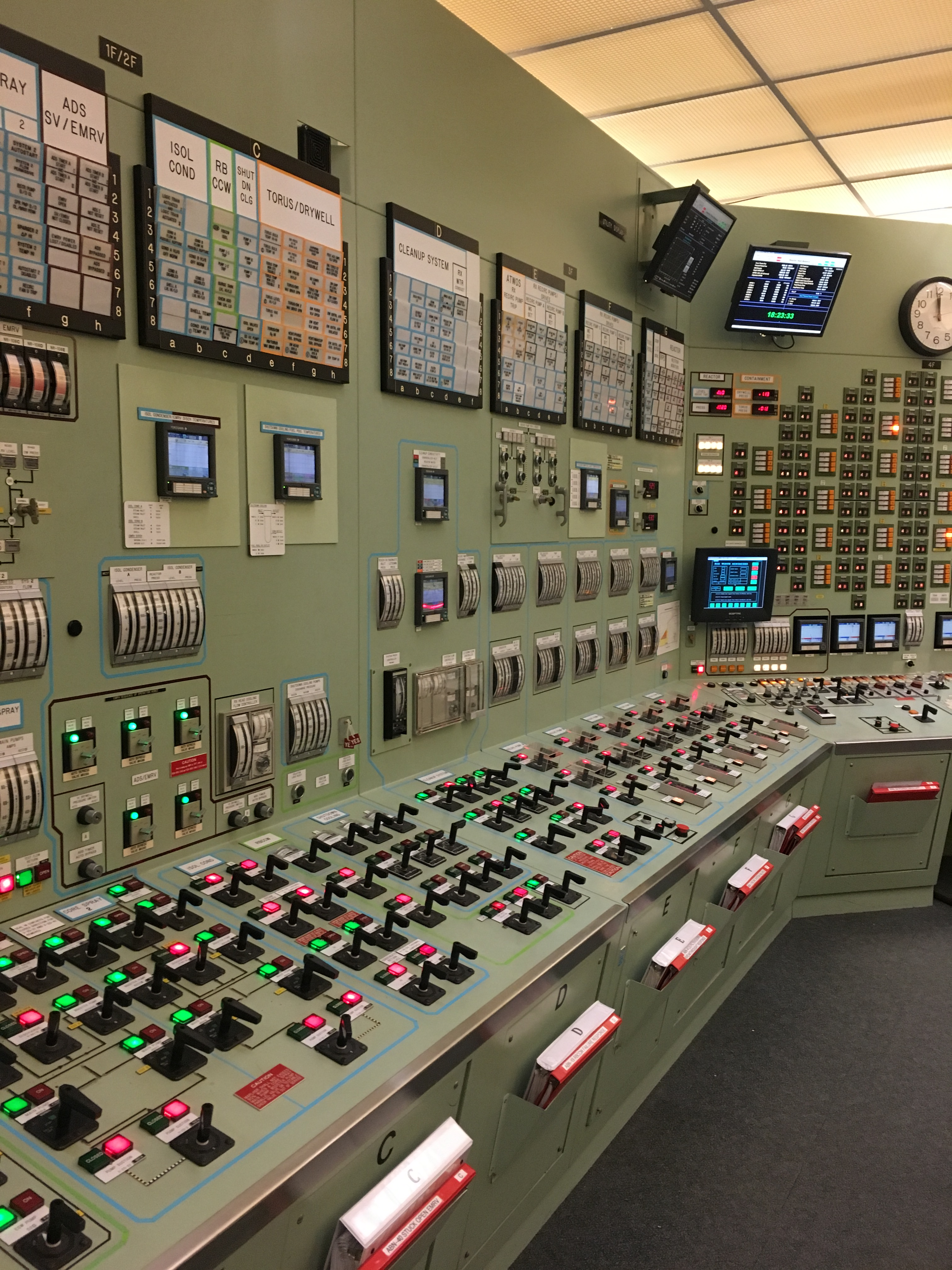
Another view of the core control simulator

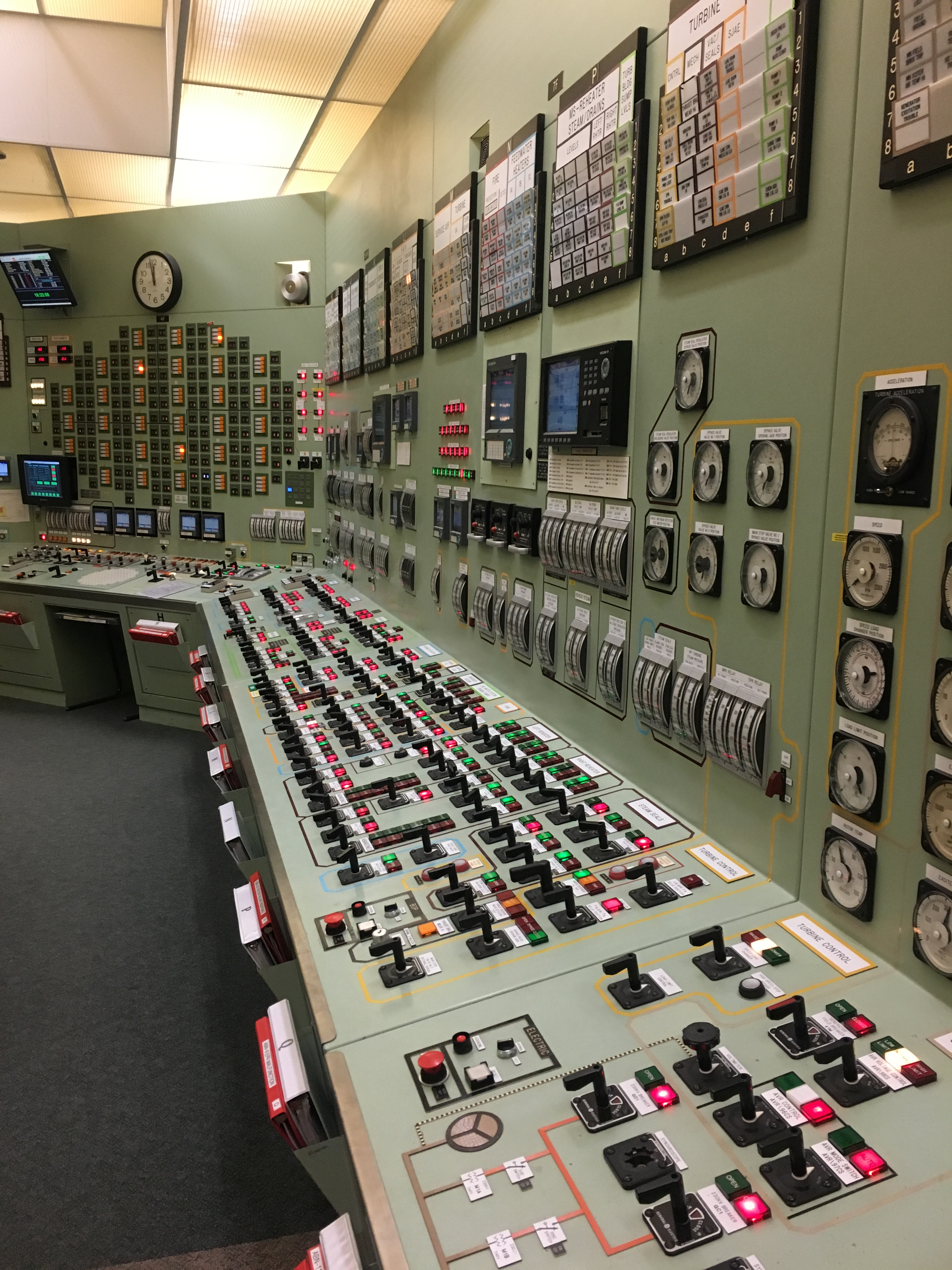
Another view of the core control simulator

== See also ==
- Anti-nuclear movement in the United States
- Nuclear power in the United States
