= List of Florida suffragists =

This is a list of Florida suffragists, suffrage groups and others associated with the cause of women's suffrage in Florida.

== Groups ==
- Florida Equal Franchise League, formed 1912.
- Florida Woman Suffrage Association, formed in January 1893.
- Men's Suffrage League of Orlando, created March 1914.
- Milton Equal Suffrage League, formed in 1914.
- National Woman's Party.
- Orlando Suffrage League, formed 1913.
- Pensacola Equal Suffrage League, created in 1914.
- Political Equality Club, created in February 1913.

== Suffragists ==
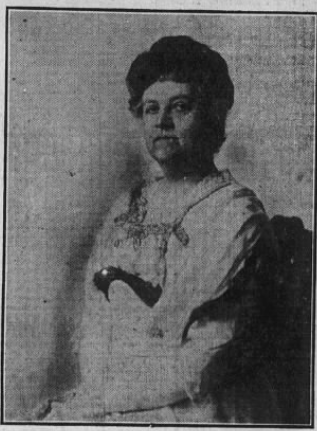
Edith Owen Stoner, May 1914

- Frances Anderson (Jacksonville).
- Blanche Armwood (Tampa).
- Elizabeth Askew (Tampa).
- Jessie M. Bartlett (St. Petersburg).
- Mary McLeod Bethune (Daytona Beach).
- Caroline Mays Brevard (Brevard County).
- Mary Elizabeth Bryan (Miami).
- Ella C. Chamberlain (Tampa).
- Roselle Cooley (Jacksonville).
- Hannah Detwiller.
- Marjory Stoneman Douglas (Miami).
- Zena Dreier (Fellsmere).
- Katherine Livingstone Eagan (Jacksonville).
- Nellie Glenn (Melrose).
- Emma Hainer (Orlando).
- May Mann Jennings.
- Mary Belle Jewett (Winter Haven).
- Minnie Kehoe.
- Mary A. Nolan (Jacksonville).
- Julia Norris (Tampa).
- Edith Owen Stoner (Jacksonville).
- Mary A. Safford (Orlando).
- John Schnarr (Orlando).
- E. Frank Sperry.
- Helen Starbuck (Orlando).
- Ivy Stranahan (Fort Lauderdale).
- Emma Tebbitts (Crescent City).
- Helen Hunt West (Jacksonville).
- Lillian C. West (Bay County).
- Eartha M. M. White (Jacksonville).

=== Politicians who supported women's suffrage ===
- James L. Giles (Orlando).
- E. F. Sperry (Orlando).

== Suffragists who campaigned in Florida ==
- Susan B. Anthony.
- Lucy Burns.
- Anne Dallas Dudley.
- Lavinia Engle.
- Margaret Foley.
- Jean Gordon.
- Kate M. Gordon.
- Louisine Havemeyer.
- Pattie R. Jacobs.
- Florence Kelley.
- Maria McMahon.
- Alice Paul.
- Anita Pollitzer.
- Jeannette Rankin.
- Anna Howard Shaw.
- Sue White.

== Anti-suffragists in Florida ==
- Frank Clark (Gainesville).

== See also ==
- Timeline of women's suffrage in Florida
- Women's suffrage in Florida
- Women's suffrage in states of the United States
- Women's suffrage in the United States
