= Women's suffrage in Florida =

U.S. state gender equality movement

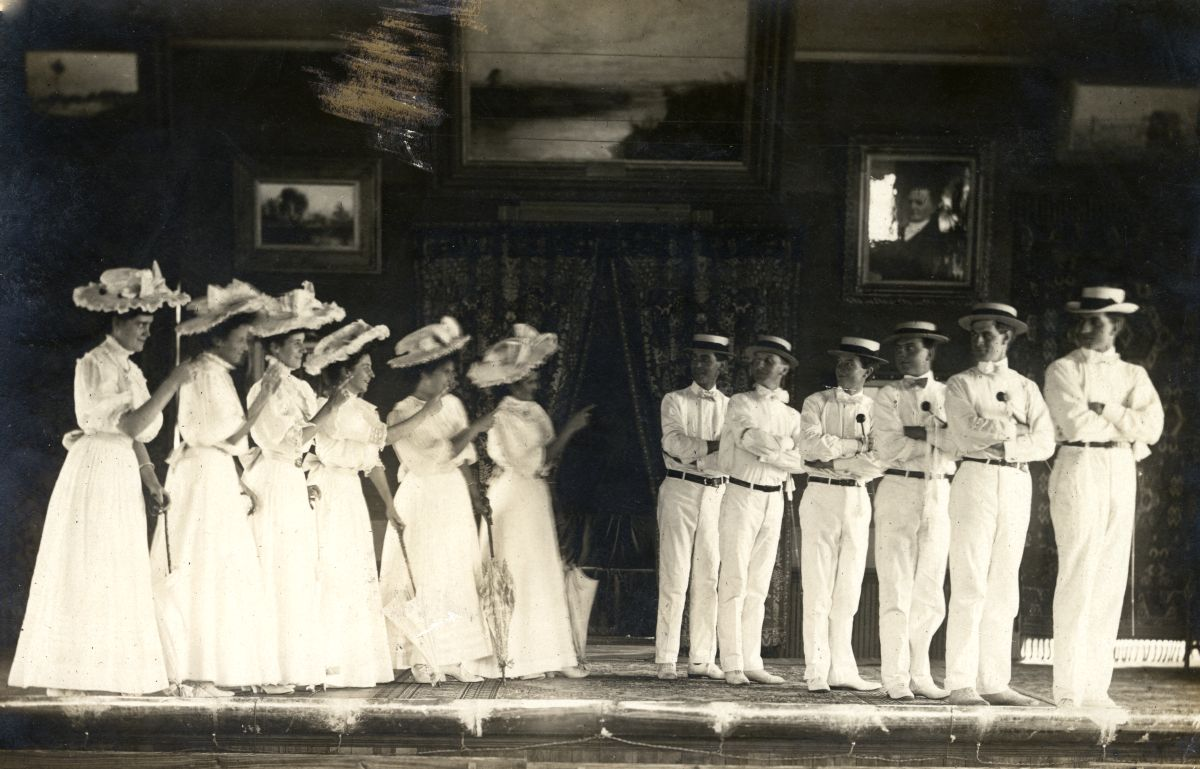
Cast from the play, "Women, Women, Women, Suffragettes, Yes," performed in 1900 by Koreshan Unity

The first women's suffrage effort in Florida was led by Ella C. Chamberlain in the early 1890s. Chamberlain began writing a women's suffrage news column, started a mixed-gender women's suffrage group and organized conventions in Florida.

After Chamberlain left Florida in 1897, most women's suffrage activities ceased until around 1912. That year, the Equal Franchise League of Florida was organized in Jacksonville, Florida. Other groups soon followed, forming around the state. Whenever the Florida Legislature was in session, suffragists advocated for equal franchise amendments to the Florida Constitution.

In October 1913, property-owning women in Orlando, Florida attempted unsuccessfully to vote. However, their actions raised awareness about women's suffrage in the state. In 1915, the city of Fellsmere allowed municipal women's suffrage and Zena Dreier became the first legal women voter in the South on June 19. By 1919, several cities in Florida allowed women to vote in municipal elections. Florida did not take action on the Nineteenth Amendment, and only ratified it years later on May 13, 1969.

== Early efforts (1890–1900) ==
After attending the Woman's Inter-State Conference held in Fall of 1892 in Des Moines, Ella C. Chamberlain returned to Florida and created a suffrage department at the Weekly Tribune in Tampa. Her suffrage column would run until 1897. Chamberlain's speech on women's suffrage in January 1893 led to the creation of a mixed-gender women's suffrage group. She became president of the group, called the Florida Woman Suffrage Association (FWSA) and which affiliated with the National Woman Suffrage Association (NWSA).

She went to the national suffrage convention as a delegate of FWSA in 1893, becoming the first person to represent Florida at one of these conventions. Chamberlain promoted women's suffrage at the Carpenter's Union in 1894. FWSA distributed literature and raised money. In 1895, a state suffrage convention was held in Tampa. Chamberlain also attended the women's suffrage convention held in Atlanta, Georgia in 1895. Despite the efforts of FWSA, they were unable to create any new chapters around the state. Suffrage work seems to have continued until 1897 when Chamberlain left Florida and no one stepped up to take her place.

== Resurgence (1910s–1920) ==
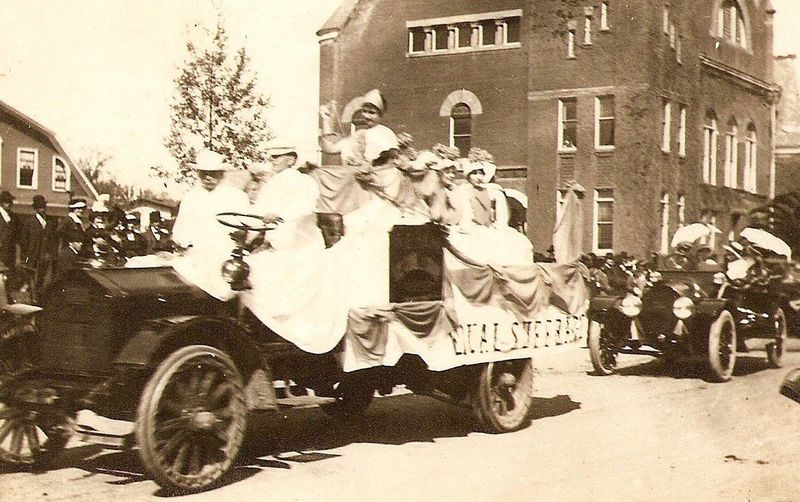
Women's suffrage car in a parade in Orlando, Florida in 1913

After Chamberlain left, women's suffrage mainly remained dormant in Florida until around 1912. One exception was a petition to the United States Congress for a federal women's suffrage amendment that was circulated by John Schnarr of Orlando in 1907.

The next women's suffrage group was founded on June 15, 1912 in Jacksonville. Katherine Livingstone Eagan, Roselle Cooley, and thirty other women met at the home of Frances Anderson on that day to create the Equal Franchise League of Florida. The group had trouble renting space for lectures, but it did secure headquarters in the offices of the Heard National Bank. The Woman's Club would not rent out space for a suffrage meeting and the Board of Trade also rejected them so the women packed suffragists into their headquarters for lectures. There was a large amount of disapproval for women's suffrage in Florida, so the Jacksonville group used the term "equal franchise" over "women's suffrage."

In February 1913 another women's suffrage group, called the Political Equality Club was formed in Lake Helen. Soon after, an Orlando Equal Franchise League was created with Mary A. Safford as president. Safford, a Unitarian minister, came to Florida in 1911 to retire. Safford and the others started to look into forming a state-wide suffrage organization. Edith Owen Stoner of Jacksonville organized the Florida delegates in the Woman Suffrage Procession.

After April 1913, Safford and Helen Starbuck went to Tallahassee to help with suffrage work in the state legislature. The Equal Suffrage League of Jacksonville had approached the Florida Legislature on passing a women's suffrage amendment to the Florida Constitution. Lawmakers wanted to know who was in favor of women's suffrage in their districts and making a statewide group would help suffragists canvass potential supporters. While in Tallahassee, Safford spoke publicly on her support for the proposed amendment to the state constitution. Jeannette Rankin was sent by the National American Woman Suffrage Association (NAWSA) to help campaign. The president of the Jacksonville Equal Suffrage League, Roselle C. Cooley, reported that the Florida House had decided to hear the suffragists' arguments. The speech given to the entire Legislature Committee of the Whole on April 25 was packed with spectators. All the seats were taken and people stood to listen to the four women and three men who testified. Rankin was one of the speakers. Weeks later, the legislature voted on the proposed amendment which did not pass.

In October 1913, the mayor of Orlando announced that "all freeholders" should register to vote in a bond election for the city. Because the mayor did not specify that the freeholders be male, several women, organized by Starbuck and Emma Hainer, attempted to register to vote for the bond election. The city clerk, Cassius Boone, refused to allow them to register. They were then referred to the mayor and the city attorney who decided that Florida law would not allow them to vote. The women had not actually expected to vote, but were using the action to draw attention to the fact that women were not allowed to vote for the government that enforced the taxes they paid. Overall, the discussion about taxation without representation for women in Orlando generated more favor for women's suffrage in the city.

In November 1913, the suffragists held their suffrage convention in Orlando at the same time as the Florida Federation of Women's Clubs held their meeting. Suffragists felt that they could use the support from the women's club. By the end of the suffrage meeting, they decided to form the Florida Equal Suffrage Association (FESA). Safford was voted the first president.

Safford was also involved in forming the Men's Equal Suffrage League of Florida in 1914. Mayor E. F. Sperry, who was also a Unitarian, served as president. Early in 1914, a well-attended women's suffrage speech given by Stoner led to interest in forming a women's suffrage group in Pensacola. Stoner's speech may have been the first women's suffrage speech made in the city, according to the Pensacola News Journal. Women in the city wrote to the National American Woman Suffrage Association (NAWSA) to help them organize a group. Lavinia Engle came to the city in March 1914. Engle was from the South, which meant that she could better connect with people in Florida. Engle went on to help organize the Milton Equal Suffrage League and then moved on to Tallahassee. Also in 1914, two special suffrage editions of local newspapers were produced in Jacksonville and Pensacola. Newspaper columnist Lillian C. West also wrote about women's suffrage in several local papers.

The Florida Legislature again considered women's suffrage in 1915. The Pensacola Equal Suffrage League worked to get 1,500 signatures in favor of the women's suffrage amendment in the state legislature. Other suffrage groups campaigned, raised money and participated in parades throughout the state in 1915. The bill did not pass. However, the legislature created the municipality of Fellsmere and did not specify that only males could vote in the city. On June 19, 1915, Zena Dreier legally voted and became the first woman to vote in the South.

Most Florida suffrage groups also had classes where they studied history and citizenship. The Florida Federation of Women's Clubs (FFWC) formally endorsed women's suffrage that year. Several more chapters of the Men's Leagues were organized in 1915. Suffragists reported in 1916 at the state convention that they had distributed thousands of pieces of literature and written around fifteen hundred letters to advocate for women's suffrage.

In April 1917, the suffrage groups worked to get another women's suffrage amendment passed in the state legislature. Mary Baird Bryan testified in favor of the bill in front of the Legislature. The bill passed the Florida Senate by 23 to 7 on April 23. Several members of the Florida House spoke in favor of women's suffrage. The bill did not receive the necessary three-fifth majority to pass.

Alice Paul visited Florida in May 1917 to recruit members for the National Woman's Party (NWP) and form a chapter. Florida NWP member, Mary A. Nolan, was arrested in November 1917 for picketing outside the White House. She was sentenced to six days in jail and went to the Occoquan Workhouse. Nolan was one of the oldest suffragists picketing with the NWP. She was later arrested several times in 1919 while involved with Watchfire demonstrations. Nolan later traveled with the Prison Special which stopped in Jacksonville in February 1919.

In 1918, during a special legislative session, several local bills passed providing municipal suffrage for women in Aurantia, Daytona, Daytona Beach, DeLand, and Orange City. Other cities that received charters for municipal women's suffrage in Florida were Clearwater, Cocoa, Delray, Dunedin, Florence Villa, Fort Lauderdale, Miami, Moore Haven, Orlando, St. Petersburg, and Tarpon Springs.

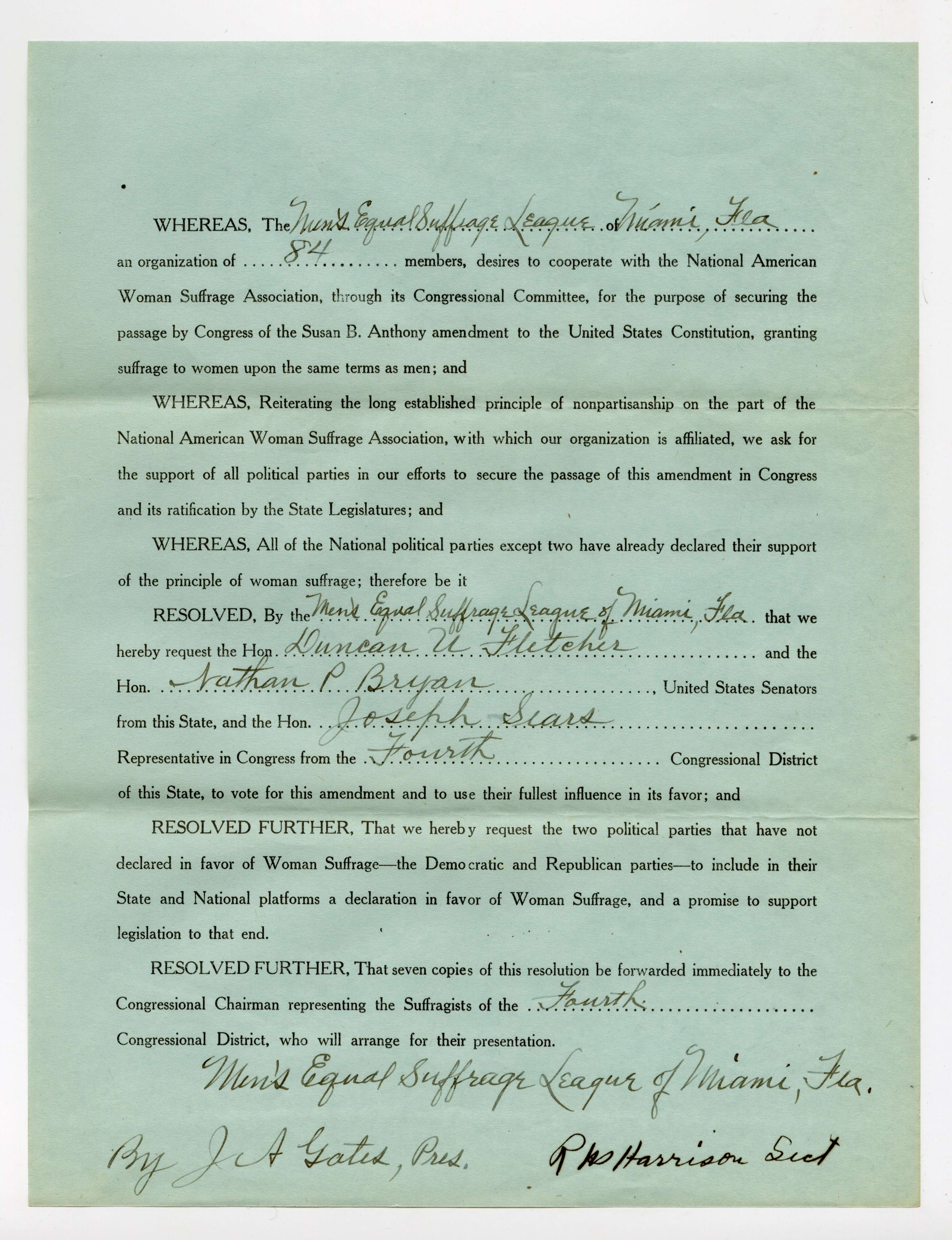
Resolution in Favor of the Nineteenth Amendment from the Men's Equal Suffrage League of Miami, Florida (1916)

During the 1919 legislative session in April, there was action on another women's suffrage amendment to the state constitution. This measure did not pass and was voted against early in the session. When the Nineteenth Amendment was about to go out to the states for ratification, Governor Sidney Johnston Catts urged Florida lawmakers to become the first state to ratify. Later, he did not call the legislature back into session. Catts didn't believe it would pass the Florida Legislature at that time. Suffragists believed that having the first vote on the amendment would have caused problems for ratification efforts in other states.

After the Nineteenth Amendment was ratified, women were able to register to vote in state and federal elections. On September 7, 1920, Helen Hunt West of Duval County became the first women in Florida to register under the new rules. Hunt West continued to work to get Florida to ratify the Nineteenth Amendment for the rest of her life. Florida didn't ratify the Nineteenth Amendment until May 13, 1969.

== Anti-suffragism in Florida ==
One Florida state representative, L. C. O'Neal, argued that giving women the right to vote would lower them "from the exalted position which they now held." Other men did not believe that women were equal to men in their ability to vote in the same way that women differed from men physically. Others, like Representative Frank Clark from Gainesville used quotations from the Bible to justify the idea that women should have different gender roles from men. Clark insisted that women should only act as their husbands instructed them.

It was also argued that women's suffrage was a "Northern" idea, and therefore as people living in the South, they should reject the arguments for it. Representatives in the Florida House pointed out that giving women the vote would also mean that African-American women would vote. They believed this would lead to a "train of evils." Representative Clark also conflated socialism in his racist reasoning against allowing women to vote. He believed that allowing women to vote would be a slippery slope that would lead to more Black people voting, women's character becoming degraded, and "destroy the American home."

== See also ==
- List of Florida suffragists
- Timeline of women's suffrage in Florida
- Women's suffrage in states of the United States
- Women's suffrage in the United States
