= Timeline of women's suffrage in Florida =

This is a timeline of women's suffrage in Florida. Ella C. Chamberlain began women's suffrage efforts in Florida starting in 1892. However, after Chamberlain leaves the state in 1897, suffrage work largely ceases until the next century. More women's suffrage groups are organized, with the first in the twentieth century being the Equal Franchise League in Jacksonville, Florida in 1912. Additional groups are created around Florida, including a Men's Equal Suffrage League of Florida. Suffragists lobby the Florida Legislature for equal suffrage, hold conventions, and educate voters. Several cities in Florida pass laws allowing women to vote in municipal elections, with Fellsmere being the first in 1915. Zena Dreier becomes the first woman to legally cast a vote in the South on June 19, 1915. On May 26, 1919, women in Orlando vote for the first time. After the passage of the Nineteenth Amendment, Helen Hunt West becomes the first woman in Florida to register to vote under equal franchise rules on September 7, 1920. Florida does not ratify the Nineteenth Amendment until May 13, 1969.

== 19th century ==
=== 1890s ===
1892

- Fall: Ella C. Chamberlain starts a suffrage newspaper column in Tampa.

1893

- January: The Florida Woman Suffrage Association (FWSA) is formed.

1894

- Chamberlain addressed the Carpenters' Union in Florida two times and distributed literature.
- FWSA holds a successful suffrage bazaar to raise money.

1895

- January: A state suffrage convention is held in Tampa.

1897

- Chamberlain leaves Florida and women's suffrage remains dormant for some time.

== 20th century ==
=== 1900s ===
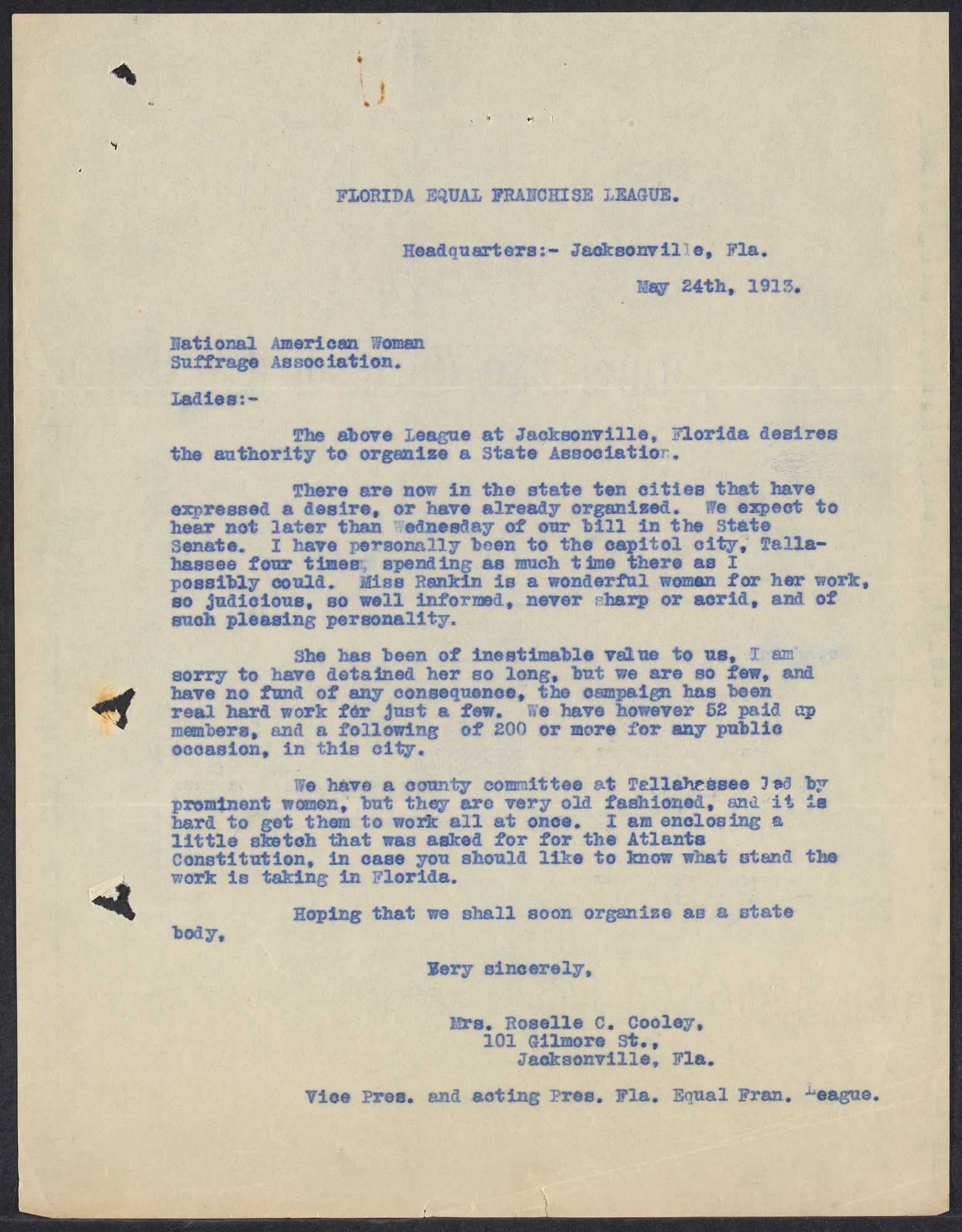
Correspondence regarding the Florida Equal Franchise League, May 24, 1913

1907

- John Schnarr of Orlando circulates a women's suffrage petition for a federal amendment.

=== 1910s ===
1912

- June 15: The Equal Franchise League of Jacksonville is formed.

1913

- February 13: The Political Equality Club of Lake Helen is organized.
- February 27: The Equal Suffrage Club of Orlando is formed.
- March 3: Florida women march in the Woman Suffrage Procession.
- April: Equal Franchise League of Jacksonville asks the Florida Legislature to pass a women's suffrage amendment for the state constitution. The bill does not pass.
- October: Several women in Orlando attempt to register to vote.
- November: State suffrage convention takes place at the same time as the Florida Federation of Woman's Clubs meeting. The Florida Equal Suffrage Association (FESA) is formed.

1914

- The Men's Equal Suffrage League of Florida is formed.
- The Pensacola Equal Suffrage League and the Milton Equal Suffrage League are formed.
- December 8–10: Equal suffrage convention is held in Pensacola. Pattie Ruffner Jacobs speaks at this convention.
- July 3: The Equal Franchise League of Jacksonville edited a special suffrage edition of the State.
- September: The Pensacola Equal Suffrage League edits a special edition of the Pensacola Journal.

1915

- February 3: Equal suffrage convention held in Orlando.
- March: Anna Howard Shaw visits Winter Haven and gives several suffrage talks there and later in Pensacola.
- June 19 : Zena Dreier in Fellsmere becomes the first woman in the South to vote in an election.
- The Florida Federation of Women's Clubs (FFWC) endorses women's suffrage.
- A women's suffrage bill is considered by the State Legislature, but does not pass.

1916

- March 15–16: Equal suffrage convention held in Miami.

1917

- April: Another effort to pass a women's suffrage bill is taken up, but eventually fails in the State Legislature.
- May: A Florida chapter of the National Woman's Party (NWP) is organized after Alice Paul visits.
- November 10: Mary A. Nolan of Jacksonville is arrested for picketing the White House.
- November 15: Nolan is present for the Night of Terror.
- November 20: Women's suffrage convention held in Tampa. Jacobs speaks again at this convention.

1918

- November: Special legislative session considers drafting a resolution in support of the United States Congress to pass a federal suffrage amendment. It does not pass. Bills providing municipal suffrage for women in Aurantia, Daytona, Daytona Beach, DeLand, and Orange City pass.
- November 19: State suffrage convention held in Daytona.

1919

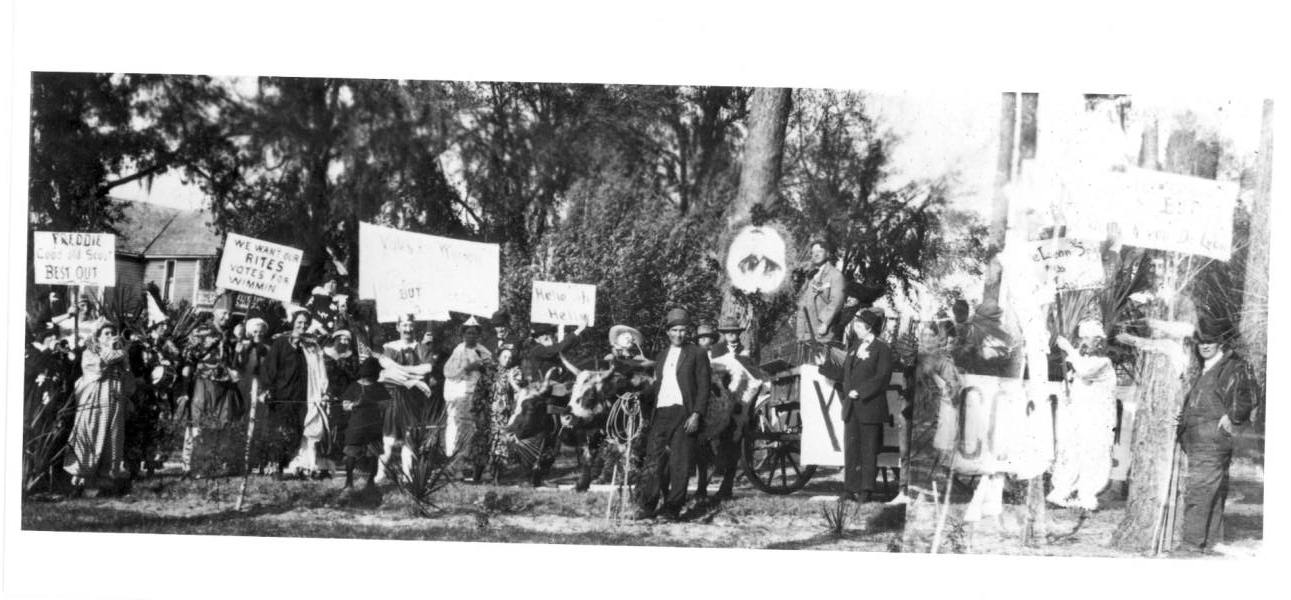
Demonstration probably against women's suffrage in De Leon Springs, Florida, March 17, 1917

- January: James L. Giles, mayor of Orlando, requests an amendment to the city charter to allow women to vote and it is passed by City Council.
- January: Shaw visits Florida and raises money for the suffrage effort.
- February 18–19: The Prison Special visits Jacksonville.
- March: Winter Park, Florida aldermen request municipal suffrage for women in the city.
- April: A Primary Suffrage bill is promoted and considered in the Florida Legislature.
- May 26: Orlando women vote for the first time.
- July: Women in Winter Park vote for the first time.
- October: Florida women's suffrage convention meets in Tampa.

=== 1920s ===
1920

- September 7: Helen Hunt West becomes the first woman in Florida to register to vote with full suffrage rights.

1921

- The Florida Equal Franchise League dissolves and forms into the League of Women Voters of Florida.

1924

- The Indian Citizenship Act is passed, giving Native Americans citizenship in the United States.

=== 1960s ===
1965

- The Voting Rights Act is passed, preventing disenfranchisement of African-American and Native-American women.

1969

- May 13: Florida ratifies the Nineteenth Amendment.

== See also ==
- List of Florida suffragists
- Women's suffrage in Florida
- Women's suffrage in states of the United States
- Women's suffrage in the United States
