= Solar power in Washington, D.C. =

Solar energy in the District of Columbia, United States

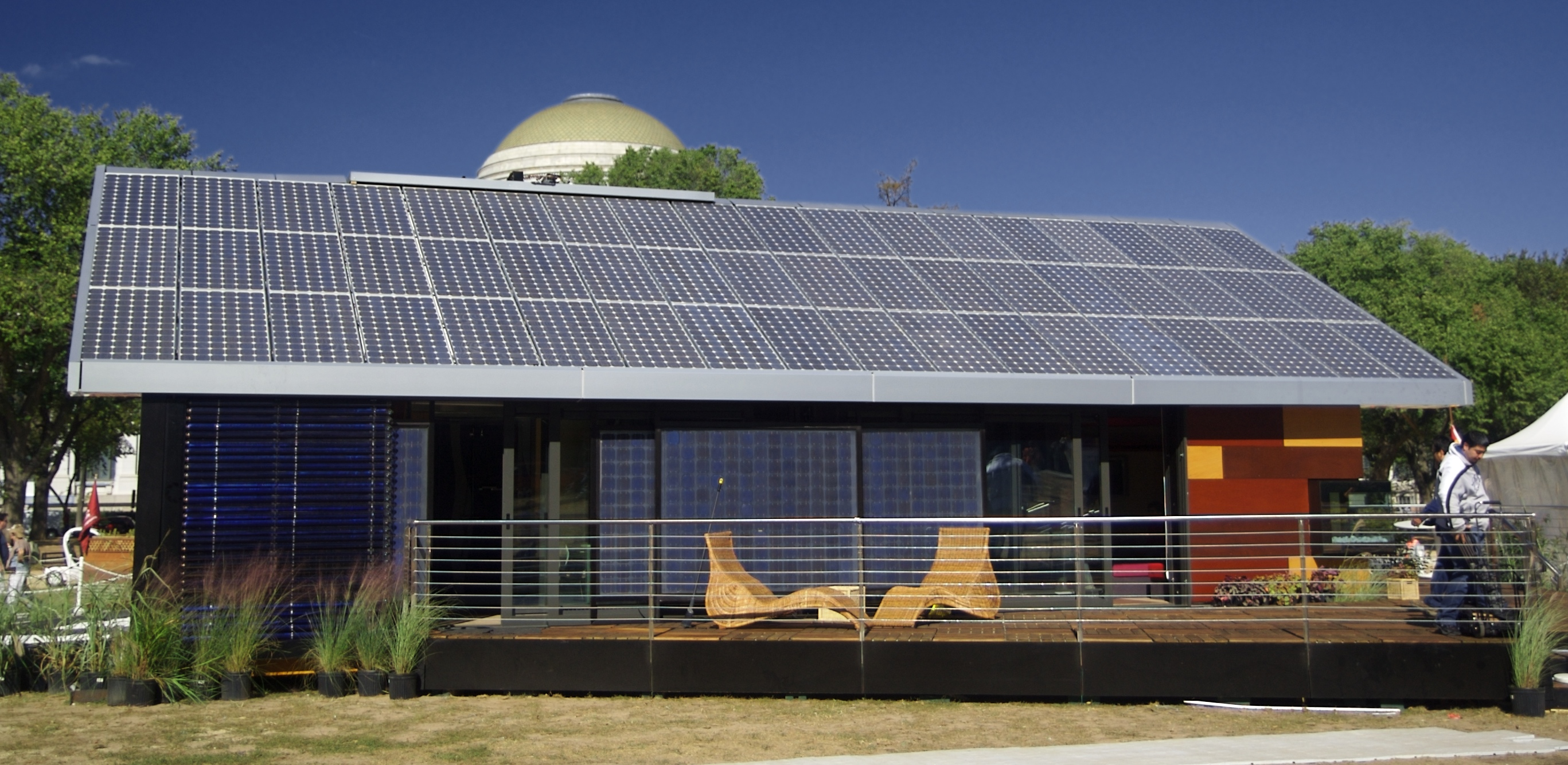
Solar Decathlon house on the National Mall

As of 2023, Washington, D.C. has 237 MW of installed solar power. The District of Columbia has a renewable portfolio standard of 100% renewable energy by 2032, with a carve-out for 10% of local solar power by 2041.

The District's largest solar system is a 7.5 MW project at Catholic University of America. Joint Base Anacostia–Bolling has a 7 MW installation.

Every two years a Solar Decathlon is held on the National Mall. Contestants are challenged to build an energy efficient building that is capable of generating all of the energy used. In 2013 the Solar Decathlon was held outside Washington, D.C. for the first time, and was located in Orange County.

There are 219 community solar facilities as of the end of 2021.

== The Mount Pleasant Solar Cooperative and DC SUN ==
In 2006, Mount Pleasant residents Anya Schoolman and George Musser's sons Walter and Diego watched Al Gore's documentary, An Inconvenient Truth and suggested that their families do something about the climate change problem. Upon investigating the possibility of going solar, Schoolman found the problems of building code, financial and contracting issues too complex to be solved by a single person. Schoolman, Musser and their two sons formed the Mount Pleasant Solar Cooperative to bring greater time, expertise, lobbying and buying power to the problem. In 2009, 45 houses in Mount Pleasant went solar. That number has since grown to about 250. Soon a Capitol Hill Solar Co-op was calling seeking Mount Pleasant's expertise. Eventually there were solar coops in every ward in the District. In 2010, the eleven neighborhood solar coops of Washington, DC formed an umbrella organization, DC Solar United Neighborhoods (DC SUN). The SUN model has begun spreading to additional states, including Maryland and Virginia. In 2011, Schoolman founded the Solar United Neighbors (then called Community Power Network), a nonprofit organization bringing together the efforts of local renewable energy groups. As of May 2019, Solar United Neighbors is active in 12 U.S. states.

Anya Schoolman and the Mount Pleasant Solar Cooperative were the subject of a segment in M. Sanjayan's Discovery Channel series Powering The Future and have been recognized by the White House's Champions of Change program.

== Availability ==
Insolation is good at about 4.7 sun hours/day.

== Installed capacity ==
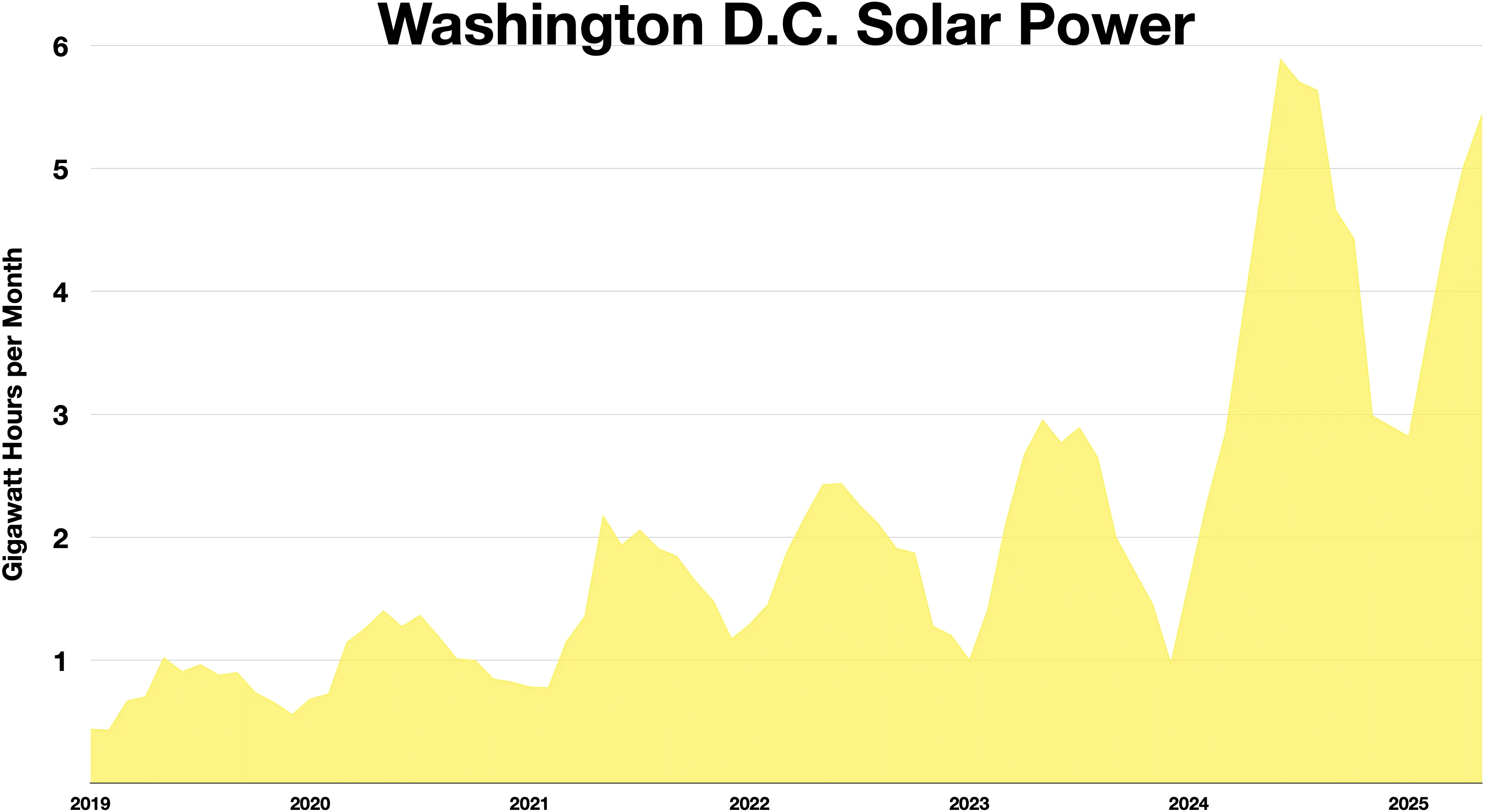
Washington, DC solar power

Grid-connected PV capacity (MW)
Year	Capacity	Installed	% change
2007	0.5		
2008	0.7	0.2	40%
2009	1.0	0.3	43%
2010	4.5	3.5	350%
2011	11.6	7.2	158%
2012	13.9	2.3	20%
2013	16.5	2.6	19%
2014	19.5	3.0	18%
2015	27.0	7.5	38%
2016	43.5	16.5	61%
2017	59.0	15.5	36%
2018	83.3	24.3	41%
2019	90.8	17.5	9%
2020	107.7	16.9	19%
2021	174.0	66.3	%
2022	206.0	32.0	%

== See also ==
- Solar power in the United States
- Renewable energy in the United States
