= AVC =

AVC may refer to:

== Organizations ==
- Asian Volleyball Confederation, the continental governing body for the sport of volleyball in Asia
- Asia Vital Components, computer fan manufacturer
- Advanced Video Communications, a company specializing in internet video streaming technologies
- ¡Alfaro Vive, Carajo!, a defunct left-wing group in Ecuador
- American Viscose Corporation, a former maker of rayon and other synthetic fibers
- Antelope Valley College, a community college in Lancaster, California
- Association of Vineyard Churches, a Protestant Christian denomination based in North America
- Atlantic Veterinary College, on Prince Edward Island, Canada
- Bureau of Arms Control, Verification, and Compliance, a bureau within the U.S. Department of State

== Technology ==
- Advanced Video Coding (a.k.a. H.264), a digital video compression format
- Access vector cache, in implementations of Security-Enhanced Linux
- Aluminum vehicle carrier, a type of autorack, a railroad freight car
- Automated vehicle classification
- Automatic volume control, a way of compensating for fading of radio signals
- A US Navy hull classification symbol: Seaplane catapult, light (AVC)

== Other uses ==
- Ab urbe condita or Anno urbis conditae, Latin for "from the founding of the city" (of Rome), used for dates
- Assurance of voluntary compliance, in the United States, a legal device
- Atrioventricular canal, in the heart
- Average variable cost, a metric used in economics
