= List of places in Florida: A =

This list of current cities, towns, unincorporated communities, counties, and other recognized places in the U.S. state of Florida also includes information on the number and names of counties in which the place lies, and its lower and upper zip code bounds, if applicable.

Name of place	Number of counties	Counties	Lower zip code	Upper zip code
Aberdeen	1	Palm Beach		
Abe Springs	1	Calhoun		
Acacia Villas	1	Palm Beach		
Achan	1	Polk		
Acline	1	Charlotte	33950	
Acres of Diamond	1	Brevard	32901	
Acron	1	Lake		
Acton	1	Polk		
Adams	1	Hamilton		
Adams Beach	1	Taylor		
Adamsville	1	Hillsborough	33534	
Adamsville	1	Sumter		
Agricola	1	Polk		
Agrock	1	Polk		
Airgate	1	Manatee	33580	
Airline	1	Lafayette		
Airport Mail Facility	1	Miami-Dade	33122	
Airport Siding	1	Duval	32229	
Alachua	1	Alachua	32615	
Aladdin City	1	Miami-Dade	33030	
Alafaya	1	Orange		
Alafia	1	Hillsborough	33566	
Alamana	1	Volusia		
Alameda	1	Miami-Dade	33144	
Alaqua	1	Walton	32433	
Alcoma	1	Polk		
Alderene Park	1	Seminole		
Alderman	1	Hernando		
Alderman Park	1	Duval	32211	
Aldridge	1	Duval		
Alert	1	Polk		
Alexander Springs	1	Lake		
Alford	1	Jackson	32420	
Allandale	1	Volusia	32119	
Allanton	1	Bay	32401	
Allapattah	1	Miami-Dade	33142	
Allen	1	Clay		
Allenhurst	1	Brevard		
Allentown	1	Santa Rosa	32570	
Alliance	1	Calhoun		
Alliance	1	Jackson	32446	
Alligator Lake	1	Osceola	32769	
Alligator Point	1	Franklin		
Alligator Point Marina	1	Franklin	32327	
Alma	1	Jefferson		
Aloma	1	Orange	32792	
Alpine	1	Highlands		
Alpine Heights	1	Walton		
Altamonte Mall	1	Seminole	32701	
Altamonte Springs	1	Seminole	32701	16
Alta Vista	1	Charlotte	33950	
Altha	1	Calhoun	32421	
Alton	1	Lafayette	32066	
Altoona	1	Lake	32702	
Altschul	1	Gadsden	32333	
Alturas	1	Polk	33820	
Alys Beach	1	Walton	32461	
Alva	1	Lee	33920	
Amelia City	1	Nassau	32034	
Amelia Island	1	Nassau	32034	
Amelia Island Plantation	1	Nassau		
American Beach	1	Nassau	32034	
Amherst	1	Brevard		
Anastasia	1	St. Johns	32084	
Anclote	2	Pasco, Pinellas	33589	
Anclote Acres	1	Pasco	33531	
Andalusia	1	Flagler	32010	
Andover	1	Miami-Dade		
Andover Golf Estates	1	Miami-Dade	33169	
Andover Lakes	1	Orange		
Andover Lakes Estates	1	Miami-Dade	33169	
Andrews	1	Levy		
Andrews	1	Nassau		
Andytown	1	Broward		
Angel City	1	Brevard	32952	
Angler Park	1	Monroe	33037	
Anglers Park	1	Monroe		
Ankona	1	St. Lucie	33452	
Anna Maria	1	Manatee	34216	
Anona	1	Pinellas	33540	
Anthony	1	Marion	32617	
Antioch	1	Hillsborough	33566	
Apache Shores	1	Citrus		
Apalachee Correctional Institution	1	Jackson	32324	
Apalachee Ridge	1	Leon		
Apalachicola	1	Franklin	32320	
Apix	1	Martin		
Apollo Beach	1	Hillsborough	33572	
Apopka	1	Orange	32703	
Aqui Esta	1	Charlotte		
Araguey Park	1	St. Johns	32084	
Araquey	1	St. Johns		
Arbuckle	1	Highlands		
Arcadia	1	DeSoto	33821	
Archbold	1	Highlands		
Arch Creek	1	Miami-Dade	33153	
Archer	1	Alachua	32618	
Ardley	1	Palm Beach		
Ards Crossroads	1	Holmes		
Argyle	1	Walton	32422	
Ariel	1	Volusia		
Aripeka	2	Hernando, Pasco	33502	
Arlington	1	Citrus		
Arlington	1	Duval	32211	
Arlington Green	1	Duval	32211	
Arlington Heights	1	Duval	32211	
Arlington Park	1	Broward	33441	
Arlington Towers	1	Broward		
Arlingwood	1	Duval	32211	
Armament Development and Test Center	1	Okaloosa	32542	
Armour	1	Polk		
Armston	1	Pinellas		
Armstrong	1	St. Johns	32033	
Arran	1	Wakulla	32327	
Arrant Settlement	1	Holmes		
Arredondo	1	Alachua		
Artesia	1	Brevard		
Arundel	1	Martin		
Asbury Lake	1	Clay		
Ashmore	1	Wakulla		
Ashton	1	Osceola	32769	
Ashville	1	Jefferson	32331	
Astatula	1	Lake	32705	
Astor	1	Lake	32102	
Astor Farms	1	Seminole		
Astor Park	1	Lake	32002	
Astoria Park	1	Leon		
Astronaut Trail	1	Brevard	32796	
Athena	1	Taylor	32347	
Atlantic Beach	1	Duval	32233	
Atlantic Boulevard Estates	1	Duval	32211	
Atlantic Heights	1	Miami-Dade	33139	
Atlantis	1	Palm Beach	33462	
Auburn	1	Okaloosa	32536	
Auburndale	1	Polk	33823	
Aucilla	1	Jefferson	32344	
Audubon	1	Brevard	32952	
Aurantia	1	Brevard	32780	
Aurora	1	Brevard		
Auxiliary Field No. 9	1	Okaloosa	32544	
Avalon	1	Santa Rosa		
Avalon Beach	1	Santa Rosa	32570	
Avalon Park	1	Orange		
Ave Maria	1	Collier		
Aventura	1	Miami-Dade	33160	
Avoca	1	Hamilton		
Avon by the Sea	1	Brevard		
Avondale	1	Duval	32204	
Avon Park	1	Highlands	33825	
Avon Park Air Force Range	1	Highlands	33825	
Avon Park Lakes	1	Highlands	33825	
Ayers	1	Hernando		
Azalea Park	1	Orange	32807	
Azalea Terrace	1	Duval	32216	

== See also ==
- Florida
- List of municipalities in Florida
- List of former municipalities in Florida
- List of counties in Florida
- List of census-designated places in Florida
