= Senator Herndon =

Senator Herndon may refer to:

- Benjamin Herndon (1748–1819), North Carolina State Senate
- Judith Herndon (1941–1980), West Virginia State Senate
