= League of Women Voters of Florida =

American nonpartisan civic organization

- Founded: 1939
- Founder: Carrie Chapman Catt
- Type: Political advocacy
- Purpose: Political action, responsible government
- Location: Tallahassee, Florida
- Key people: Jessica Lowe-Minor (President)
- Website: www.lwvfl.org

The League of Women Voters of Florida (LWVFL) is a civic organization in the state of Florida. The organization is nonpartisan; the League's Bylaws mandate that the organization will not support any political candidate or party. League promotes political responsibility through informed and active participation of citizens in government, acts on selected governmental issues, and influences public policy through education and advocacy.

== History ==
The Florida State League of Women Voters was founded on March 31, 1921 by May Mann Jennings, at a meeting in Jacksonville. It immediately voted to affiliate with the national League of Women Voters, although unlike the national organization and the Leagues in other states, the FSLWV was not the successor of a suffrage organization. In the 1920s the FSLWV included many of the most prominent women in the state and was a strongly feminist movement, with women's issues at the top of its priorities. The first president of the league was Nellie Healy O'Hara of Lake Worth, Florida.

Following a decline in the 1930s, the organization was reorganized in 1939 first as the Florida Non-Partisan League of Women Voters, subsequently renamed the League of Women Voters of Florida. Its first project was a study of state government with a particular focus on the state's Constitution. In 1949, the League worked to pass the 1949 permissive jury service statute. Prior to 1949 and the work done by the LWVFL, women in Florida could not serve on juries.

Early advocacy efforts encouraged the Florida Legislature to end the process of gerrymandering. In 2011, Florida voters approved two gerrymandering-related redistricting amendments which were placed in the State Constitution. The LWVFL and other groups sued over the redistricting. In addition, the LWVFL suspended voter registration operations for a year during that time, and when the gerrymandering aspects of the provision were blocked by a federal judge. The gerrymandering was ruled unconstitutional in Florida since it strongly favored one party over another. In 2012, the group worked again to register voters, this time with a five-week deadline. The LWVFL continued to monitor district maps and redistricting. The LWVFL also fought against a 2012 proposal to purge voting rolls which then President Deirdre Macnab called an effort to "disproportionately impact minority voters and erroneously disenfranchise those that are eligible."

== Modern League ==
More than twenty nine local Leagues statewide hold candidate forums, issue election year Voters Guides, and sponsor public seminars. As of 2025 Jessica Lowe-Minor is the current president of the League of Women Voters of Florida. The Board of Directors for the Florida League includes Barbara Lanning, first vice president; Cynthia Griffin Cave, second vice president; Dr. Monica Elliot, treasurer; Shayna Rich, secretary; and four additional directors.

LWVFL encourages civic engagement and is strictly nonpartisan, though it has been accused of partisanship. LWVFL it works to encourage participation in government, increase understanding in policy's and advocate for policy changes that positively impact the public. The LWVFL also works with the non-partisan VoteRiders organization to spread state-specific information on voter ID requirements.

LWVFL has engaged in a number of statewide and local projects, including recommending the initiation of a recycling program in St. Petersburg; supporting the Central Florida commuter rail network SunRail; endorsing a court case which ended voter purges held 90 days before a federal election; striking down of restrictions on volunteer voter registration efforts; the re-institution of early voting days and early voting on the Sunday before election day; and the redrawing of both congressional and state legislative district lines after extensive litigation. As a result of that litigation, new district maps were implemented for the 2016 elections. It has lobbied for gun safety for years, but after the 2016 shooting at the Pulse nightclub in Orlando, the group became a driving force in a statewide initiative to establish stricter gun safety guidelines through the Florida Coalition to Prevent Gun Violence. In 2016, the LWVF hosted a screening of the documentary about gun violence, Making a Killing: Guns, Greed and the NRA.

== See also ==
- Elections in Florida
  - Category:2024 elections in Florida
- Timeline of women's suffrage in Florida
- Women's suffrage in Florida
