= List of power stations in Vermont =

Sources of Vermont utility-scale electricity generation in gigawatt-hours, full-year 2025:
1. Hydroelectric: 1,206 (53.5%)
2. Biomass: 426 (18.9%)
3. Wind: 384 (17.0%)
4. Solar: 236 (10.5%)
5. Natural gas: 1 (0.04%)

This is a list of electricity-generating power stations in the U.S. state of Vermont, sorted by type and name. In 2024, Vermont had a total summer capacity of 864 MW through all of its power plants, and a net generation of 2,258 GWh. In 2025, the electrical energy generation mix was 53.5% hydroelectric, 18.9% biomass, 17% wind, 10.5% solar photovoltaics, and less than 0.1% natural gas. Small-scale solar, which includes customer-owned photovoltaic panels, delivered an additional net 245 GWh to the state's electrical grid in 2025. This was about 4 percent more than the generation by Vermont's utility-scale photovoltaic plants.

Vermont's 99.9% share of electricity from renewable sources was the highest in the United States during 2019. Vermont had the second lowest population after Wyoming, and total electricity consumption was the lowest among all 50 states. Vermont consumed three times more electricity than it generated in-state, and imported most of its electricity needs from Canada and New York. Vermont's Renewable Electricity Standard aims for the state to obtain 90% of all electricity from renewable sources by 2050, in part by further reducing per-capita consumption through less waste and greater efficiency of electricity use.

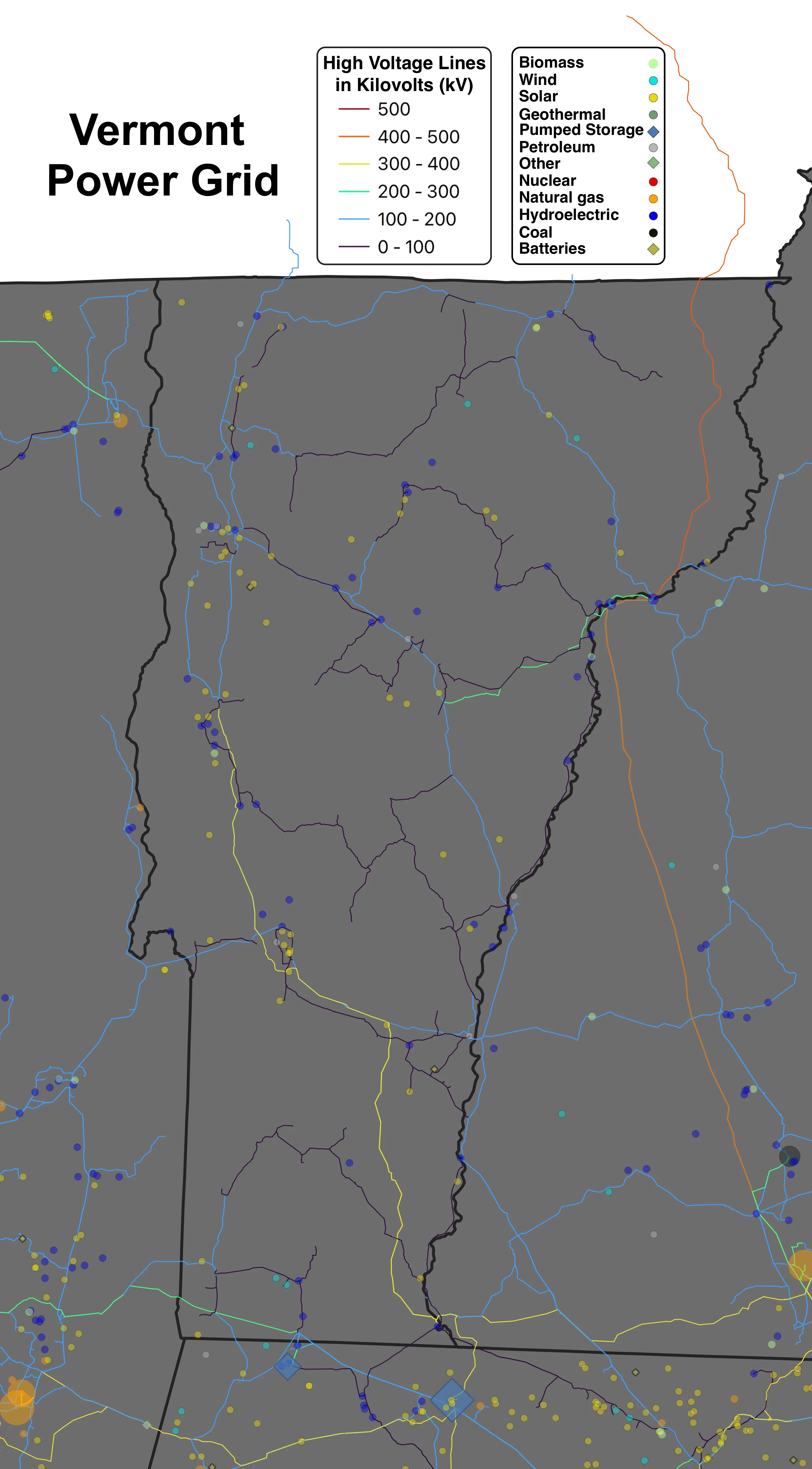
Vermont power grid

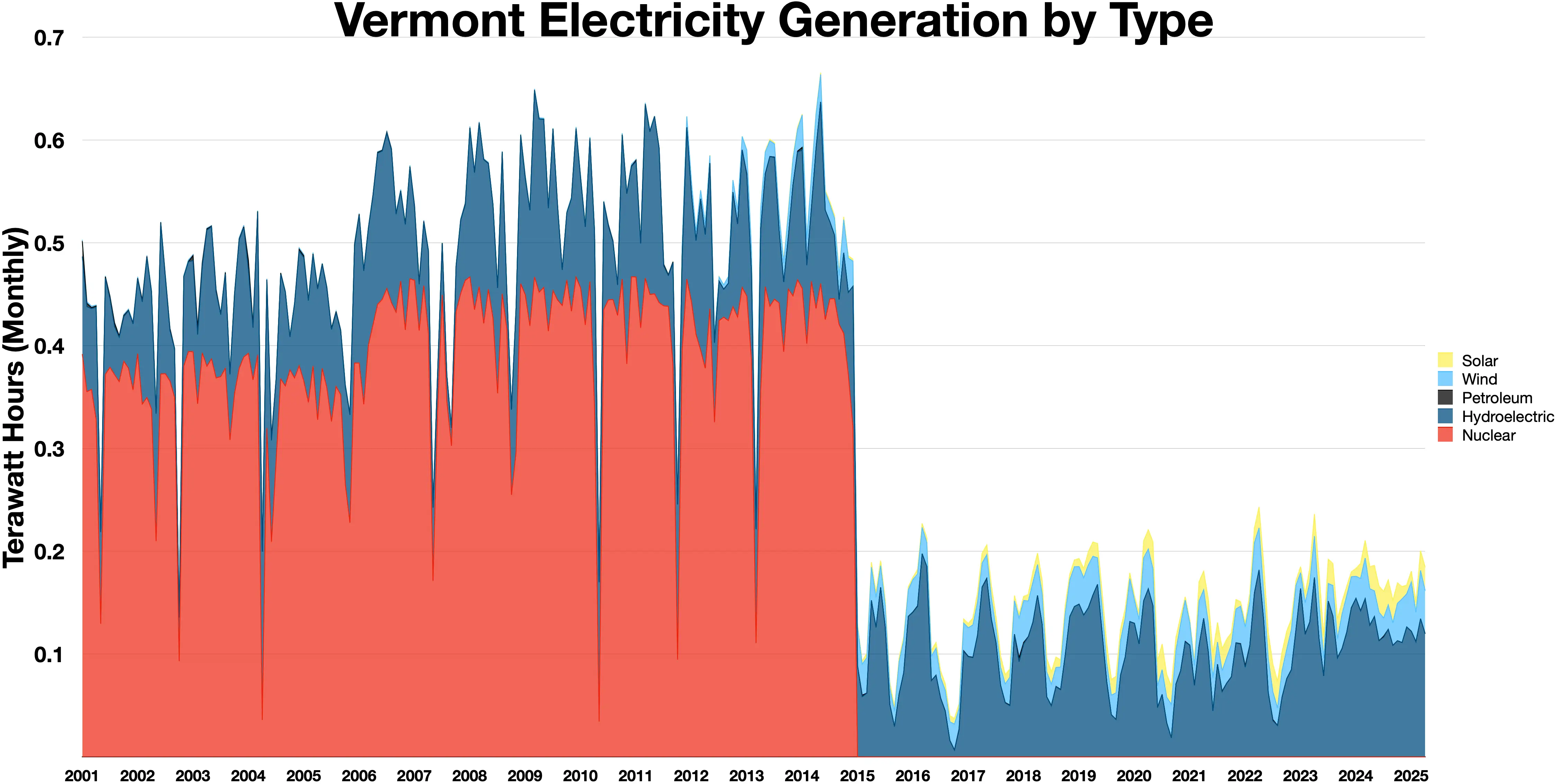
Vermont electricity generation by type

== Nuclear power stations ==
The Vermont Yankee Nuclear Power Plant generated 620 MW of base load electricity during years 1972–2014. Vermont had no operating utility-scale plants that used fissile material as a fuel in 2019.

== Fossil-fuel power stations ==
Data from the U.S. Energy Information Administration serves as a general reference.

=== Coal-fired ===
Vermont had no operating utility-scale plants that used coal as a fuel in 2019.

=== Natural gas-fired ===
Vermont had no operating utility-scale plants that used fossil gas as a primary fuel in 2019 (see also Biomass).

=== Petroleum-fired ===
Note: All plants fueled by petroleum in Vermont were peaker plants in 2019.

Name	Location	Coordinates	Capacity (MW)	Refs	Year opened	Note
Ascutney Plant	Windsor County	43.4011°N 72.4203°W	13.2		1961	
Berlin 5 Plant	Washington County	44.251°N 72.6027°W	42		1972	
Burlington GT Plant	Chittenden County	44.4814°N 73.2239°W	25		1971	
Colchester 16 Plant	Chittenden County	44.4906°N 73.1703°W	18		1965	
Florence Plant	Rutland County	43.7089°N 73.0631°W	9.2		1992	
Project 10 Plant	Franklin County	44.9166°N 73.1000°W	48		2010	
Rutland Plant	Rutland County	43.603°N 72.9923°W	13.2		1962	
Vergennes 9 Plant	Addison County	44.1664°N 73.2575°W	4		1964	paired with 2MW hydro

== Renewable power stations ==
Data from the U.S. Energy Information Administration serves as a general reference.

=== Biomass ===
Name	Location	Coordinates	Capacity (MW)	Refs	Year opened	Fuel
Coventry Clean Energy	Orleans County	44.9087°N 72.2214°W	8.0		2019	landfill gas
J C McNeil Generating Station	Chittenden County	44.4917°N 73.2080°W	50		1984	primary: wood chips (99%) secondary: fossil gas or oil
Moretown Renewable Energy	Washington County	44.3122°N 72.7113°W	1.6		2009	landfill gas
Ryegate Power Station	Caledonia County	44.2131°N 72.0572°W	20		1992	primary: wood chips secondary: propane

=== Hydroelectric ===
Name	Location	Coordinates	Capacity (MW)	Refs	Year opened	Note
Beldens Hydropower Plant	Addison County	44.0525°N 73.1762°W	5.7		1913	4.1MW added 1988
Bellows Falls Hydropower Station	Windham County	43.1375°N 72.4464°W	40.8		1928	
Bolton Falls Hydroelectric	Washington County	44.3594°N 72.8167°W	8.8		1986	
Chace Mill Winooski One Hydro	Chittenden County	44.4900°N 73.1875°W	7.5		1993	
Essex 19 Hydroelectric	Chittenden County	44.4821°N 73.1164°W	8.0		1917	
Harriman Hydropower Station	Windham County	42.7936°N 72.9144°W	33.6		1924	
Highgate Falls Hydroelectric	Franklin County	44.9336°N 73.0511°W	11.1		1930	3.2MW added 1954; 5.8MW added 1990
Huntington Falls Hydroelectric	Addison County	44.0703°N 73.1961°W	5.7		1911	25% increase 1989
Marshfield 6 Hydropower Plant	Washington County	44.3606°N 72.3356°W	5.0		1927	
Mcindoes Hydropower Station	Caledonia County	44.2603°N 72.0592°W	10.4		1931	
Milton Hydropower Plant	Chittenden County	44.6414°N 73.1134°W	7.4		1929	
Peterson Hydropower Plant	Chittenden County	44.6381°N 73.1625°W	6.3		1948	
Pownal Tannery	Bennington County		0.5		1866	
Proctor Hydropower Plant	Rutland County	43.6628°N 73.0340°W	10.0		1905	1.6MW added 1927; 2.9MW added 1984
Sheldon Springs Hydroelectric	Franklin County	44.9108°N 72.9736°W	25.2		1988	
Vernon Dam Hydropower Station	Windham County	42.7716°N 72.5146°W	35.9		1909	8.4MW added 1921
Waterbury 22 Hydropower Plant	Washington County	44.3813°N 72.7677°W	5.5		1953	
Wilder Hydropower Station	Windsor County	43.6679°N 72.3036°W	35.6		1950	3.2MW added 1987
Wrightsville Hydroelectric Plant	Washington County	44.30873°N 72.57598°W	0.8			

=== Wind ===
Name	Location	Coordinates	Capacity (MW)	Refs	Year opened	Turbine mfg spec
Deerfield Wind Farm	Bennington County	42.8772°N 72.9937°W	30		2017	Gamesa 2.0MW
Georgia Mountain Wind Farm	Chittendon County	44.6617°N 73.07°W	10		2012	Goldwind 2.5MW
Kingdom Community Wind Project	Orleans County	44.7483°N 72.4253°W	63		2012	Vestas 3.0MW
Searsburg Wind Energy Facility	Bennington County	42.8625°N 72.9628°W	6		1997	Zond 0.5MW
Sheffield Wind Farm	Caledonia County	44.6760°N 72.1013°W	40		2011	Clipper 2.5MW

=== Solar ===
Name	Location	Coordinates	Capacity (MW_{AC}) (Storage (MW))	Refs	Year opened	Note
Boardman Hill Solar Farm	Rutland County	43.583941°N 73.021632°W	1.5		2015	
Coolidge Solar Farm	Windsor County	43.4248°N 72.6653°W	19.6		2018	
Elizabeth Mines Solar Array	Orange County	43.824°N 72.3311°W	5.0		2017	
Essex Solar Storage Hybrid	Chittendon County	44.2859°N 73.0233°W	4.5 (2)		2019	
Ferrisburgh Solar Storage Hybrid	Addison County	44.1334°N 73.1441°W	5.0 (2)		2019	
Hartford Solar Array	Windsor County	43.6320°N 72.41856°W	5.0		2016	
Milton Solar Storage Hybrid	Chittendon County	44.3921°N 73.1023°W	5.0 (2)		2019	
Panton Solar Project	Addison County	44.0858°N 73.1954°W	4.9 (1)		2016	
Williamstown 2 Solar Array	Orange County	44.1361°N 72.5105°W	5.0		2016	
Williston Solar Farm	Chittendon County	44.4655°N 73.1032°W	4.7		2016	
