= SoLo Funds =

American fintech company

- Industry: Financial technology
- Founded: 2018; 8 years ago
- Founders: Travis Holoway, Rodney Williams
- Headquarters: Los Angeles
- Area served: United States
- Key people: Travis Holoway (CEO); Rodney Williams (President)
- Products: Peer-to-peer lending; banking services; AI financial tools
- Number of employees: 90 (2023)
- Website: solofunds.com

SoLo Funds is an American company that operates a community banking platform, which includes peer-to-peer lending. The company was founded in 2018 and is based in Los Angeles.

The company's app has been downloaded by almost 2 million registered users as of 2024. The company has faced several legal challenges over its business model.

== History ==
SoLo Funds was founded in 2018 in New York City by Travis Holoway and Rodney Williams. Holoway and Williams wanted to provide short-term and small dollar loans as an alternative to banks and high-interest credit cards. The company was launched through the Hillman Accelerator in Cincinnati, and, in July 2018, they were accepted into the Techstars Kansas City program. In January 2019, the company relocated to Los Angeles.

In 2019, the initial version of the company ran out of money and shut down. The founders relaunched the company in April 2020.

In November 2021, the company earned B Corp certification.

In April 2022, the company released the digital SoLo Wallet, allowing customers to add or access funds to their bank accounts and debit cards.

In 2023, the company announced an investment from investors, including tennis player Serena Williams's Serena Ventures. Also in 2023, the firm made CNBC's Disruptor 50 list.

In February 2023, the company reported over 1.3 million downloads of its app. The company also reported it had processed over 600,000 loans, accounting for $300 million in transaction volume.

In February 2024, the company reported almost 2 million users of its app. In July 2024, CNN Underscored editors rated SoLo Funds as the best peer-to-peer lending app.

In January 2025, Solo released its 2025 Cash Poor report, based on a survey of 2,000 American adults, conducted by SoLo analysts in partnership with Opinium Research, Pace University, the Global Black Economic Forum, Aspen Institute, Financial Security Program, and the Independent Women’s Forum. The report concluded that cash poor Americans paid $39 billion on top of the advertised Annual Percentage Rate (APR) rates for short-term loans.

In September 2025, the company launched SoLo IQ, an AI tool offering personalized budgeting, wealth-building, and spending guidance. During the 2025 United States federal government shutdown, the company reported a surge in loan activity.

== Services ==
SoLo Funds is a community based banking platform where members provide peer-to-peer loans to other members. Members can access a loan marketplace, and also get a checking account and a debit card. The company's Solo Wallet is designed to simplify the lending and borrowing process. Members make loan requests, and other members scroll through the marketplace to look for loans to fund. Loans come with a flat fee, and members can also leave tips for lenders. The company also provides financial counseling, including budgeting and risk management assistance, through its Solo IQ AI platform.

== Operations ==
As of November 2025, the company reported it had provided loans worth $700 million to more than 2 million active users. The company is headquartered in Los Angeles. Travis Holoway is the company's CEO, and Rodney Williams is the company's president.

== Legal issues ==
The company functions via a peer-to-peer lending platform, claiming that its loans are interest free. However, SoLo Funds has been involved in several legal cases over alleged misleading marketing about its business model.

In May 2023, the company settled regulatory cases in California, Connecticut and Washington DC, over allegedly misleading consumers about interest rates and fees as tips and donations. The company defended its tipping and donation model, but paid some penalties and agreed to make disclosures about tips and donations being voluntary.

In December 2023, Maryland regulators raised similar allegations. In May 2024, the Consumer Financial Protection Bureau (CFPB) sued the company over its lending model.

In July 2024, Pennsylvania Attorney General Michelle Henry announced a settlement with SoLo Funds for a regulatory case similar to those brought earlier by other states. The settlement, in the form of an assurance of voluntary compliance, required SoLo to pay a penalty and modify its business practices to comply with Pennsylvania law.

In October 2024, a federal judge denied SoLo Funds’ motion to dismiss the CFPB ruling.

In February 2025, the CFPB dropped its lawsuit against Solo Funds, reportedly the first case withdrawn by the CFPB after the Trump administration took over the agency.
