= Deirdre Macnab =

American women's rights and voting rights activist (born 1955)

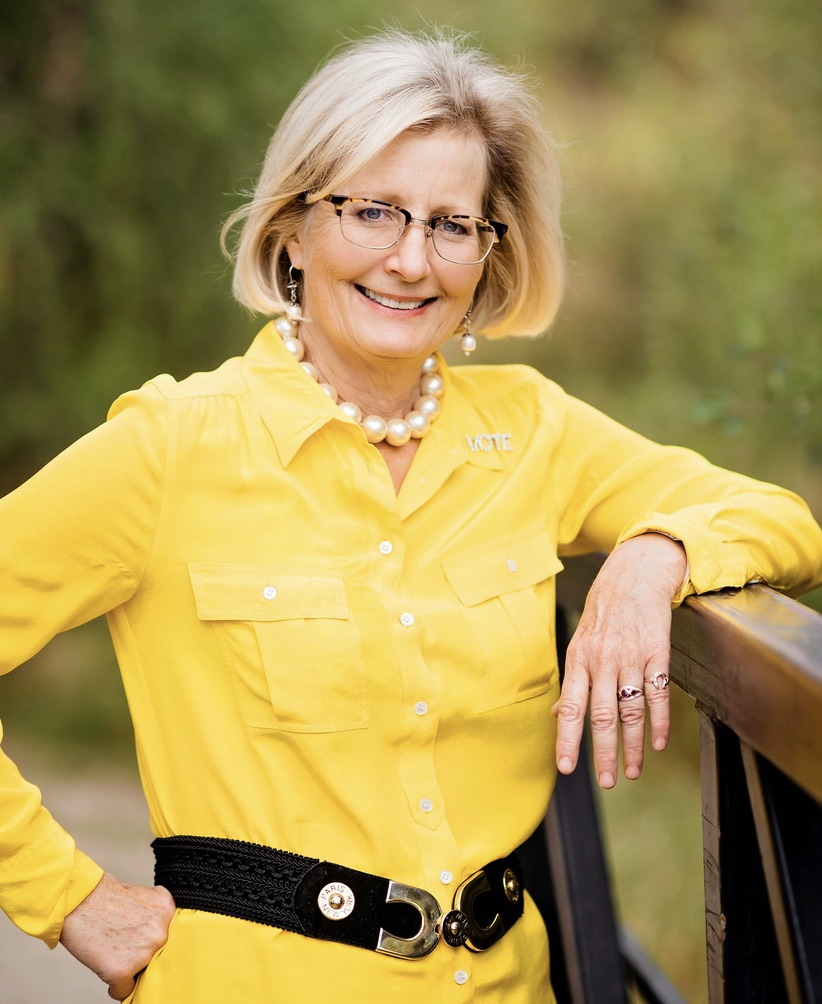
- Deirdre Macnab
- Born: December 14, 1955 (age 70); United States
- Known for: Voting Rights Activist, Solar Energy Advocate, Sustainable Ranching

Deirdre Macnab (née Coulson; born December 14, 1955) is an American women's rights and voting rights activist and sustainable agriculture rancher. She is former president of the League of Women Voters of Florida (LWVFL) and member of Florida's Federal Judicial Nominating Commission. She served as a Knight's Fellow-in-Residence at the University of Florida Bob Graham Center for Public Service and is a solar energy activist in Florida, acting as chairperson for LWVFL solar energy initiative, and in Colorado, where she is on the Solar United Neighbors advisory board.

== Early life and education ==
Macnab was raised in Manhattan and moved to Florida in 2004. She graduated with an M.B.A. from Columbia University in marketing and finance and a bachelor's degree from New York University in history and political science. After moving to the greater Orlando, Florida area, Macnab joined the board of MyRegion, a seven-county visioning coalition in Central Florida and WMFE's Community Advisory Board, in addition to joining the League of Women Voters of Florida (LWVFL).

== Political career ==
Macnab became president of the League of Women Voters of Florida (LWVFL) in 2009, where she spearheaded petitions for fair voting districts in Florida, tax reform and voter protection, and worked towards opening a dialogue with Cuba by organizing several delegations to the country. During her tenure as LWVFL president, two state constitutional amendments ending gerrymandering were finally accomplished, after 60 years of work by the Florida League.

Under her presidency, the LWVFL announced a lawsuit in April 2014, protecting Florida voters from being purged from voter rolls within 90 days of a federal election, and she was asked to talk about it on The Daily Show. The state eventually decided not to purge the voter rolls. During her leadership, serious restrictions on voter registration drives were imposed and eventually removed because of the League's work. It eliminated roadblocks to voting by demanding the Florida Legislature re-institute early voting days, and the Sunday before election day, following long delays, including eight-hour lines in Miami, that voters faced during the 2012 Presidential election. The LWVFL also pushed for fairly-drawn congressional districts and saw fair districting upheld and implemented in 2014.

Deirdre Macnab was nominated for the National Slate of the League of Women Voters of the United States in 2014, and was then nominated to be their National President in 2015. Although her bid for the presidency was unsuccessful, she is generally credited with having transformed the Florida League of Women Voters, as well as many state policies, during her long tenure as president.

Her initiatives include; lobbying for the implementation of civil citations as a way to curb the school to prison pipeline and reduce youth arrests; heading the campaign to take Florida to the number one position in rooftop solar and harness the sun to truly make Florida the "Sunshine State"; educating the voting public about two 2016 ballot amendments, successfully helping defeat one and pass the other; creating "The Next Car Pledge"and advocating for the benefits of zero emission electric cars or "EVs".

In 2020 Macnab left Florida to start a regenerative cattle ranch in Colorado, becoming one of the first Audubon Certified ranches in Northwest Colorado. She co-founded the Meeker Mustang Makeover, an event designed to find homes for wild horses in BLM holding areas, the White River Alliance, a stakeholder group working to promote citizen engagement for the protection and conservation of the White River basin, and continues her alternative energy work with Solar United Neighbors of Colorado.

== Honors and awards ==
In 2012, Macnab was awarded the 2012 Florida Achievement Award by the Florida Commission on the Status of Women. The Orlando Sentinel named her the Most Influential Central Floridian of the Year the same year.

In 2013, she was recognized by La Prensa Florida as a Community Champion during their annual Mujeres Destacadas Awards. She was recognized for her leadership and placed in the Congressional Record in 2014. In 2015, Audubon Florida honored her with the Women in Conservation award.

In 2021 Winter Park Magazine honored Macnab as an "Influential" due, in part, to her legacy of inspiring other strong women to follow her lead.
