= Mount de Chantal Visitation Academy =

- U.S. National Register of Historic Places
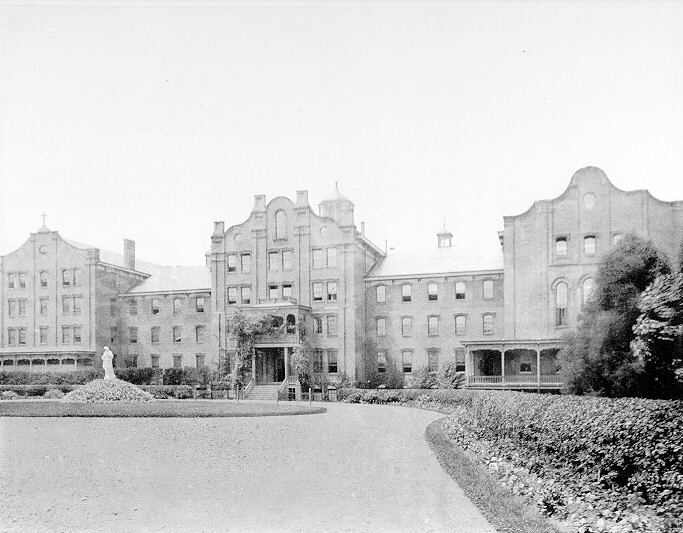
- Mount de Chantal Visitation Academy (1889)

- Location within West Virginia Location within the United States
- Location: Washington Ave., Wheeling, West Virginia
- Coordinates: 40°4′10″N 80°41′38″W
- Built: 1865
- Architect: Barthberger, Charles F.; Whelan, Bishop Vincent
- Architectural style: Eclectic Victorian
- NRHP reference No.: 78002808
- Added to NRHP: November 27, 1978

Mount de Chantal Visitation Academy

Location
- Washington Avenue; Wheeling, West Virginia

Information
- Type: Private, All-Female (5-12)
- Religious affiliation: Roman Catholic
- Established: 1848
- Closed: 2008
- Grades: PK-12

Mount de Chantal Visitation Academy was a private Catholic all-girls school in the city of Wheeling in the U.S. state of West Virginia.

== History ==
It was founded in 1848 as the Wheeling Female Academy in downtown Wheeling and in 1865 moved to its final location and assumed its permanent name. While grades five through twelve were all female, Mount de Chantal's Montessori and Elementary schools were co-ed. They were members of the Ohio Valley Athletic Conference.

The school building was built in 1864–1865. The original structure was composed of three major parts connected by two recessed wings. The building was constructed of brick, on a limestone foundation, with a slate covered gable roof. A two-storied brick porch, added about 1910, extended the entire width. The Fine Arts addition was built in 1906, the "laundry building" in 1908, and living quarters for the Sisters in 1972.

It was listed on the National Register of Historic Places in 1978. The school ceased operations on May 31, 2008, with the nuns being transferred to Georgetown Visitation in Washington D.C. Wheeling Hospital announced they were purchasing the building on April 13, 2010. No plans were announced and several historic societies were looking into preservation efforts but nothing was ever solidified. Demolition plans were announced and finalized in November 2011. Several items left behind by the nuns were auctioned off and razing efforts commenced on November 7, 2011. No plans have been announced for the site, although the grounds are currently being used as practice fields for the local Catholic High Schools.

== Notable alumnae ==
- Virginia B. Evans, artist
- Carrie Watson Fleming, First Lady of West Virginia, 1890–1893
- Judith Herndon, West Virginia state senator
- Edna Hall Scott Kump, First Lady of West Virginia, 1933–1937
- Mary A. Nolan, suffragist
- Oriska Worden, singer and vaudeville performer

== See also ==
- List of historic sites in Ohio County, West Virginia
- List of Registered Historic Places in West Virginia
