= CleanChoice Energy =

Solar power company

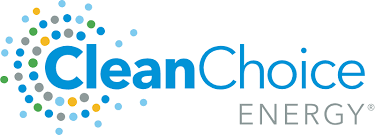
- Industry: Renewable energy, Solar energy, Retail electricity
- Founded: 2012
- Headquarters: Washington, D.C., United States
- Key people: Tom Matzzie (founder and CEO); Zoë Gamble (president); Richard Graves (cofounder and former CIO)
- Website: cleanchoiceenergy.com

CleanChoice Energy is an American energy company that supplies clean energy to consumers and owns and operates solar power facilities. The company was founded in 2012 in Washington, D.C., as a retail electricity supplier.

== History ==
In 2012, the company was founded in Washington, D.C., by Tom Matzzie and Richard Graves, as Ethical Electric. In June 2015, the Pennsylvania Attorney General's office filed an assurance of voluntary compliance over the company's direct mail solicitations; the company paid $6,000 and did not admit a violation. In 2016, the company changed its name to CleanChoice Energy. In 2021, CleanChoice Energy’s clean electricity customer base exceeded 200,000 individuals/households.

In May 2020, the Environmental Law & Policy Center filed a complaint against the company at the Illinois Commerce Commission over its marketing disclosures; CleanChoice settled in 2023 for $600,000, including $525,000 to the Illinois Solar for All program, with no admission or finding of wrongdoing.

In April 2023, True Green Capital Management acquired a majority stake in the company. The transaction included an equity investment of $100 million to support the company’s ownership, operation, and expansion of its solar projects across multiple states.

In November 2023, CleanChoice Energy acquired a 25.2 MW solar project in Franklin County, Pennsylvania, marking its first fully owned and operated facility. The project, located on a 168-acre site and capable of supplying electricity for approximately 4,500 homes, became interconnected with the PJM electric grid in December 2024.

In October 2024, the company announced the acquisition of its second fully owned and operated solar project located in Kylertown, Pennsylvania, with a planned capacity of 29.42 MW.

In June 2025, CleanChoice Energy announced the acquisition of two solar projects in New York, located in Washington County and Rensselaer County. When completed, the solar projects will generate a combined 54.2 MW of clean electricity.

In September 2025, a delegated commissioner of the Massachusetts Department of Public Utilities issued a notice of probable violation, a preliminary step rather than a final determination, proposing a $5.1 million penalty and revocation of the company's Massachusetts license over alleged deceptive marketing and pricing; CleanChoice said it would cooperate with the department, and the proceeding remained pending as of January 2026.

== Services ==
As of November 2025, CleanChoice Energy offers retail electricity supply of 100% renewable energy to homeowners and renters in Delaware, Illinois, Massachusetts, New Jersey, New York, Ohio, Pennsylvania, and Washington, D.C. The company sells clean electricity to consumers via renewable energy certificates (RECs).

== Scholarship ==
In June 2025, CleanChoice Energy launched a scholarship called the Flywheel Future Scholarship. During the first four years of operation for each of its solar projects, the company plans to award a scholarship to a graduating senior from the local school district to support their college or vocational education.
