= Community solar =

Solar power installation that accepts capital

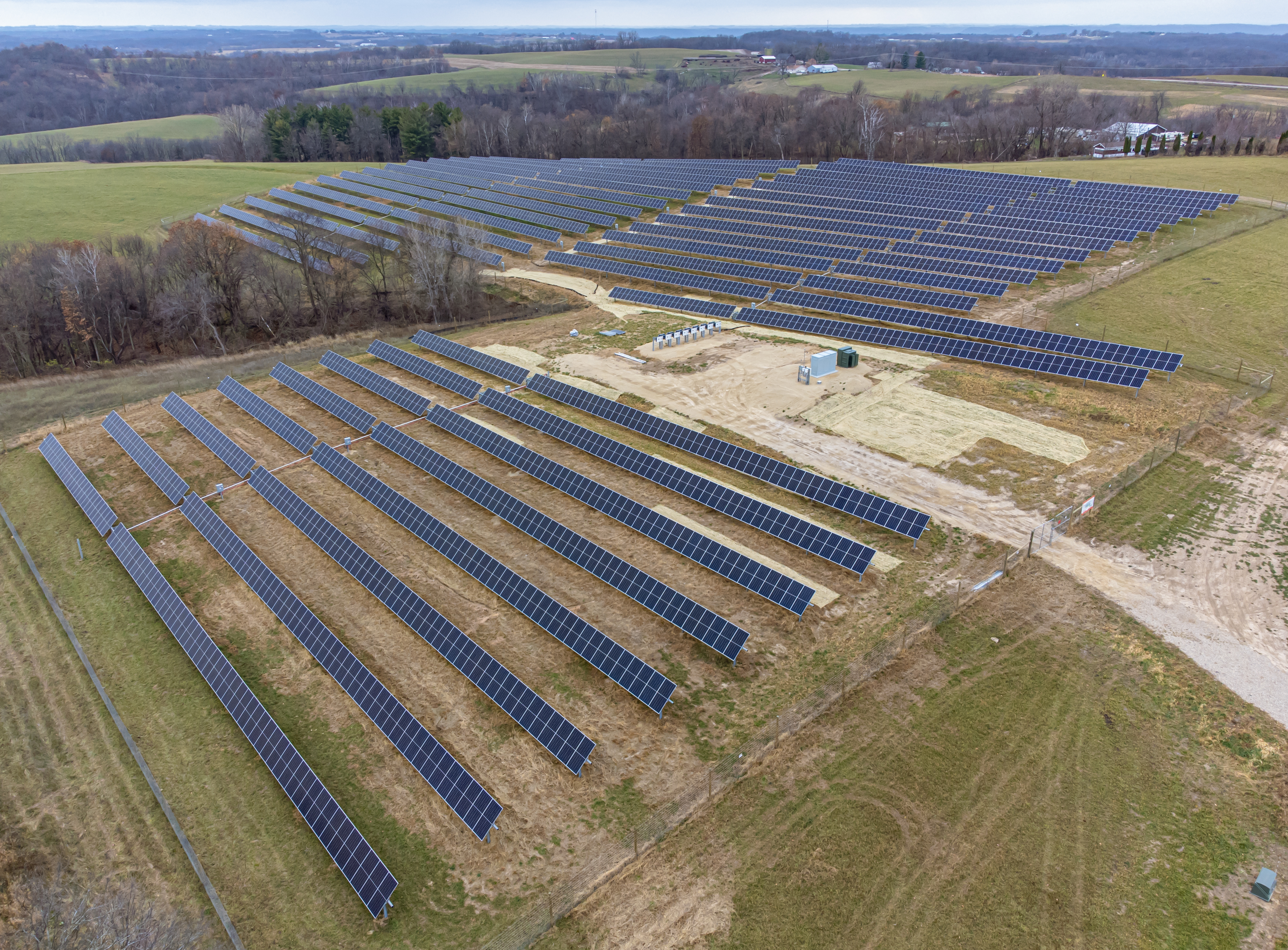
Community solar farm in the town of Wheatland, Wisconsin

A community solar project, farm or garden is a solar power installation that is funded by, and provides output credit and tax benefits to, multiple customers including individuals, businesses, nonprofits, and other investors. Participants purchase a share of or subscribe to a certain kW capacity or kWh generation of remote electrical production. The project's power output is credited to investors or subscribers in proportion to their investment, with adjustments to reflect ongoing changes in capacity, technology, costs and electricity rates. Community solar is accessible to renters, homeowners, and business owners who lack a suitable roof for traditional solar panels, don't have a suitable roof orientation for solar, or who can't afford the upfront costs of solar. Community solar provides direct access to the renewable energy to customers who cannot install it themselves. Participation in community solar programs may reduce electricity bills for low- to moderate-income (LMI) households. For instance, some programs have reported families' annual savings of around $400 on their electricity bills. Companies, cooperatives, governments or non-profits operate the systems.

== Benefits of community solar ==
Installing solar panels on a building or household can come with a variety of issues. For homeowners, these limitations include roof shape/size constraints, shading, grid capacity, and zoning regulations. Non-homeowners cannot make building modifications like solar installations. Additionally, low-income households in the U.S. face an energy burden (a term used by the U.S. Department of Energy to define how much of a household's gross income is spent on paying for energy) that is roughly triple the amount of other U.S. households. With around 50 million low-income U.S. households (about 44% of the U.S. household total), many U.S. residents are spending large amounts of their income on energy. Many of these residents, whether they are renters or their properties don't support installation, don't have access to solar.

Community solar programs are particularly beneficial for low-income households, renters, and residents of multifamily buildings who face barriers to installing rooftop solar panels. These programs allow such individuals to access renewable energy and reduce their electricity bills without the need for personal solar installations.

Community solar functions similarly to conventional grid-supply energy insofar as it provides energy remotely, requiring no installation or maintenance on the part of the consumer. Because of community solar projects' remote nature, the physical limitations of solar installation for consumers disappear. Also, due to its subscription/opt-in functionality, community solar can increase access to solar energy for low-income households. These projects benefit initial investors too. As consumer rates for solar energy become lower through distributed generation of community solar, initial investors in community solar projects experience higher returns in the long run.

Centralizing the location of solar systems can thereby create advantages over residential installations:

- Avoiding trees, roof size and/or configuration limitations, adjacent buildings, the immediate microclimate and/or other factors which may reduce power output at the residential location;
- Avoiding building codes, zoning restrictions, homeowner association rules and aesthetic concerns;
- Reduced maintenance requirements;
- Reduced installation costs;
- Return-on-investment.

There are also a number of social/community benefits of community solar:

- Expanding participation to include renters and others who are not residential property owners.
- Increased solar access for low-income residents;
- Community solar's ability to generate jobs and educational resources.

== Community solar in the United States ==
An estimated 80% of U.S. residents can neither own nor lease systems because their roofs are physically unsuitable for solar or because they live in rented or multi-family housing and do not have control over their roof. As of February 2025, 24 states and Washington D.C. have active policies that support community solar. Of these states, 20 include provisions supporting low-and-moderate-income (LMI) households.

According to a market analysis conducted by the National Renewable Energy Laboratory, as of December 2024 there were 44 U.S. states with at least one community solar project, including the District of Columbia. The combined capacity of community solar projects across the US was more than 7,800 megawatts. This capacity was concentrated in Florida, New York, Massachusetts, and Minnesota.

Many states have adopted virtual net metering (VNM) policies, which let businesses or households that subscribe to an offsite community solar project receive the net metering credits from that remote project.

Community solar subscribers can only claim to use renewable energy if they receive the renewable energy certificates (RECs) associated with the electricity they are using. Often, RECs are split from the electricity that community solar projects create and sold to utilities in order to help them comply with renewable portfolio standards implemented by states.

The City of Ellensburg, Washington, and its municipal electric utility claim to have installed the first community solar system in 2006.

=== Federal Policies and Programs ===
The U.S. government has implemented programs to promote community solar access for disadvantaged communities. The Environmental Protection Agency's $7 billion Solar for All initiative aims to enable over 900,000 households in low-income and disadvantaged communities to benefit from distributed solar energy.

The solar Investment Tax Credit (ITC), implemented in 2006, is a one-time tax credit for commercial solar developers, including those who develop community solar projects. While the solar ITC rate was scheduled to gradually decrease over time, Congress passed a two-year extension of the 26% rate in 2020 alongside a COVID relief package, and the Inflation Reduction Act of 2022 restored its original 30% rate.

The Solar Energy Technologies Office (SETO) in the U.S. Department of Energy has sponsored various community solar related projects and research efforts. One such program is the National Community Solar Partnership, a partnership of various community solar stakeholders with the aim of increasing accessibility and affordability of community solar programs in the U.S.

At least 14 states have included low-income provisions in their community solar programs, employing various approaches such as carve-outs, incentives, and dedicated funding to ensure equitable access.

In July 2025, the One Big Beautiful Bill (OBBB) was signed into law, altering clean energy tax credits established under the Inflation Reduction Act. The bill accelerates the phaseout of solar tax incentives including timelines for commercial solar projects and imposes strict material sourcing guidelines. For community solar developers and financiers, the investment tax credit (ITC) will no longer apply to projects that have not started construction by the end of 2027 – posing challenges for future development.

During Donald Trump’s second presidency, several Biden-era climate and clean energy policies affecting solar development were reviewed or curtailed. In January 2025, Trump ordered federal agencies to pause disbursements under the Inflation Reduction Act and the Infrastructure Investment and Jobs Act while programmes were reviewed for consistency with the administration’s energy policy. In August 2025, the administration announced that it would no longer implement the $7 billion Solar for All programme, which had been designed to expand rooftop and community solar access for low-income and disadvantaged communities in the United States.

=== California ===
SolarShares (2007) offers customers of the Sacramento Municipal Utility District the opportunity to buy shares in its solar farm. The electricity generated by each customer's "shares appears as a credit on his or her energy bill, a savings expected to average between $4–$50 a month, given sunshine variability. For a monthly fee—starting at $10.75 a month (averaging 9%) for a 0.5 kW system—participants opt into solar power production. The current phase is sold out, although plans are in progress to expand capacity.

The PVUSA array in Davis, California (2001) provides virtual net metering for city-owned meters. The California legislature passed a law specifically allowing this for this individual array. Senate Bill 43 was signed by Governor Brown on September 28, 2013

=== Colorado ===
Colorado legislation passed in 2010 that requires the Public Utilities Commission to rewrite rules to direct investor-owned utilities to offer rebates for community solar gardens.

HB10-1342, the Community Solar Gardens Act specified:

- Energy must be sold directly to an investor-owned utility.
- Utility pays retail + RECs.
- Utility provides Virtual Net Metering credit on the subscribing customer's bill.
- System size limited to 2 megawatts (MW).
- 6 MW total limit on the program for first three years.
- There must be at least 10 subscribers.
- Subscribers must be located in same county or city as the solar garden. Subscribers whose county has a population less than 20,000 may subscribe in a neighboring county.
- Subscribers may buy up to 120% of their own power use worth of solar power.
- Either a for-profit or nonprofit entity may own and administer the solar garden.

In Colorado, Xcel Energy customers continue to pay the standard non-energy fees but can buy enough solar shares to offset 120 percent of their load.

In 2024, Colorado Governor Jared Polis signed SB24-207, the Community Solar Modernization Act, to streamline solar farm development and expand access for low-to-moderate income (LMI) households. Starting in 2026, the law increases the maximum size of community solar gardens to 5 MW, requires at least 51% of capacity to serve LMI subscribers with a minimum 25% bill discount, and mandates utility companies to offer 100 MW of community solar capacity over two years.

=== Florida ===
Orlando Utilities Commission (OUC) has a solar farm that began producing power in October 2013. The municipal utility, which has approximately 55 percent of its 230,000 electric customers living in multi-family housing, sought a unique solution for those wanting to use solar power, but unable to modify the homes they rent or lease. This project also allows those customers the ability to buy into solar without all of the upfront costs. Subscribing customers volunteered to pay a higher rate on their power bill, but they were also able to lock in that rate for the estimated life of the project – 25 years. Today, 1,312 solar panels are generating up to 400 kilowatts (kW) of electricity at OUC's Gardenia Operations facility next to Interstate 4. The panels are on three canopies, which have created 151 covered LED-lit parking spaces over about 2.5 acres. A total of 39 customers have subscribed to the project. Each kW of the array's 400 kW was sold in blocks, with a limit of 15 blocks per customer. Each block represents 112 kilowatt hours (kWh) on a customer's monthly bill, so the maximum benefit per customer is 1,680 kWh. The average OUC residential customer uses around 1,200 kWh. Any unused power is credited on the account for the next month.

=== Illinois ===
Illinois has a strong community solar market thanks to the Future Energy Jobs Act and the Climate Equitable Jobs Act. Illinois first introduced community solar under the Illinois Shines Program in 2019. According to pv magazine USA, Illinois was ranked fourth for its community solar operating capacity as of 2024, and as of the beginning of 2025, it had 393 MWac of total community solar capacity.

=== Maryland ===
Maryland established a community energy pilot program in 2017. The purpose of this program is to invest in Maryland's solar industry, diversify the energy resources of the state, and provide renewable energy for all state residents, particularly those who qualify as low-to-moderate income. Several utility companies, including BGE, Potomac Electric Power Company (Pepco), Delmarva Power & Light, and Potomac Edison Company (MD) have been working alongside subscriber organizations, including Neighborhood Sun, to provide customers with a subscription to existing solar projects.

There are several existing solar farms across Maryland, including the Panorama Landfill project. It is the largest in the US and the first residential solar farm in Maryland. Located in Fort Washington, Maryland on a former landfill, Panorama covers 25 acres of land and contains 19,000 panels.

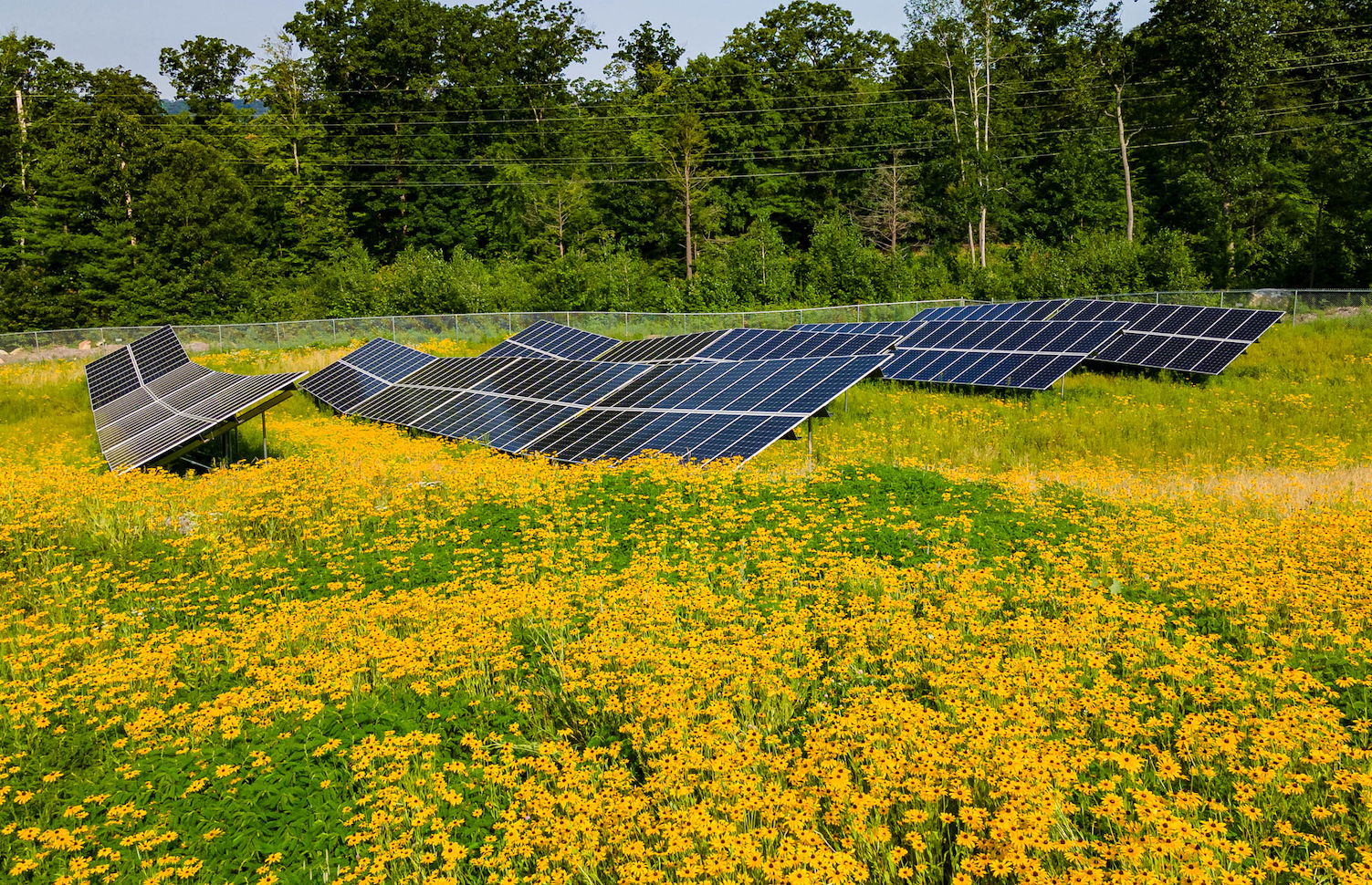
Pollinator Sites are gaining popularity at Community Solar Farms across the country. Nexamp Community Solar Farm featured in Lunenburg Massachusetts

=== Massachusetts ===
The Green Communities Act of 2008 authorized what was formally known as "neighborhood net-metering", which allowed a group of residents in a neighborhood/town to pool resources to cover the capital cost of a renewable energy installation.

Residents of Brewster founded the first cooperatively run solar garden in Massachusetts. The solar garden was built by solar installer My Generation Energy Inc. Each member of the cooperative was to receive benefits from the co-op; including the net-metering credits from the solar garden through Nstar. Known as the Brewster Community Solar Garden, it is a 345.6 kW community solar farm located on Cape Cod.

Massachusetts and the Federal government each offered incentives to improve solar economics. A traditional investment in photovoltaics without incentives would take 12 or more years to pay back the initial cost. The incentives lowered the payback period to 6–10 years.

Gardens built by developer Clean Energy Collective started producing power in Newton, Massachusetts in July 2014. The company originally partnered with now-defunct energy efficiency firm Next Step Living and is currently working with the startup Solstice Initiative.

The largest community solar-plus-storage farm in the state in Winchendon, Massachusetts was completed in March, 2018 by CleanChoice Energy and Borrego Solar.

In 2018, Massachusetts implemented the Solar Massachusetts Renewable Target (SMART) program as a replacement for the state's former Solar Renewable Energy Credit (SREC II) program. Under the SMART program, Massachusetts pays solar energy system owners at a fixed rate per kilowatt hour as an incentive. This program was updated in 2020, and updates included an expansion of the definition of Low Income Customers and expanded consumer protection standards.

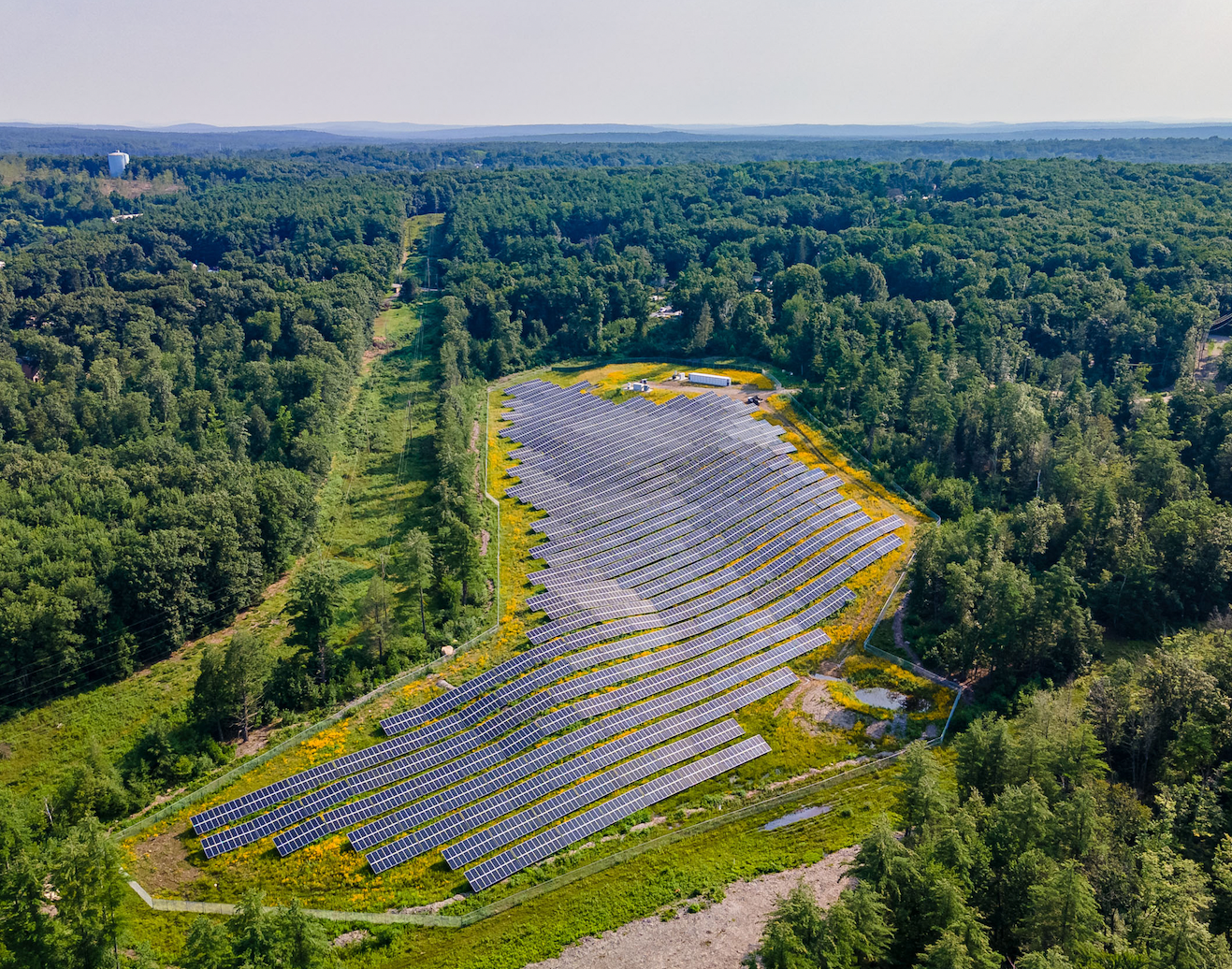
Nexamp Community Solar Farm - Electric Ave in Lunenburg Massachusetts

=== Minnesota ===
In 2013, the Minnesota State Legislature passed a new law requiring Xcel Energy, the largest electric utility in the state, to begin a community solar pilot program. Other utility companies in the state do not have the same requirement, but some are voluntarily developing community solar programs. Xcel Energy still operates a community solar program in Minnesota, and the utility company oversees the Solar*Rewards program, the largest community solar program in the country. Most of its participants are not individual households, but rather large-scale clients like businesses.

In 2019, the Interstate Renewable Energy Council gave Minnesota an A grade for shared renewables programs, a category which includes community solar.

=== New Jersey ===
The New Jersey Board of Public Utilities began a community solar pilot program in 2019. In the first two years of the program, 150 projects with 225 MW capacity were approved for development and incentives. All projects are required to reserve 51% of capacity for low- to moderate-income subscribers.

=== New York ===
With more than 1.9 GW of operational capacity, New York has the top community solar market in the country, more than twice than that of Minnesota (0.9 GW), the state with the second largest community market, according to the Institute for Local Self-Reliance. As of June 2024, there was 7.87 GW of community solar in operation across the participating 44 states and localities in the U.S.

Much of the community solar developed in the state has received benefits from the state's NY-Sun program, a state solar incentive program for distributed generation assets. Since being launched in 2011, NY-Sun has put forth more than $1.8 billion to advance solar buildout in the state.

New York City is home to some of the first urban community solar farms in the country allowing renters to go solar. Rooftop community solar enables solar to become economically feasible for building owners.

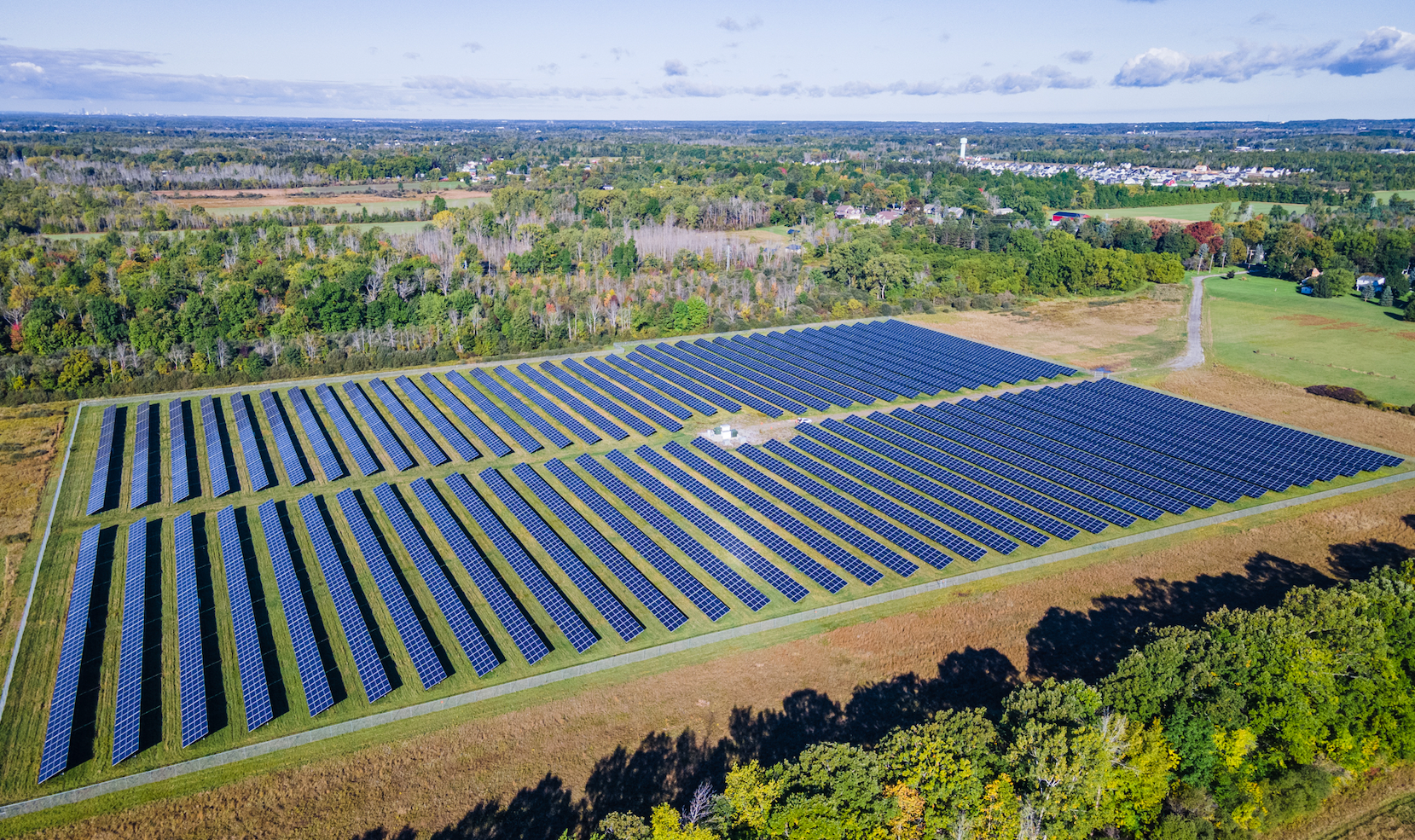
Nexamp Community Solar Farm in Pendleton, Lockport, NY

=== Utah ===
Electric utilities in St. George built a large photovoltaic facility to exploit 310 days a year with sunlight, and allowed residents to purchase it to supplement conventional energy. The program required no set-up or maintenance for the participant.

Participation is sold in whole and half units of 1 kilowatt. A 1 kW unit on the SunSmart grid cost $6,000. One unit equals approximately 15% of the average home's monthly power (or about 140 kWh). A one-time tax credit of 25% of the purchase price, up to a maximum of $2,000, was available from the state of Utah. Purchasers received a monthly energy credit for the energy produced that month by the unit of panels.

=== Vermont ===
The Boardman Hill Solar Farm opened in 2015.

=== Washington DC ===
Washington, D.C.'s largest solar canopy opened in April 2021 and serves 325 low-income households. It is located on a parking structure at Children's National Research & Innovation Campus (RIC), on the former Walter Reed Army Medical Center campus. The capacity is 1,148 kW.

=== Controversy with utility providers in the United States ===
Utility providers in the U.S. have, at times, resisted the increase of distributed solar and community solar development. PV development can come in multiple forms, such as in community or individual rooftop projects. Such projects often rely on distributed generation (DG) to loop electricity from the source to the consumer. DG routes power more directly to the consumer because of its ability to circumvent utility providers. Utilities can opt to invest in and incorporate community solar into their business model, though only some have. Without aligning with community solar, the main concern for utility providers often stems from potential revenue losses.

Most utility providers pay fixed rates proportional to the electricity they generate and subsequently distribute to consumers. Traditionally, the consumer has also paid a fixed rate in order to receive utility-generated power. With DG systems, as opposed to paying this fixed rate, consumers have been increasingly able to pay a market rate for the volume of electricity they use. With consumers paying less than the traditionally-fixed rate, utility providers lose a portion of the revenue they would've received under traditional circumstances. With conventional forms of energy still maintaining the lion's share of power distribution in the U.S. (about 61% as of 2020), however, losses in utility revenue are generally small.

== Community solar in the United Kingdom ==
Community energy is carving out an increasingly prominent role within the UK's energy transition, a shift recognized by the Department for Energy Security and Net Zero, which committed £10 million to community energy groups in August 2023. The first community solar farm in the United Kingdom is the 5 MW Westmill Solar Park, near Watchfield.

== See also ==
- Community wind energy
- List of energy cooperatives
- Remote area power supply
- Westmill Solar Co-operative
- Solar canopy
- Agrivoltaics
- Energy community
