= Virginia B. Evans =

American visual artist (1894–1983)

Virginia Bargar Evans
- Born: June 5, 1894; Moundsville, West Virginia, United States
- Died: March 23, 1983 (aged 88); Moundsville, West Virginia, United States
- Education: Carnegie Mellon College of Fine Arts, Pennsylvania Academy of the Fine Arts, School of Fine Arts at Fontainebleau
- Occupations: Painter, glass designer, teacher

Virginia Bargar Evans (June 5, 1894 – March 23, 1983) was an American painter, glass designer, and teacher from West Virginia. In the Ohio Valley region she became famous for her impressionist painting and art deco glass work. Considered one of West Virginia's foremost artists of the 20th century, Evans was deemed “one of the best trained and most gifted painters” in the region by a renowned national art columnist.

== Early life and education ==
Virginia Bargar Evans was born in Moundsville, West Virginia, the daughter of Mary Estelle Myers Evans (1869–1956) and lawyer D. Barger Evans (1859–1945). In 1914, Evans graduated from Mount de Chantal Visitation Academy in Wheeling, West Virginia.

She attended Carnegie Institute of Technology School of Fine Arts in Pittsburgh; followed by the Pennsylvania Academy of the Fine Arts in Philadelphia. In 1924, she received a fellowship to the Louis Comfort Tiffany Foundation, which included a brief residency at Tiffany's Mansion, Laurelton Hall, on Oyster Bay, Long Island, where Evans worked with leading painters such as Childe Hassam, Charles Webster Hawthorne, and Gari Melchers. From 1926 to 1931, Evans made four trips to Europe, including studying at the School of Fine Arts at Fontainebleau in France during the summer of 1926. Her extensive education made Evans one of the best trained artists of her generation.

== Painting and teaching ==
Evans debuted her paintings in the Associated Artists of Pittsburgh's juried exhibits in 1923. During the late 1920s and early 1930s, paintings from her various European trips were exhibited in Wheeling, Pittsburgh, and New York City. Her paintings were widely displayed through the eastern U.S. during the 1930s.

In a time when women rarely traveled alone, Evans traveled through the eastern U.S. and northern Europe. After her 1926 trip to study in France, Evans visited Europe again in 1928, 1929, and 1931, visiting Portugal, Spain, France, Great Britain, the Netherlands and Belgium, and Germany. In 1931, for her fourth voyage across the Atlantic ocean, Evans traveled as the sole passenger on a merchant freighter with thirty-four sailors. She chose the slower merchant vessel rather than a passenger liner in order to "study the ocean." Evans also showed little regard for the social conventions of her era, focusing instead on professional accomplishments and artistic success. For these reasons, many regarded her with suspicion or scorn.

Evans showed work in the 1933 exhibit "The American Scene" at the John Herron Institute (now the Indianapolis Museum of Art) alongside artists Charles Davis, William Forsyth, Grant Wood, John Steuart Curry, Clifton Wheeler, and Zoltan Sepeshy. She also exhibited work in annual shows by the Tiffany Foundation Fellows in New York, and Society of Women Painters and Sculptors. She was elected to the Society of Women Painters and Sculptors in 1931. Also during the early 1930s, Evans' paintings were featured in solo exhibits at New York's Studio Guild and the New York Public Library. In 1936, Evans exhibited with a group of Virginian artists at the International Complex at the Rockefeller Center; and in 1938, she exhibited with another group of Virginian artists in the Annual National Exhibition of American Art in New York City, an invitational hosted by mayor Fiorello La Guardia.

Evans was deeply involved in advocating for female artists. She was active in the West Virginia Federation of Women's Clubs and the Wheeling Art Club.

After a shift to glass work during throughout the 1940s and early 1950s, Evans returned to painting in the late 1950s when she moved to Florida. The work she created during this time included abstract and traditional works, as well as experimental landscapes.

In 1957, Evans moved to Orlando, Florida before relocating to Naples, Florida two years later. In Naples, she became a member and teacher at the Naples Art Association.

In 1968, Evans work was displayed in a solo exhibit at the Oglebay Institute, in Wheeling. She also won a 1972 commission, worth $1,000, for West Virginia's Permanent Art Collection. She returned to West Virginia in 1974, to spend the rest of her life with her family.

== Imperial Glass Corporation and Glass Arts ==
Evans' career shifted in 1942 when the Imperial Glass Corporation of Bellaire, Ohio hired her to design glass products for a new line. Her Asian inspired designs included dragon and butterfly motifs, used on a line of more than thirty Imperial Cathay Crystal items ranging from candle holders to ashtrays. One piece of Evans' Cathay Crystal glasswork was displayed at the Metropolitan Museum of Art during its April 1950 special display Twentieth Century Glass, American and European.

Evans also designed for Viking Glass, Fostoria, Imperial and Warwick, and other Ohio Valley glass companies.

== Death ==
She died in 1983 in Moundsville, West Virginia.
