= Oriska Worden =

American actress and singer (1868–1954)

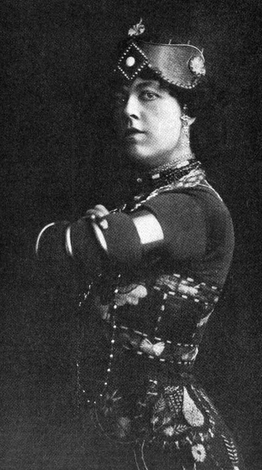
- Oriska Worden in costume, from a 1904 publication
- Born: Oriska Haverfield; July 13, 1868; Cadiz, Ohio, US
- Died: October 1, 1954 (aged 86); Hempstead, New York, US
- Other names: Oriska Breidinger, Oriska Baird
- Occupations: Singer, actress
- Years active: 1890s–1910s

Oriska Worden (July 13, 1868 – October 1, 1954), born Oriska Haverfield, was an American actress and singer.

== Early life and education ==
Oriska Haverfield was born in Cadiz, Ohio, the daughter of George A. Haverfield and Mattie Elna Warman Haverfield. Her father was a disabled veteran of the American Civil War; he died in 1886. Her mother remarried, to Col. Frederick W. Worden in 1888; her stepfather's brother was Admiral John Lorimer Worden. As a young woman, Oriska Worden helped her mother, a physician and orthopedic surgeon who ran "a summer sanitarium and school of physical culture" in Michigan.

Worden attended the Mount du Chantal convent school in West Virginia, and studied voice at the Michigan State Normal Conservatory of Music in Ypsilanti, Michigan, graduating in 1892. She pursued further musical studies in Paris with Belgian singer Jacques Bouhy.

== Career ==
Worden sang with the Castle Square Opera Company of Boston, early in her career. In 1897, she toured in the American West with a stock company. In 1899, she modeled and spoke about "the new French tight-fitting skirt" for a newspaper feature.

On Broadway she appeared in The Supper Club (1901–1902) and in My Lady Molly (1904). In 1905, she was in vaudeville starring in The Queen's Fan, an operetta. She was in a comic opera, Burning to Sing, in vaudeville in 1907.

Worden taught at the summer school of the Petoskey Normal Conservatory in 1899. In 1908, she began teaching voice students at a studio in Carnegie Building in New York. In 1912, she announced that she was directing a theatrical costuming department for Renard's in New York.

== Personal life ==
Worden married William P. Baird in Tennessee in 1884. She married wealthy Charles W. Glover in 1892. In 1901 she announced that she would sue his parents for alienation of affection, and Glover himself for alimony, after they were divorced in 1895. She owned property in Petoskey, Michigan, until she sold it in 1915. Her third husband was John Breidinger; they married in New York in 1923. Oriska Breidinger died in 1954, at the age of 86, in Hempstead, New York.
