= Judith Herndon =

American politician

Judith A. Herndon

Member of the West Virginia Senate for the 1st District
- In office July 3, 1974 – November 19, 1980

Member of the West Virginia House of Delegates
- In office June 2, 1970 – July 3, 1974

Personal details
- Born: June 5, 1941 Wheeling, West Virginia
- Died: November 19, 1980 (aged 39)
- Education: Mount de Chantal Visitation Academy
- Profession: Attorney

Judith Herndon (1941 - 1980) was a member of the West Virginia Senate. She was the only female senator at that time. She was known as a voice of moderation and leadership, particularly in the areas of tax reform, sunset legislation, and the protection of civil liberties. The Judith A. Herndon Fellowship at the West Virginia Legislature was named to honor her contributions as a state lawmaker.
