= Boardman Hill Solar Farm =

Photovoltaic (PV) solar project in Vermont

Coordinates: 43.583941°N 73.021632°W

The Boardman Hill Solar Farm (BHSF) is a 150 kW AC community solar farm project. The Farm is the first community solar array in Vermont that fulfills the “Vermont Grown, Vermont Green” mission: complete member-ownership, democratic management of ongoing operations, and retirement of the RECs generated by the solar farm. It is located on the Boardman Hill Farm in West Rutland, Vermont.

In 2015 BHSF was awarded the Vermont Energy and Climate Action Network Best Project of 2015 It received the Vermont Governor's Environmental Excellence Award in 2016.

== See also ==
- Solar power in Vermont
