= Julia Anna Norris =

American physician

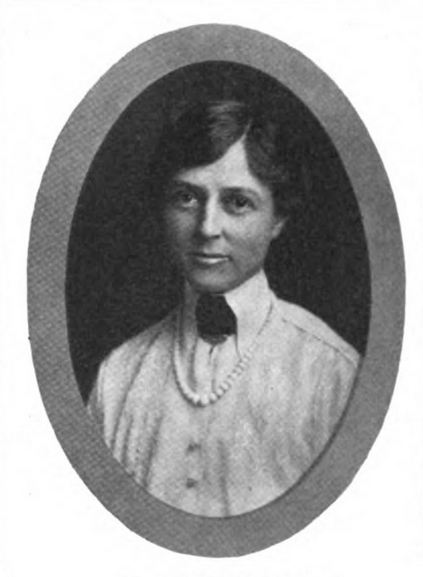
- J. Anna Norris, from a 1919 publication
- Born: November 29, 1874; Boston, Massachusetts
- Died: September 18, 1958 (aged 83); Minneapolis, Minnesota
- Other name: J. Anna Norris
- Occupations: Physician, college professor
- Known for: Taught physical education at the University of Minnesota from 1912 to 1941

Julia Anna Norris (November 29, 1874 – September 18, 1958), often known as J. Anna Norris, was an American physician and college professor, based in Minneapolis.

== Early life and education ==
Julia Anna Norris was born in Boston, the daughter of Edward L. Norris and Sarah E. Hoyt Norris. She studied physical education at the Boston Normal School of Gymnastics, and completed a medical degree at Northwestern University in 1900.

== Career ==
From 1900 to 1911, Norris taught physical education at Cortland Normal School, where she introduced women's basketball to campus. While teaching at the University of Chicago, she also served as "assistant school physician", and published a series of academic articles on physical education, titled "A Graded Course in Schoolroom Gymnastics" (1911).

In 1912 she joined the faculty at the University of Minnesota, where she taught physical education and was director of Physical Education for Women until she retired in 1941. Under her tenure, the physical education department added a pool, two gymnasiums, and classroom space, and launched a teacher training program. She worked for the establishment of the college's student health service, and women's sports. "The gymnasium and its apparatus is all very well while it lasts," she told a newspaper in 1912, "but I want the girls to wake up to the possibilities of fun and exercise that can go on after they leave college."

Beyond the university, Norris wrote a pamphlet, "Physical Education as a Profession" (1923), for the Woman's Occupational Bureau. She also wrote the introduction for a textbook, Leonora Anderson's An Athletic Program for Elementary Schools, Arranged According to Seasons (1927). In 1921, Norris debunked a published claim that "athletic girls made the worst mothers", pointing out that there was no evidence to support the claim and citing the physical activity of pioneer women in the US.

Norris was vice president of the national council of the American Physical Education Association, and president of the Mid-West Association of Directors of Physical Education for Women in Colleges and Universities. She was president of the Minneapolis Women's Rotary Club.

== Personal life and legacy ==
Norris was blind in her later years, and learned to type and use Braille. She died at her Minneapolis home in 1958, aged 83 years. She donated her 40 acres of land at Anoka, Minnesota to the University of Minnesota. This land with her cabin is part of the Cedar Creek Ecosystem Science Reserve. A gymnasium at the university was named for Norris, as is a scholarship fund. Norris Field House and Gymnasium was demolished in 2011. In 1928, she was elected a Charter Fellow in the National Academy of Kinesiology (née American Academy of Physical Education).
