= Asia Vital Components =

Taiwanese electronics company

Asia Vital Components Co., Ltd.
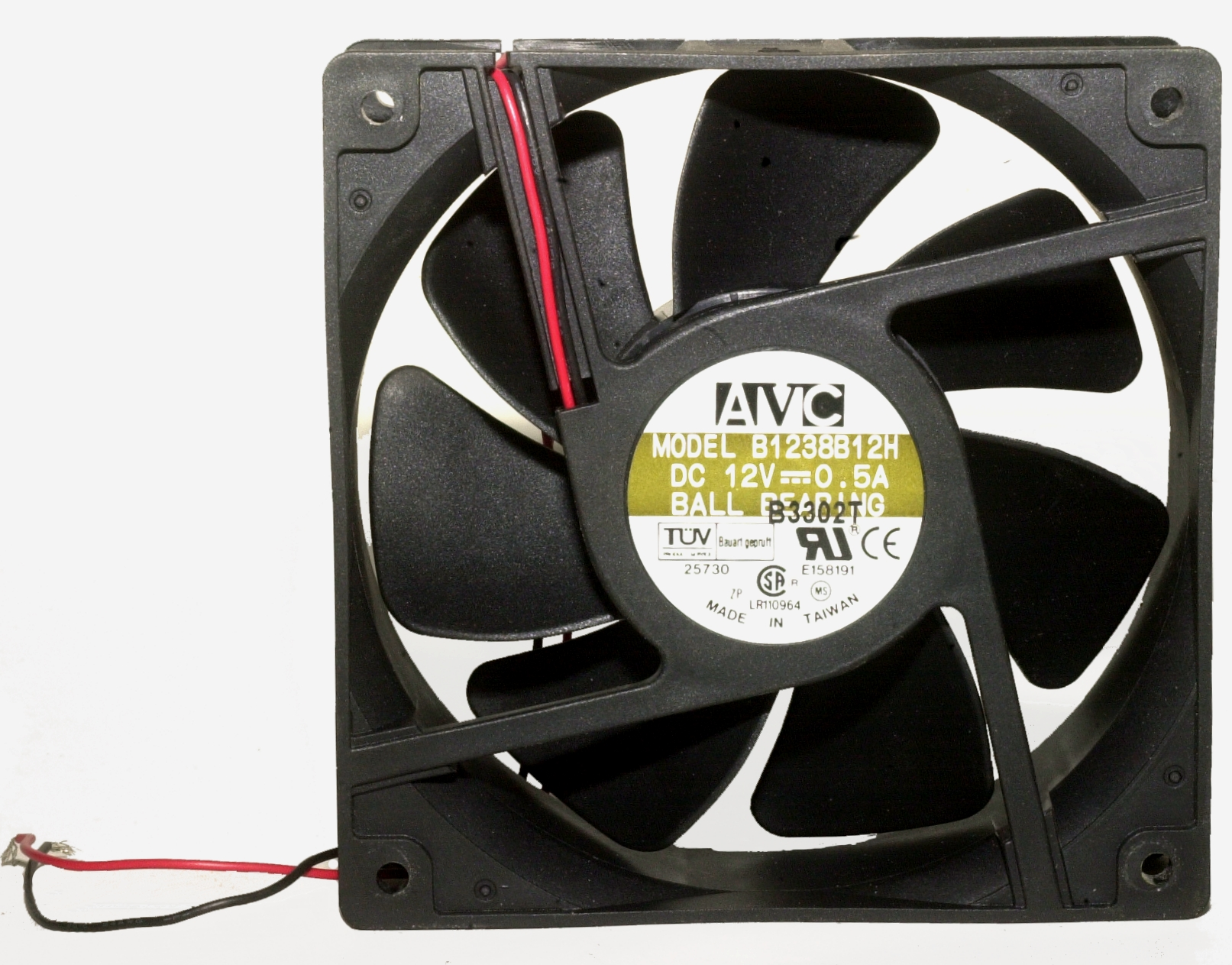
- AVC computer fan
- Native name: 奇鋐科技股份有限公司
- Type: Public
- Traded as: TWSE: 3017
- ISIN: TW0003017000
- Industry: Electronics
- Founded: 1991; 35 years ago
- Headquarters: Taipei, Taiwan
- Area served: Worldwide
- Products: Computer cooling
- Number of employees: 3022
- Website: www.avc.co

Asia Vital Components Co., Ltd. (AVC, Chinese: 奇鋐科技股份有限公司; pinyin: Qí Hóng Kējì Gǔfèn Yǒuxiàn Gōngsī) is a Taiwanese electronics company that produces computer cooling solutions. It was founded in 1991 and it is listed on the Taiwan Stock Exchange as ticker 3017, since 2002. As of November 2024, its market capitalization is 260 billion TWD (US$8 billion).

It is a pioneer in computer cooling systems, making it an important part of the computer hardware industry, especially AI.

AVC's main production bases are in China, Shenzhen, Wuhan, Shanghai, Dongguan and Chengdu. It opened factories in Vietnam in 2020.

The president of AVC is Ching-Hang Shen.

AVC's products include liquid cooling and computer fans for OEMs such as HP and Lenovo.
