= Avalon, Florida =

- Unincorporated community and Census-designated place
- Location of Avalon in Santa Rosa County, Florida.
- Coordinates: 30°32′08″N 87°06′47″W
- Country: United States
- State: Florida
- County: Santa Rosa

Area
  - Total: 4.146 sq mi (10.74 km^{2})
  - Land: 3.847 sq mi (9.96 km^{2})
  - Water: 0.299 sq mi (0.77 km^{2})
- Elevation: 10 ft (3.0 m)

Population (2020)
  - Total: 722
  - Density: 188/sq mi (72.5/km^{2})
- Time zone: UTC-6 (Central (CST))
  - Summer (DST): UTC-5 (CDT)
- ZIP code: 32583
- Area code: 850
- GNIS feature ID: 2629553

Avalon is an unincorporated community and census-designated place in Santa Rosa County, Florida. It is located south of Pace and Milton. The population was 722 at the 2020 census, up from 679 at the 2010 census. It is part of the Pensacola Metropolitan Area. Interstate 10 passes through the community.

== Geography ==
According to the U.S. Census Bureau, the community has an area of 4.146 square miles (10.74 km^{2}); 3.847 square miles (9.96 km^{2}) of its area is land, and 0.299 square miles (0.77 km^{2}) is water. It is known to have a rainy climate starting in the months of May and June and ending in October. The average temp is around 70 °F or 21 °C. The land contains small hills and small ponds.

== Demographics ==
Historical population
Census	Pop.	Note	%±
2010	679		—
2020	722		6.3%
U.S. Decennial Census

Avalon first appeared as a census designated place in the 2010 U.S. census.

=== Racial and ethnic composition ===
Avalon CDP, Florida – Racial and ethnic composition Note: the US Census treats Hispanic/Latino as an ethnic category. This table excludes Latinos from the racial categories and assigns them to a separate category. Hispanics/Latinos may be of any race.
Race / Ethnicity (NH = Non-Hispanic)	Pop 2010	Pop 2020	% 2010	% 2020
White alone (NH)	599	613	88.22%	84.90%
Black or African American alone (NH)	30	7	4.42%	0.97%
Native American or Alaska Native alone (NH)	12	7	1.77%	0.97%
Asian alone (NH)	4	3	0.59%	0.42%
Native Hawaiian or Pacific Islander alone (NH)	1	1	0.15%	0.14%
Other race alone (NH)	0	4	0.00%	0.55%
Mixed race or Multiracial (NH)	17	60	2.50%	8.31%
Hispanic or Latino (any race)	16	27	2.36%	3.74%
Total	679	722	100.00%	100.00%
