= Solar United Neighbors =

American nonprofit organization

- Abbreviation: SUN
- Formation: 2007
- Founder: Walter Schoolman, Diego Arene-Morley, Anya Schoolman
- Founded at: Mount Pleasant (Washington, D.C.)
- Website: solarunitedneighbors.org

Solar United Neighbors (SUN) is an American nonprofit organization that arranges solar co-ops for group purchase of home solar panel installations.

== History ==
The organization had its beginnings in 2007 when Walter Schoolman and his friend Diego Arene-Morley, both aged 12, watched the film An Inconvenient Truth. Following this, they asked their respective parents to install solar panels on their homes. Walter's mother, Anya Schoolman helped the two boys to found the Mt. Pleasant Solar Cooperative after their request and after discovering the high cost of retail solar installations. As a group, they convinced some of their neighbors to join together to increase their buying power for solar installations. The initial group had by 2009 installed solar panels for 45 homes in Washington D.C.’s Mt. Pleasant neighborhood.

In 2011 Anya Schoolman founded the national organization that would become Solar United Neighbors.

In 2018, SUN partnered with the American Solar Energy Society (ASES) in support of the US National Solar Tour, a tour of operational solar systems.

By March 2021, the effort had installed solar panels for 5,200 homes in the United States.

== Advocacy ==
Observers have noted that Solar United Neighbors seeks to influence government policy affecting solar panel installations and to install solar panels in ways that are socially just.

In 2021 SUN joined with the Institute for Local Self-Reliance and the Initiative for Energy Justice in the 30 Million Solar Homes campaign.

== Locations ==
SUN is active throughout the United States, including locations in Florida, Indiana, Minnesota, New Mexico, Ohio, Pennsylvania, Texas, Virginia, Washington, D.C. and West Virginia.

SUN has partnered with RMI in the United States.

Projects in some states, such as the Sunnyside Energy Community Solar project in Houston, offer resilience during extreme weather events.
