= Lavinia Engle =

Women's suffrage movement leader (1892-1979)

Lavinia Margaret Engle
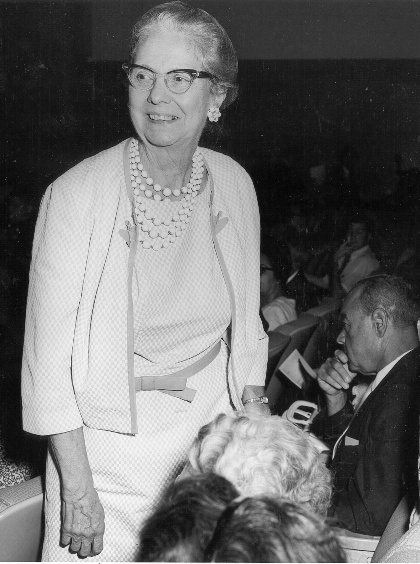
- Lavinia Margaret Engle in 1968
- Born: May 23, 1892; Forest Glen, Maryland, U.S.
- Died: May 29, 1979 (aged 87); Chevy Chase, Maryland, U.S.
- Known for: suffragist women's rights advocate Social Security Administration

Lavinia Margaret Engle (May 23, 1892 – May 29, 1979) was an American suffragist and politician. She was a member of the Maryland House of Delegates and Montgomery County Board of Commissioners, leader of the National American Woman Suffrage Association and Maryland League of Women Voters, and held positions within the Social Security Administration.

Engle was born in Forest Glen, Maryland, to James Melvin Engle, a Treasury Department official, and Lavinia Hauke Engle, who was an active suffragist. Lavinia Hauke Engle was the first president of the Montgomery League of Women Voters and a frequent speaker at women's clubs in Maryland. She testified before Congress for women's suffrage with Susan B. Anthony.

Lavinia Margaret Engle earned a BA from Antioch College in 1912. She would later return to school as the first female graduate student in political science at The Johns Hopkins University. After completing her BA, she joined the National American Woman Suffrage Association (NAWSA), where she became a suffrage campaign coordinator. She traveled extensively in the South and was particularly active in organizing the suffrage association in South Carolina. In 1919, she participated in the suffrage march in Washington, D.C. down Pennsylvania Avenue, which was met with violent opposition.

After passage of the 19th Amendment, Engle advocated for the continued need for groups advocating women's suffrage rights. After the dissolution of the NAWSA, Engle became a leader of the League of Women Voters. From 1921 to 1936 she served as executive director of the Maryland League of Women Voters. During this time, she pushed for legislation including the Juvenile Court Act, the establishment of a State Department of Infant and Maternal Hygiene, the establishment of the Commission on Almshouses, and the reorganization of the Board of State Aid to Charities. She served on the Commission on Reorganization of the State Administrative Departments in 1921 and the State Commission on Higher Education in 1930. In 1930, she ran for the Maryland House of Delegates from Montgomery County and won a seat. During her one term in office, she helped pass the Marriage Bill and introduced legislation for unemployment insurance.

In 1936, she left her post at the Maryland League of Women Voters and was appointed by Franklin Delano Roosevelt to the Social Security Administration, where she served until her retirement in 1966. She first acted as an educational representative, traveling the country to speak at college campuses and women's boards, but was soon promoted to Chief of Field Operations. In 1942, she was appointed Director of Region III, and in 1951, she became Assistant to the Commissioner of Social Security in charge of staff development. In 1963, she joined the Welfare Administration.
