= Aurantia, Florida =

Unincorporated community in Florida, U.S.

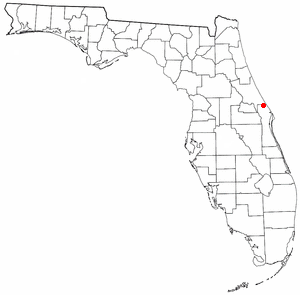

Aurantia was an unincorporated community in the north end of Brevard County, Florida, United States, at the intersection of Aurantia Road and the Florida East Coast Railway, where it was a station along the Enterprise Branch line.

== Geography ==
Aurantia was located at 28°43′40″N 80°53′16″W. It was bounded by the north by Scottsmoor; on the east by U.S. 1; on the south by Turnbull, Florida and on the west by the Volusia County line.

== Demise ==
The closing of the East Aurantia railroad station and abandonment of the track was the beginning of the end for the hamlet. The construction of Interstate 95 created a railroad overpass and split the community in half, forcing the relocation of many residents away from the crossroads and ending its identity. The area now is serviced by the post office at Mims, Florida.

== Rail Trail ==
The Florida Department of Environmental Protection took ownership of the rail bed on December 31, 2007, and a salvage company completed removal of the track in 2008. The 51 mile corridor is projected to become Florida's longest rails-to-trails project and will be named East Central Regional Rail-Trail (ECRRT). The purchase from Florida East Coast Railway was acquired using Florida Forever program money.

== See also ==
- List of former place names in Brevard County, Florida
- List of places in Florida: A
