= Mary A. Nolan =

American suffragist (1842-1925

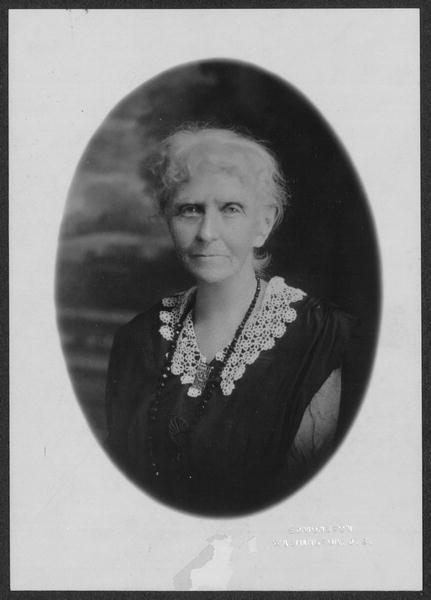
- Portrait of Nolan taken in the early 20th century
- Born: 1842; Martinsburg, Virginia, United States
- Died: May 19, 1925 (aged 82–83); Jacksonville, Florida, United States
- Education: Mont de Chantal
- Occupations: Suffragist; teacher
- Known for: Advocacy for women's suffrage

Mary A. Nolan (1842 – May 19, 1925) was an American suffragist known for her narrative recounting the Night of Terror. She spent much of her life in Jacksonville, Florida, and was often described as one of the oldest suffragists active on the National Woman's Party (NWP) picket lines. Sent to prison five times, she was the only suffragette from Florida to go to prison as a result of their activism. Nolan also became one of the first women to vote in Florida. She was buried at Evergreen Cemetery in Jacksonville.

== Biography ==
=== Activism ===
Mary A. Nolan was born in Martinsburg, Virginia in 1842 and attended Mont de Chantal in West Virginia. As a young woman she worked as a teacher and leader in the Southern library movement. She was also prominent in Confederate organizations and a suffrage pioneer. She was the wife of a Southern Railway Company superintendent and also worked with the Red Cross.

In 1917 she joined the National Woman's Party (NWP) and came to Washington, D.C., to take her place among the women demanding liberty. She was arrested on November 10, 1917, and sentenced to six days in District Jail, but was actually sent to Occoquan Workhouse. Of the thirty one picketers arrested that day, Nolan was given the lightest sentence (six days) on account of her age. The judge, believing prison would be too severe and harsh for an older women, urged Mrs. Nolan to pay her fine instead. In response, she allegedly said “Your honor, I have a nephew fighting for democracy in France. He is offering his life for his country. I should be ashamed if I did not join these brave women in their fight for democracy in America. I should be proud of the honor to die in prison for the liberty of American women." She was there for the "Night of Terror" on November 15, 1917, during which guards turned violent and attacked imprisoned protesters. Days after she was released, Nolan wrote an article for The Suffragist and published a narrative describing in detail her experience at Occoquan Workhouse. Though she only spent a short time in the prison, Nolan's narrative provided the first full account of The Night of Terror.

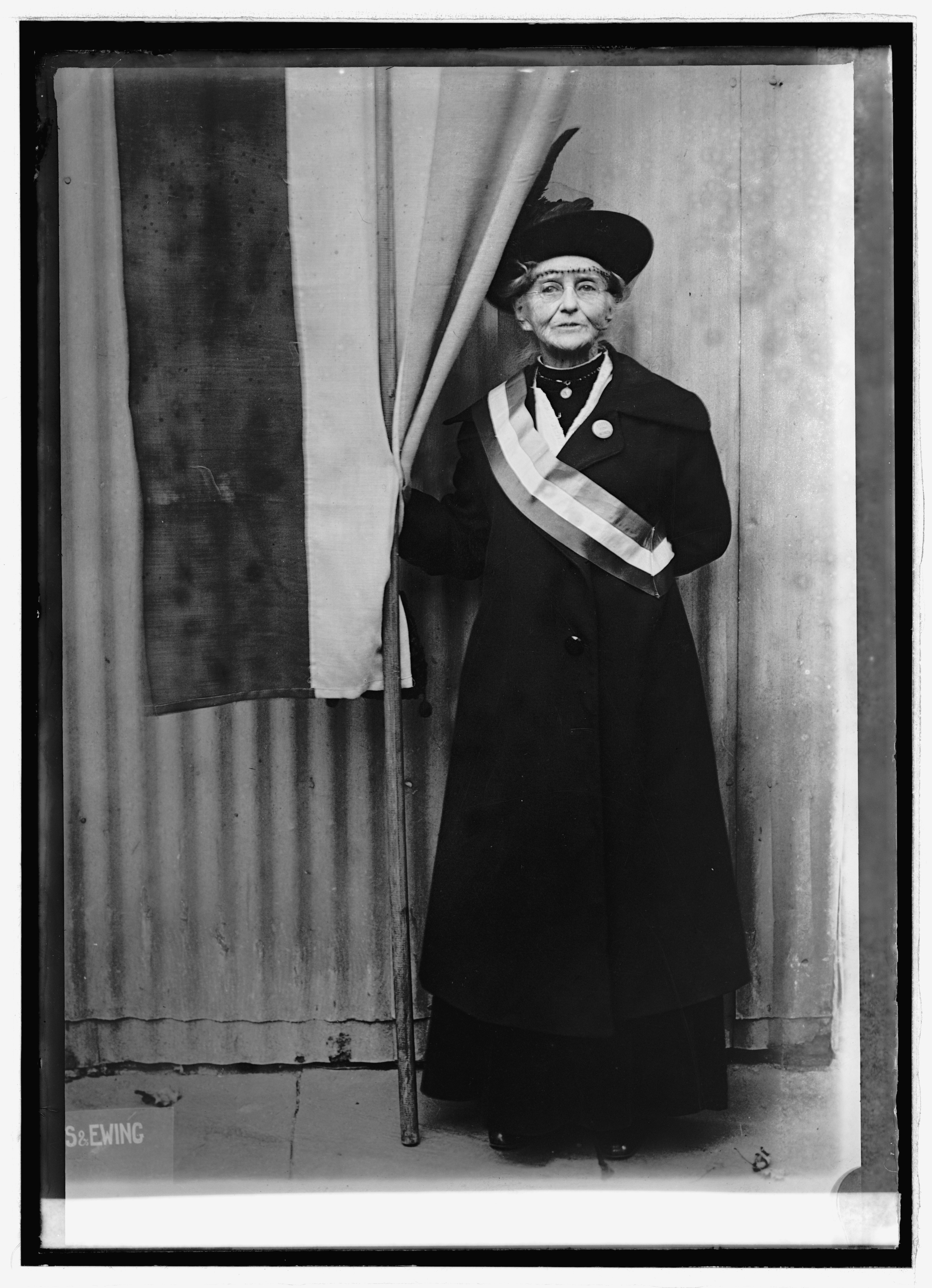
Mary A. Nolan in 1921 with the suffrage banner

=== After the Night of Terror ===
Nolan and seven other prisoners attempted to sue the District of Columbia Commissioners, Warden Zinkham of the District Jail, Superintendent Whittaker, and Captain Ream of the Occoquan Workhouse for cruel and brutal treatment, but they eventually dropped the cases as they stood little chance of winning. By February 4, 1919, she had been arrested nine times during the Silent Sentinels demonstrations outside the White House. She participated in the nationwide Prison Special tour in which NWP activists traveled from city to city speaking of their experiences in jail. Nolan vowed to never give up the fight, saying "I am old, I guess, but if I were a hundred I would do just as I am doing now. I am willing to use every drop of life left in me to push this fight to its end." In the spring of 1925, Nolan died at the age of eighty two of natural causes. She would be arrested a total of ten times and jailed five times throughout her life.

== Legacy ==
Because of her outstanding efforts in the suffragist movement, Jacksonville and the local chapter of the National Organization for Women (NOW) celebrate “Mary Nolan Day” every August 26. Nolan’s prison narrative, entitled That Night of Terror gave the full account of how suffragists were treated during her time in prison which resulted in the remaining prisoners’ release and the firing of W.H. Whitaker, the superintendent of the Occoquan Workhouse.

Originally buried in an unmarked grave, the Jacksonville NOW chapter honored her legacy by giving her a headstone in 1982. The stone was engraved with a quote from Nolan herself, saying "I am guilty if there is any guilt in a demand for freedom."
