= Zena Dreier =

American suffragette

Zena M. Dreier was the first woman to cast a ballot in a municipal non-school election in Florida and the Southern United States.

== History ==
Fellsmere, Florida was incorporated as a town in February of 1915. Its incorporation included a provision granting women the right to vote.

Dreier stated that she added a line to Fellsmore's incorporation papers giving women the right to vote. The line went unnoticed and the papers were signed by the governor.

Dreier cast a ballot in a Fellsmore city election on June 19, 1915, five years before the 19th Amendment was signed. This made her the first woman in Florida as well as the first women in the Southern United States to cast a ballot in a municipal non-school election.

== Legacy ==
A historical marker on Fellsmore's North Broad Street recognizes Fellsmore as the "Birthplace for Equal Suffrage for Women in Florida".
