= Eleanor McWilliams Chamberlain =

American women's rights advocate

Eleanor "Ella" Collier McWilliams Chamberlain (née McWilliams; born September 1848; died July 1934) was an American women's rights activist and journalist who has been credited with starting the women's suffrage movement in Florida. Chamberlain was born in Mahaska County, Iowa, in September 1848, and moved to Florida in the early 1880s after she married. In the early 1890s, she organized the Florida Women's Suffrage Association and began writing articles for the "Tampa Weekly Tribune." "The Tampa Tribune" claims that Chamberlain "may have been Florida's first 'suffragette.'"

== Biography ==
Chamberlain was born in Mahaska County, Iowa, in September 1848, the oldest child of Samuel and Sarah (Jones) McWilliams. The oldest of five, she had two sisters and a brother survive to adulthood. She attended Oskaloosa College in Iowa in the 1860s.

She married Fielding P. Chamberlain (1824–1899), who was 24 years her senior, in Oskaloosa, Iowa, in the early 1870s; she was his second wife. His first wife, Elizabeth Breckenridge, had died a few years earlier. By 1880, the couple was living in Kansas and had taken in Ella's two younger siblings, Katie, age 16, and Gus, age 12. They cared for her younger siblings for several years; she never had children of her own. They moved from Ella's home state of Iowa to Florida in 1881, and settled in Tampa in 1883. After attending a women's rights convention in Des Moines, Iowa, in 1892, she began using the newspaper column that she wrote in the "Tampa Weekly Tribune" to further the cause.

In January 1893, she organized a group of about 100 women into the Florida Women's Suffrage Association, who then affiliated with the National American Woman Suffrage Association. Chamberlain and her husband attended the association's national convention in 1895. She became an acquaintance of Susan B. Anthony and sent her a box of Florida oranges each year for Christmas. When Chamberlain moved away from Florida in 1897, the Florida suffrage movement essentially collapsed until 1913.

She moved back to Florida in the early 1900s, after her husband had died. Chamberlain wrote and published several items and was also known for visiting prisoners. She also advocated for a "mother's pension" to support widows raising children, and in later life she was an advocate for prisoners in jail and for hospital care for people of African descent. Chamberlain died on July 15, 1934, in Tampa, FL. A bust of her is on the Tampa Riverwalk. Chamberlain has been described as "Tampa's best-known suffragist".
