= Assurance of voluntary compliance =

In American law, an assurance of voluntary compliance is a legal device entered into between a state attorney general and an individual or business that the attorney general believes has or may in the future violate a consumer protection law. An assurance is not an admission of guilt. Although parties voluntarily enter into assurances, when violated they have the same force of law as "any injunction, judgment [or] final court order".
