= Solar power in the United States =

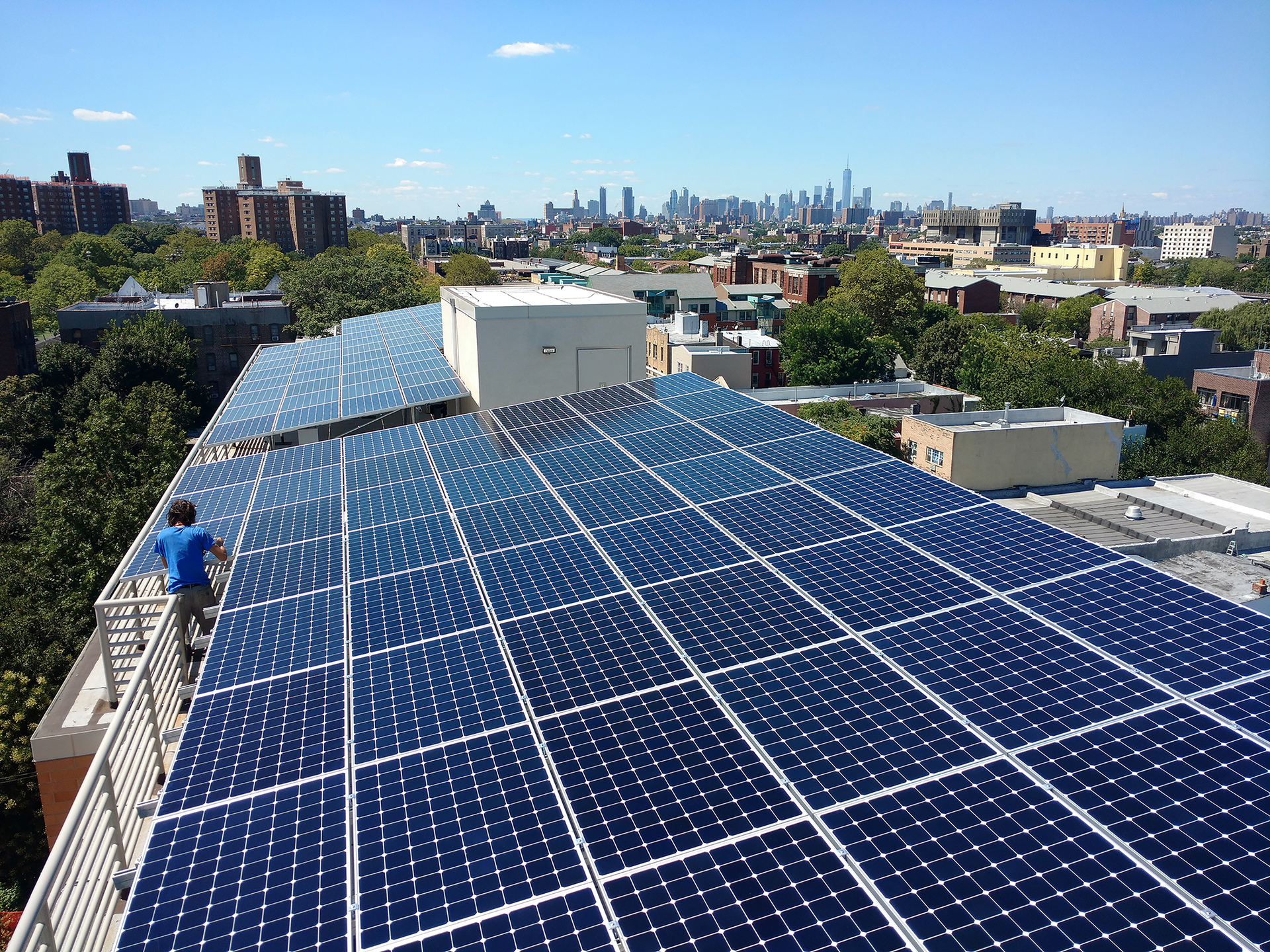
Solar panels on a rooftop in New York City

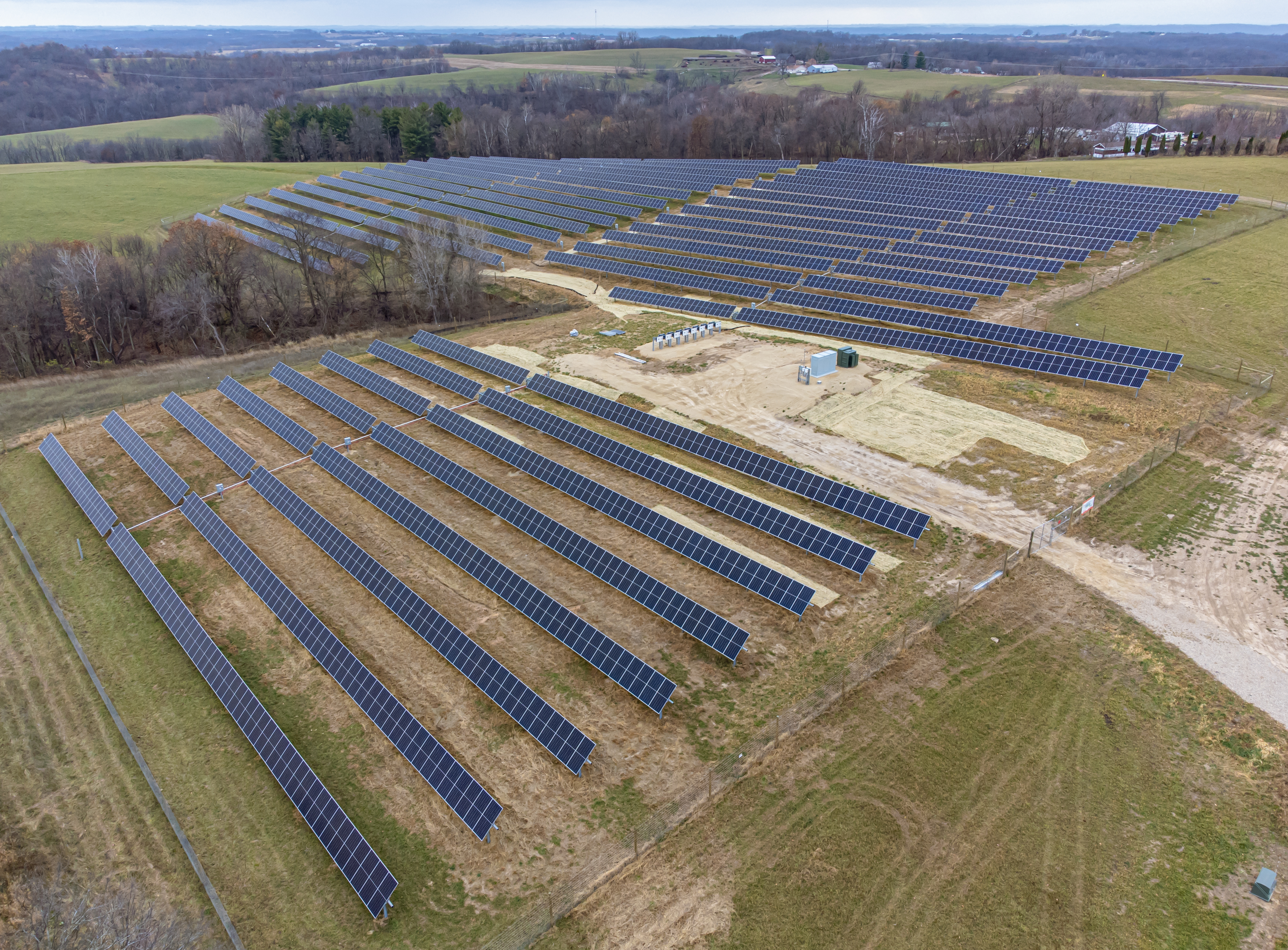
Community solar farm in Wheatland, Wisconsin

Solar power includes solar farms as well as local distributed generation, mostly on rooftops and increasingly from community solar arrays. In 2025, utility-scale solar power generated 300.3 terawatt-hours (TWh) in the United States. Total solar generation that year, including estimated small-scale photovoltaic generation, was 393.3 TWh.

As of the end of 2024, the United States had 239 gigawatts (GW) of installed photovoltaic (utility and small scale) and concentrated solar power capacity combined. This capacity is exceeded only by China and the European Union. In 2024, 66% of all new electricity generation capacity in the U.S. came from solar.

The United States conducted much early research in photovoltaics and concentrated solar power. It is among the top countries in the world in electricity generated by the sun and several of the world's largest utility-scale installations are located in the desert Southwest. The oldest solar power plant in the world is the 354-megawatt (MW) Solar Energy Generating Systems thermal power plant in California. The Ivanpah Solar Electric Generating System is a solar thermal power project in the Mojave Desert, 40 miles (64 km) southwest of Las Vegas, with a gross capacity of 392 MW. The 280 MW Solana Generating Station is a solar power plant near Gila Bend, Arizona, about 70 miles (110 km) southwest of Phoenix, completed in 2013. When commissioned it was the largest parabolic trough plant in the world and the first U.S. solar plant with molten salt thermal energy storage. By 2015, solar employment had overtaken oil and gas as well as coal employment in the United States. As of 2023, more than 280,000 Americans were employed in the solar industry.

Many states have set individual renewable energy goals with solar power being included in various proportions. Hawaii plans 100% renewable-sourced electricity by 2045. Governor Jerry Brown signed legislation requiring California's utilities to obtain 100 percent of their electricity from zero-carbon sources by the end of 2045 (including 60% renewable energy sources by 2030).

== Solar potential ==
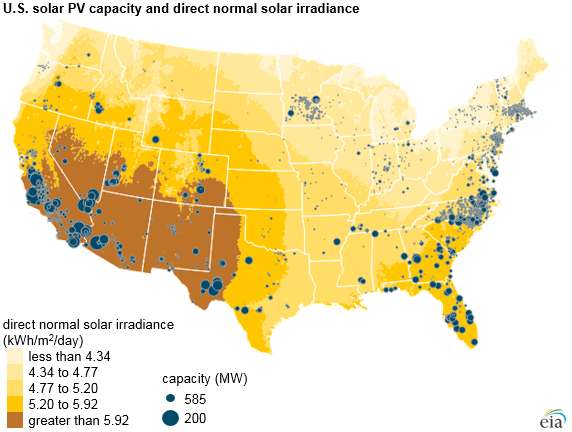
An insolation map of the United States with installed PV capacity, 2019

A 2012 report from the National Renewable Energy Laboratory (NREL) described technically available renewable energy resources for each state and estimated that urban utility-scale photovoltaics could supply 2,232 TWh/year, rural utility-scale PV 280,613 TWh/year, rooftop PV 818 TWh/year, and CSP 116,146 TWh/year, for a total of almost 400,000 TWh/year, 100 times the consumption of 3,856 TWh in 2011. For comparison, onshore wind potential is estimated at 32,784 TWh/year, and offshore wind at 16,976 TWh/year, while the total available from all renewable resources is estimated at 481,963 TWh/year.

Renewable energy is the least expensive source of power generation as of 2023, even considering the upfront cost of installation. Therefore, the economics of the renewable energy transition are highly favorable unlike in prior decades. Solar is second only to onshore wind turbines in levelized cost of electricity competitiveness. Replacing historical sources of fossil energy (coal, oil, and natural gas) with solar and wind results in lower operating costs for utility providers and lower energy costs for consumers. This does not include the significant additional health and mortality burden to society from fossil fuel use that makes it even more expensive than it appears.

== History ==
New installation of wind and solar capacity surged in 2020, but was then affected by sourcing problems for solar panels, supply chain constraints, interconnection issues, and policy uncertainty.

Utility-scale solar (yellow) and small-scale solar (orange) have shown the largest percentage growth since 2010 in renewable-source electricity generation.

The Carter administration provided major subsidies for research into photovoltaic technology and sought to increase commercialization in the industry.

In the early 1980s, the US accounted for more than 85% of the solar market.

During the Reagan administration, oil prices decreased and the US removed most of its policies that supported its solar industry. Government subsidies were higher in Germany and Japan, which prompted the industrial supply chain to begin moving from the US to those countries.

Solar energy deployment increased at a record pace in the United States and throughout the world in 2008, according to industry reports. The Solar Energy Industries Association's "2008 U.S. Solar Industry Year in Review" found that U.S. solar energy capacity increased by 17% in 2007, reaching the total equivalent of 8,775 megawatts (MW). The SEIA report tallies all types of solar energy, and in 2007 the United States installed 342 MW of solar photovoltaic (PV) electric power, 139 thermal megawatts (MW_{th}) of solar water heating, 762 MW_{th} of pool heating, and 21 MW_{th} of solar space heating and cooling.

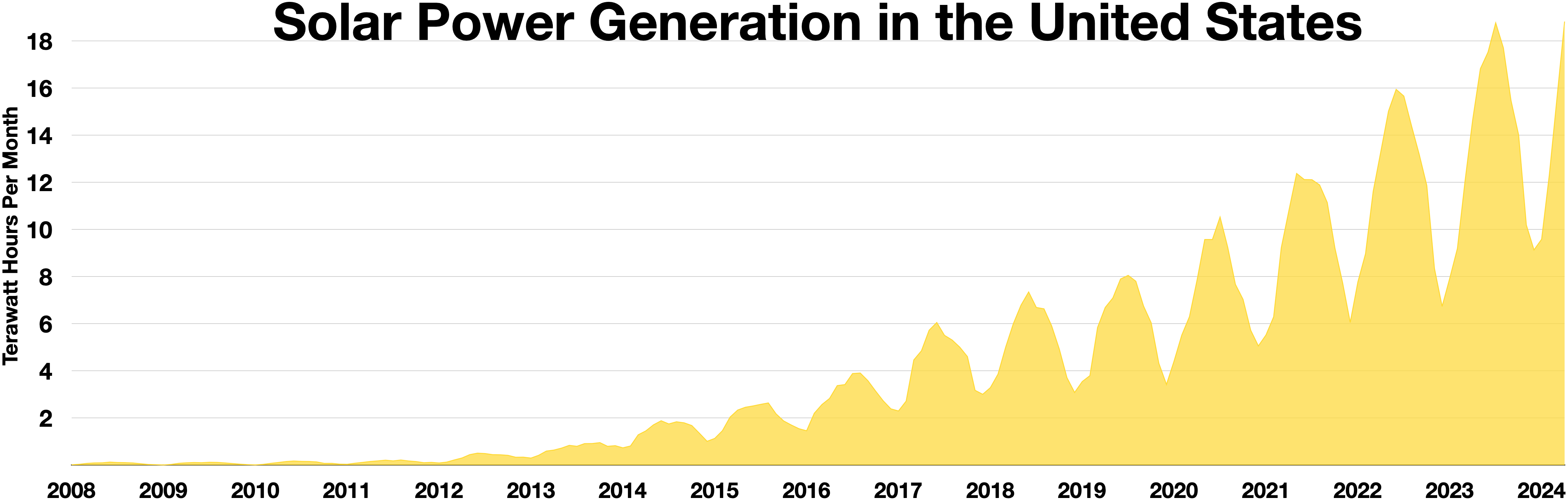
Solar power generation in the United States

Another report in 2008 by research and publishing firm Clean Edge and the nonprofit Co-op America found that solar power's contribution could grow to 10% of the nation's power needs by 2025, with nearly 2% of the nation's electricity coming from concentrating solar power systems, while solar photovoltaic systems would provide more than 8% of the nation's electricity. Those figures correlate to nearly 50,000 megawatts of solar photovoltaic systems and more than 6,600 megawatts of concentrating solar power.

The report noted that the cost per kilowatt-hour of solar photovoltaic systems had been dropping, while electricity generated from fossil fuels was becoming more expensive. As a result, the report projects that solar power was expected to reach cost parity with conventional power sources in many U.S. markets by 2015. To reach the 10% goal, solar photovoltaic companies would need to make solar power a "plug-and-play technology", or simplify the deployment of solar systems. The report also underlines the importance of future "smart grid" technologies.

Solar Energy Industries Association and GTM Research found that the amount of new solar electric capacity increased in 2012 by 76 percent from 2011, raising the United States’ market share of the world's installations above 10 percent, up from roughly 5 to 7 percent in the past seven years. According to the U.S. Energy Information Administration, as of September 2014 utility-scale solar had sent 12,303 gigawatt-hours of electricity to the U.S. grid. This was an increase of over 100% versus the same period in 2013 (6,048 GWh). The number of homes with solar systems installed had been increasing rapidly, from 30,000 in 2006 to 1.3 million in 2016. A 2014 study by the U.S. Department of Energy predicted the figure could reach 3.8 million homes by 2020.

== Solar photovoltaic power ==
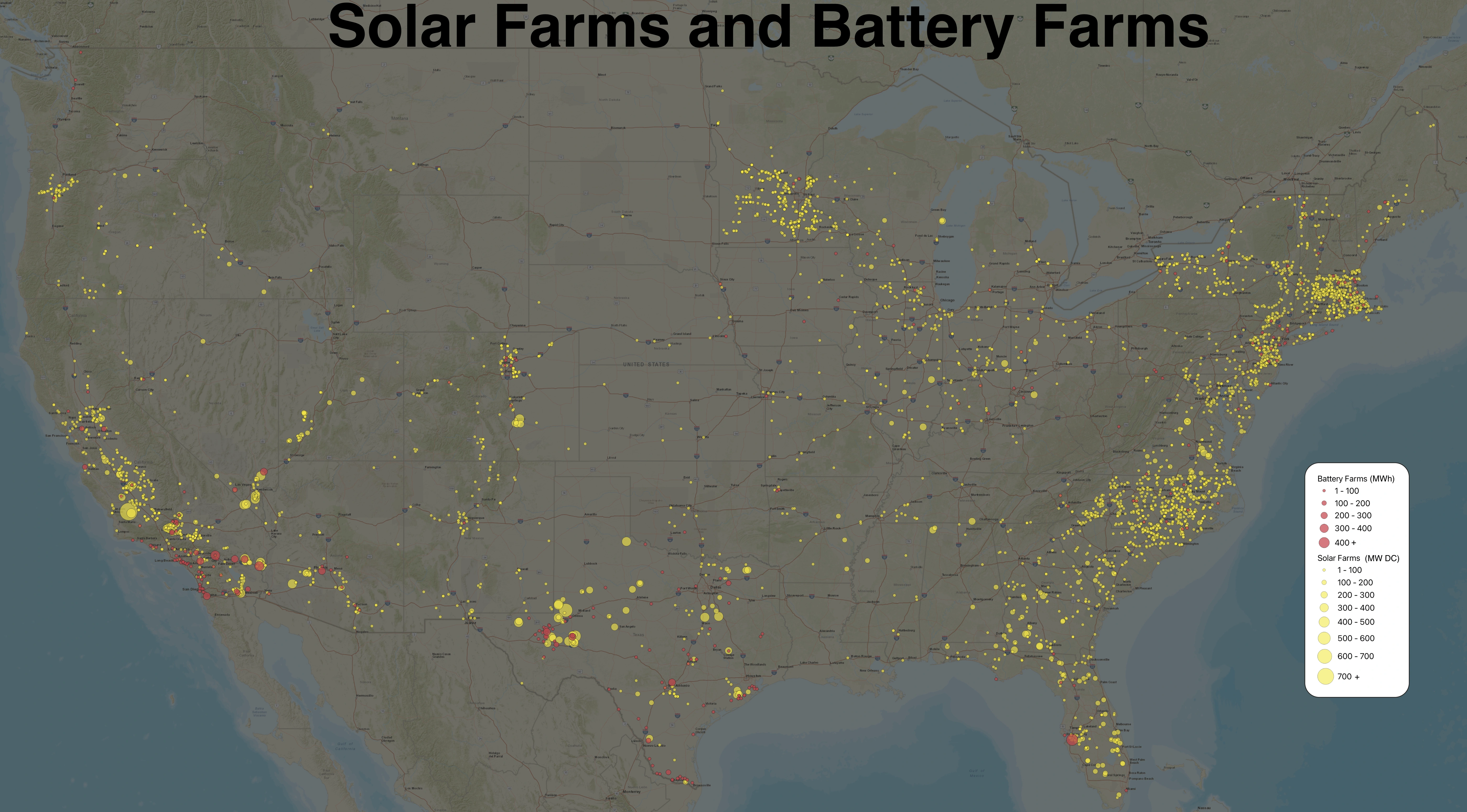
Solar farms and battery farms in the United States

=== Solar PV installed capacity ===
Solar PV capacity in the United States by year
Year	Total (MWp)	YOY growth	Installed capacity (MWp)
2010	2,094		849
2011	4,039	93%	1,941
2012	7,416	84%	3,374
2013	12,220	64%	4,766
2014	18,464	51%	6,245
2015	25,944	41%	7,509
2016	41,176	58%	15,104
2017	52,284	27%	11,080
2018	63,015	21%	10,733
2019	76,552	21%	13,512
2020	96,458	26%	19,849
2021	120,503	24%	23,565
2022	140,005	16%	19,502
2023	179,000	28%	38,995
2024	229,000	28%	50,000
2025	272,200	19%	43,200

U.S. grid-connected photovoltaic capacity by state (MW_{P})
No	Jurisdiction	2015	2014	2013	2012	2011	2010	2009	2008	2007
–	United States	25,459	18,173	12,090.2	7,373.8	4,010.7	2,165.7	1,261.6	791.7	474.8
1	California	13,243	9,977	5,183.4	2,559.3	1,563.6	1,021.7	768.0	528.3	328.8
2	Arizona	2,303	2,069	1,563.1	1,106.4	397.6	109.8	46.2	25.3	18.9
3	North Carolina	2,087	1,245	469.0	207.9	85.5	40.0	12.5	4.7	0.7
4	New Jersey	1,632	1,574	1,184.6	955.7	565.9	259.9	127.5	70.2	43.6
5	Nevada	1,240	823	424.0	349.7	124.1	104.7	36.4	34.2	18.8
6	Massachusetts	1,020	734	445.0	207.3	74.6	38.2	17.7	7.5	4.6
7	New York	638	394	240.5	179.4	123.8	55.5	33.9	21.9	15.4
8	Hawaii	564	447	358.2	199.5	85.2	44.7	26.2	13.5	4.5
9	Colorado	544	396	360.4	299.6	196.7	121.1	59.1	35.7	14.6
10	Texas	534	330	215.9	140.3	85.6	34.5	8.6	4.4	3.2
11	Georgia	370	161	109.9	21.4	6.9	1.8	0.2	<0.1	<0.1
12	New Mexico	365	325	256.6	203.4	165.5	43.3	2.4	1.0	0.5
13	Maryland	349	205	175.4	116.8	37.1	12.8	5.6	3.1	0.7
14	Pennsylvania	258	245	180.2	164.3	133.1	54.8	7.3	3.9	0.9
15	Utah	255	24	16.0	10.0	4.4	2.1	0.6	0.2	0.2
16	Connecticut	219	128	77.1	39.6	31.1	24.6	19.7	8.8	2.8
17	Florida	200	159	137.3	116.9	95.0	73.5	38.7	3.0	2.0
18	Indiana	136	112	49.4	4.4	3.5	0.5	0.3	<0.1	<0.1
19	Missouri	131	111	48.9	18.5	2.0	0.7	0.2	<0.1	<0.1
20	Tennessee	129	118	64.8	45.0	22.0	5.7	0.9	0.4	0.4
21	Oregon	114	84	62.8	56.4	35.8	23.9	14.0	7.7	2.8
22	Ohio	113	102	98.4	79.9	31.6	20.7	2.0	1.4	1.0
23	Vermont	107	64	41.5	28.0	11.7	3.9	1.7	1.1	0.7
24	Louisiana	92	60	46.6	18.2	13.4	2.6	0.2	<0.1	<0.1
25	Delaware	70	61	62.8	46.1	26.5	5.6	3.2	1.8	1.2
26	Illinois	65	54	43.4	42.9	16.2	15.5	4.5	2.8	2.2
27	Washington	62	39	27.4	19.5	12.3	8.0	5.2	3.7	1.9
28	Minnesota	33	20	15.1	11.3	4.8	3.6	1.9	1.0	0.5
29	Iowa	27	21	4.6	1.2	0.1	<0.1	<0.1	<0.1	<0.1
30	Wisconsin	25	20	22.5	21.1	12.9	8.7	5.3	3.1	1.4
31	New Hampshire	22	7.0	4.0	2.0	2.0	2.0	0.7	0.1	0.1
32	Virginia	21	11	12.6	10.5	4.5	2.8	0.8	0.2	0.2
33	Arkansas	20.1	3.8	1.8	1.5	1.1	1.0	0.2	<0.1	<0.1
34	Maine	19.4	12.7	5.3	2.8	1.1	0.3	0.3	0.3	0.2
35	Michigan	19	14	12	10	8.8	2.6	0.7	0.4	0.4
36	Rhode Island	17.1	12.6	7.6	1.9	1.2	0.6	0.6	0.6	0.6
37	D.C.	17	10	16.5	13.9	11.6	4.5	1.0	0.7	0.5
38	South Carolina	15	12	8.0	4.6	4.1	0.9	0.1	<0.1	<0.1
39	Kentucky	9.5	8.4	7.9	4.8	3.3	0.2	<0.1	<0.1	<0.1
40	Oklahoma	5.2	1.5	0.7	0.3	0.2	<0.1	<0.1	<0.1	<0.1
41	Kansas	4.7	2.3	1.1	0.5	0.2	<0.1	<0.1	<0.1	<0.1
42	Idaho	4.6	2.6	1.8	1.0	0.4	0.4	0.2	<0.1	<0.1
43	Montana	4.5	4.0	3.0	2.2	0.7	0.7	0.7	0.7	0.5
44	West Virginia	3.4	2.6	2.2	1.7	0.6	<0.1	<0.1	<0.1	<0.1
45	Alabama	2.0	1.9	1.9	1.1	0.5	0.4	0.2	<0.1	<0.1
46	Wyoming	1.5	1.2	1.0	0.6	0.2	0.2	0.1	<0.1	<0.1
47	Mississippi	1.1	1.0	1.0	0.7	0.6	0.3	0.1	<0.1	<0.1
48	Nebraska	1.1	0.8	0.6	0.4	0.3	0.2	<0.1	<0.1	<0.1
49	Alaska	0.72	0.39	0.2	<0.1	<0.1	<0.1	<0.1	<0.1	<0.1
50	South Dakota	0.24	0.22	<0.1	<0.1	<0.1	<0.1	<0.1	<0.1	<0.1
51	North Dakota	0.22	0.22	0.2	0.1	<0.1	<0.1	<0.1	<0.1	<0.1

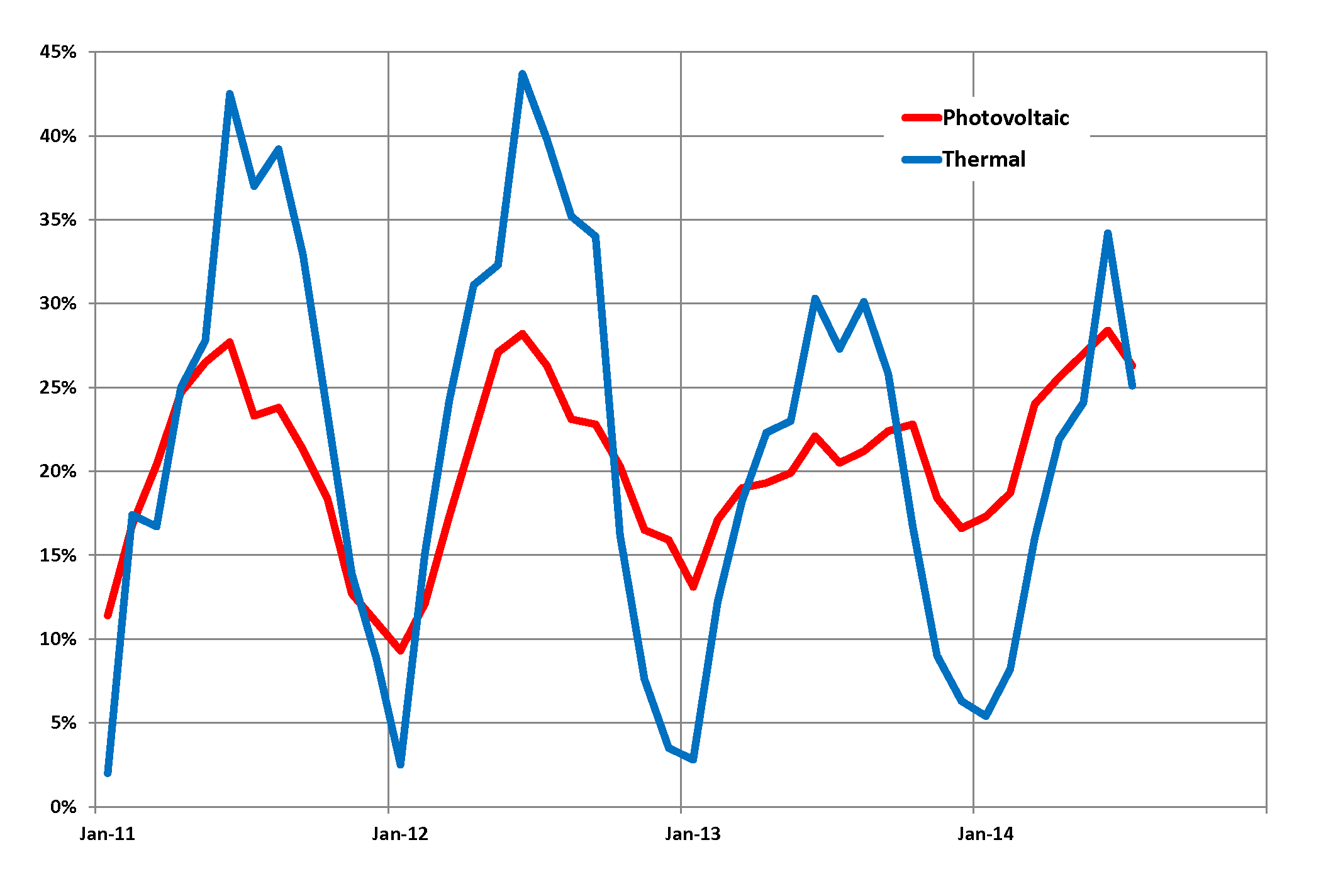
Average monthly capacity factors for electricity generation by utility-scale solar plants, 2011–2014. Data from the U.S. Energy Information Administration.

In the United States, 14,626 MW of PV was installed in 2016, a 95% increase over 2015 (7,493 MW). During 2016, 22 states added at least 100 MW of capacity. Just 4,751 MW of PV installations were completed in 2013. The U.S. had approximately 440 MW of off-grid photovoltaics as of the end of 2010. Through the end of 2005, a majority of photovoltaics in the United States was off-grid.

In 2023 the total capacity deployed was 35.3 GW, which is 52% greater than 2022 at just 24 GW.

=== Solar PV generation ===
Solar photovoltaic generation in the United States
Year	Utility-scale							Est. distributed generation (GWh)	Est. total generation (GWh)
Year	Summer capacity (GW)	Generation (GWh)	Cap. factor	Capacity YOY growth	Generation YOY growth	Portion of renewable electricity	Portion of total electricity	Est. distributed generation (GWh)	Est. total generation (GWh)
2004		6				0.002%	0.0002%	N/A	N/A
2005		16			166.7%	0.004%	0.0004%	N/A	N/A
2006		15			−6.3%	0.004%	0.0004%	N/A	N/A
2007	36.7	16			6.7%	0.005%	0.0004%	N/A	N/A
2008	70.8	76		91.9%	375%	0.02%	0.0018%	N/A	N/A
2009	145.5	157		105.6%	106.6%	0.04%	0.004%	N/A	N/A
2010	393.4	423	20.2%	171%	150.3%	0.1%	0.01%	N/A	N/A
2011	1,052.0	1,012	19.0%	167.7%	139.2%	0.2%	0.02%	N/A	N/A
2012	2,694.1	3,451	20.4%	156.1%	241%	0.7%	0.09%	N/A	N/A
2013	5,336.1	8,121	24.5%	98.1%	135.3%	1.56%	0.2%	N/A	N/A
2014	8,656.6	15,250	25.6%	62.2%	87.8%	2.83%	0.37%	11,233	26,482
2015	11,905.4	21,666	25.5%	37.5%	42.1%	3.98%	0.53%	14,139	35,805
2016	20,192.9	32,670	25.0%	69.6%	50.8%	5.36%	0.8%	18,812	51,483
2017	25,209.0	50,018	25.6%	24.8%	53.1%	7.29%	1.24%	23,990	74,008
2018	30,120.5	60,234	25.1%	19.5%	20.4%	8.52%	1.44%	29,539	89,773
2019	35,710.2	68,719	24.3%	18.6%	14.1%	9.43%	1.66%	34,957	103,676
2020	46,306.2	86,066	24.2%	29.7%	25.2%	10.99%	2.15%	41,522	127,588
2021	59,534.5	111,755	24.6%	28.7%	29.8%	13.52%	2.72%	49,025	160,779

The amount of electricity a unit is capable of producing over an extended period of time is determined by multiplying the capacity by the capacity factor. The capacity factor for solar photovoltaic units is largely a function of climate and latitude and so varies significantly from state to state. The National Renewable Energy Laboratory has calculated that the highest statewide average solar voltaic capacity factors are in Arizona, New Mexico, and Nevada (each 26.3 percent), and the lowest is Alaska (10.5 percent). The lowest statewide average capacity factor in the contiguous 48 states is in West Virginia (17.2 percent).

=== Solar power by type ===
Solar generation (utility-scale and estimated small-scale PV + thermal) in the United States in 2021
	Summer capacity (GW)	Electricity generation (GWh)	Yearly growth of produced energy	Capacity factor
PV (utility-scale)	59,535	111,755	29.85%	24.6%
PV (small-scale)	32,972	49,025	18.07%	17%
Thermal	1,631	2,924	−6.67%	20.5%

The table above gives an indication of the spread of solar power between the different types at the end of 2021. Capacity figures may seem smaller than those quoted by other sources and it is likely that the capacities are measured in MW AC rather than MW DC, the former of which gives a lower reading due to conversion losses during the process by which power is transformed by inverters from direct current to alternating current.

=== Large-scale PV facilities ===
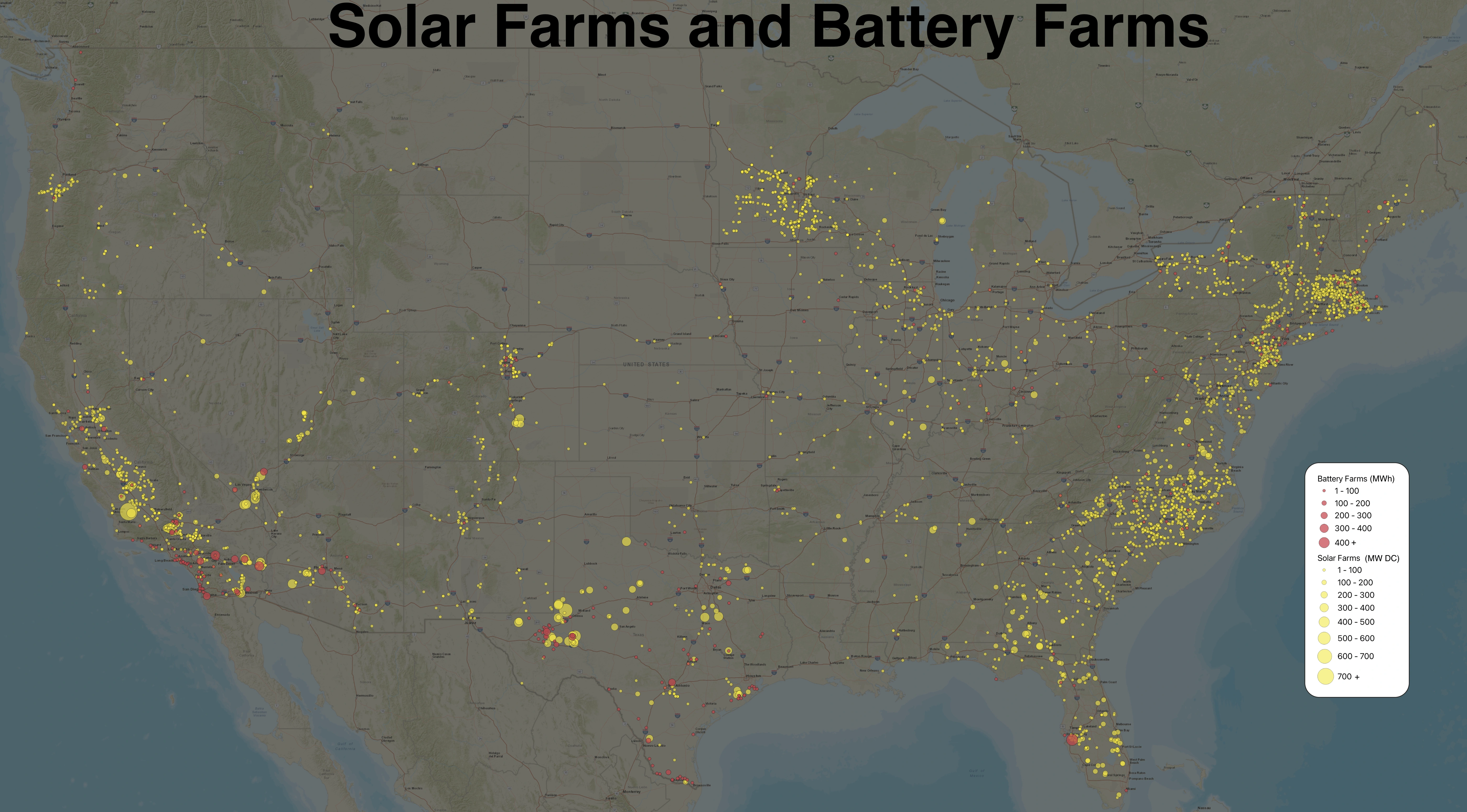
Solar farms and battery farms in the United States

Large-scale photovoltaic power plants in the United States often consist of two or more units which correspond to construction stages and/or technology-improvement phases of a particular development project. Typically these units are co-located in the vicinity of the same high-capacity transmission substation, and may also feed that substation with other large PV plants which are adjacently sited but separately developed.

An objector at non-profit “Basin and Range Watch” to the Riverside East Solar Energy Zone in the California desert said in 2023 that "solar plants create myriad environmental problems, including habitat destruction and 'lethal death traps' for birds, which dive at the panels, mistaking them for water ... one project bulldozed 600 acres of designated critical habitat for the endangered desert tortoise, while populations of Mojave fringe-toed lizards and bighorn sheep have also been afflicted." The same article included many other examples of how the same solar project had hurt the desert flora and fauna, according to environmentalists.

Largest solar plants in the US
Name	State	Location	Capacity (MWdc unless stated)	Owner	Year	Notes
Mammoth Solar	Indiana	40°59′45″N 86°49′19″W	1,600	Doral Renewables	2026	1,300 MW_{AC}, built in four stages
Copper Mountain Solar Facility	Nevada		802 (ac)	Sempra Generation Solar		Built in five stages
Gemini Solar Project	Nevada		966		2024	690 MW_{AC}, with 380 MW of batteries
Edwards Sanborn Solar and Energy Storage Project	California		864		2023	3,320 MWh battery storage
Lumina I and II Solar Project	Texas		828		2024	640 MWac
Mount Signal Solar	California		794		2020	Phase 1 of 206 MW_{AC} in May 2014. Phase 3 of 254 MW_{AC} in July 2018. Phase 2 of 154 MW_{AC} completed in January 2020. Total 614 MW_{AC}
Solar star I & II	California	34°48′58.9″N 118°24′08.2″W 34°50′56.0″N 118°21′10.6″W	747		2015	579 MW_{AC}, was world's largest when completed.
Prospero Solar I and II	Texas		710		2021	550 MW_{AC}
Westlands Solar Park	California		672 (ac)		2023	Solar park, up to 2000 MW_{AC} when completed
Frye Solar Power Plant	Texas		637		2024	500 MWac
Roseland Solar	Texas		640		2023	500 MWac
Atkina Solar Power Plant	Texas		631		2024	500 MWac
Spotsylvania Solar Energy Project	Virginia		617		2021	
Taygete Solar	Texas		602		2023	459 MWac, built in two phases - Taygete I of 255 MWac and Taygete II of 204 MWac
Desert Sunlight Solar Farm	California	33°49′33″N 115°24′08″W	550 (ac)		2015	Phase I of 300 MW_{AC} completed 2013. Phase II to final capacity completed January 2015.
Topaz	California	35°23′00″N 120°04′00″W	585.9		2014	550 MWac
Mesquite Solar project	Arizona	33°20′N 112°55′W	513 (ac)		2016	Up to 700 MW_{AC} when complete. Fifth phase completed in January 2024.
Oberon Solar Project	California		500		2023	250 MW battery storage
Roadrunner Solar Project	Texas		497		2019	
Daggett Solar	California		482		2023	280 MW of energy storage
McCoy/Blythe Mesa Solar Power Project	California	33°43′00″N 114°45′00″W	485	NextEra Energy		
Mammoth Solar	Indiana		480		2024	First of three phases to total 1,600 MW.
Permian Energy Center	Texas		460 (ac)		2019	
Red-Tailed Hawk	Texas		458		2024	
Texas Solar Nova	Texas		452		2024	

=== Distributed generation ===
Within the cumulative PV capacity in the United States, there has been growth in the distributed generation segment, which are all grid-connected PV installations in the residential and non-residential markets. Non-residential market includes installations on commercial, government, school and non-profit organization properties.

Between 2000 and 2013 there was 2,261 MW of residential solar and 4,051 MW non-residential solar installed. After years of cost reduction, the average US price per watt was between $2.51 to $3.31 in 2020 for 10 kW systems, and $1.05/W for utility systems.

Another type of distributed generation implemented by a utility company was the world's first grid-connected pole-attached solar panels of Public Service Enterprise Group in New Jersey. More than 174,000 PV panels are mounted on utility poles along streets of New Jersey with aggregated capacity of 40 MW.

As of November 2017, there were nearly 5,500 schools in the United States that had solar installations with the total capacity of approximately 910 MW. The top five states were Nevada, California, Hawaii, Arizona, and New Jersey with 23.10%, 14.50%, 14.50%, 14.10% and 13.00% of the schools in the respective states that had installations. As of April 2018, there were total capacity of 2,562 MW of commercial solar installations from more than 4,000 companies in 7,400 locations. Top five corporations were Target, Walmart, Prologis, Apple, and Kohl's.

In the United States 18% solar adopters in 2018 earned below the national median household income, while 30% were below the median for owner-occupied households. However, as prices have rapidly dropped over the last 10 years, and business models have evolved to avoid upfront costs or high credit scores, rooftop solar is trending towards reaching more and more families of all incomes.

For households that cannot access solar on their own roofs, community solar is an option. Community solar allows customers to sign up for access to a shared solar array and receive bill credits on their monthly utility bill. Community solar is available in about one third of the states, including MN, NJ, CA, NY, MA and CO.

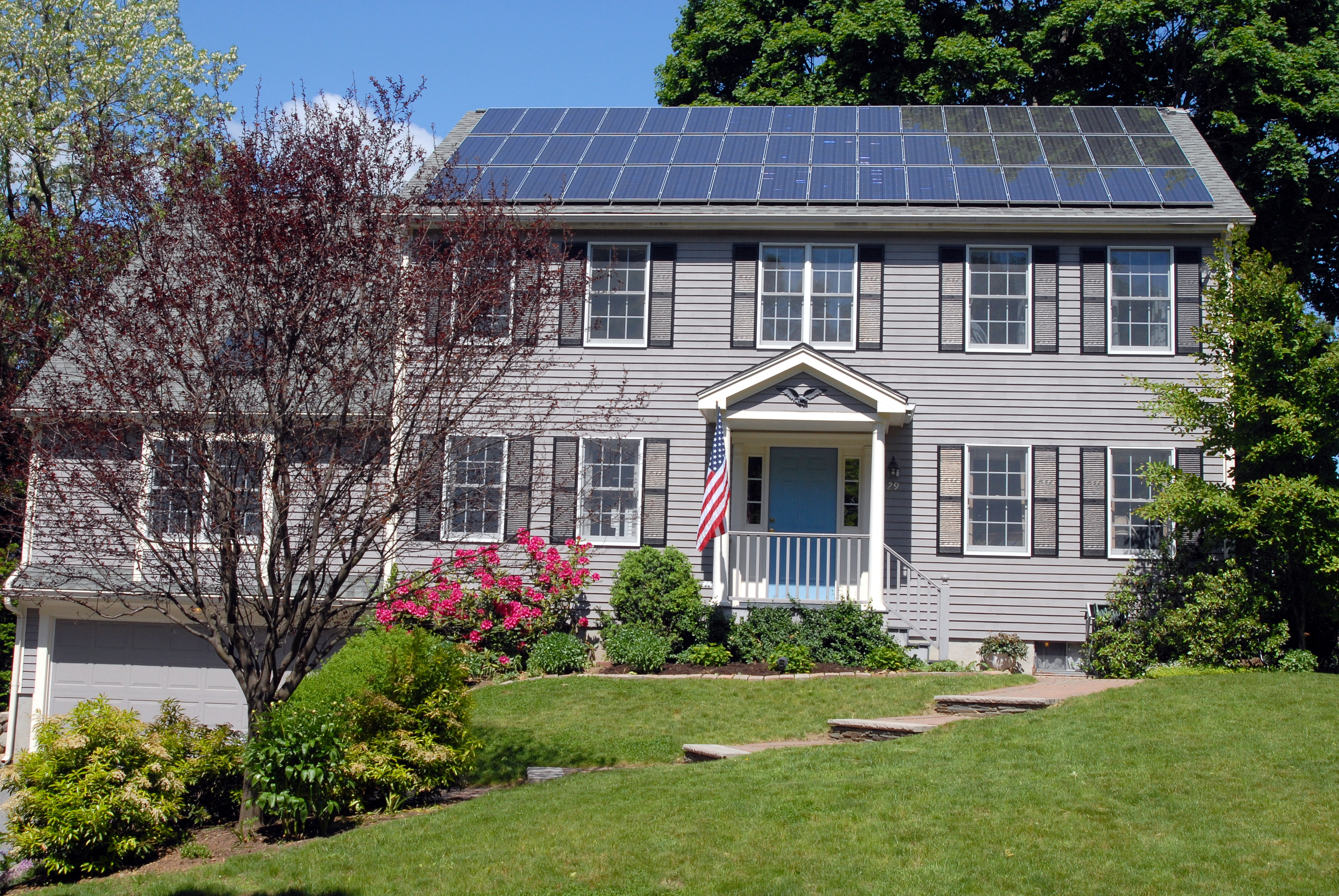
Photovoltaic panels on the roof of a house in Boston

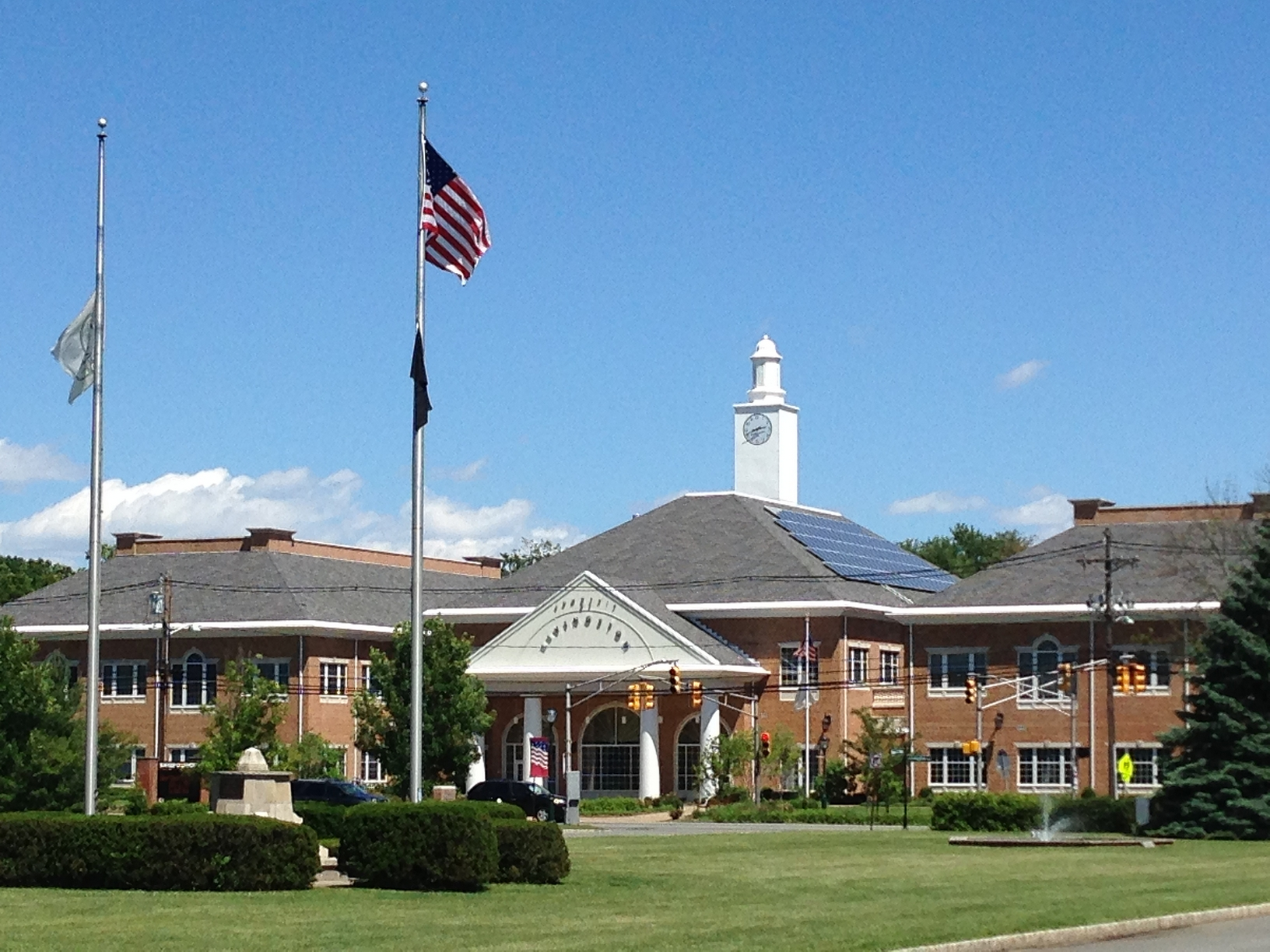
Photovoltaic panels on a town hall

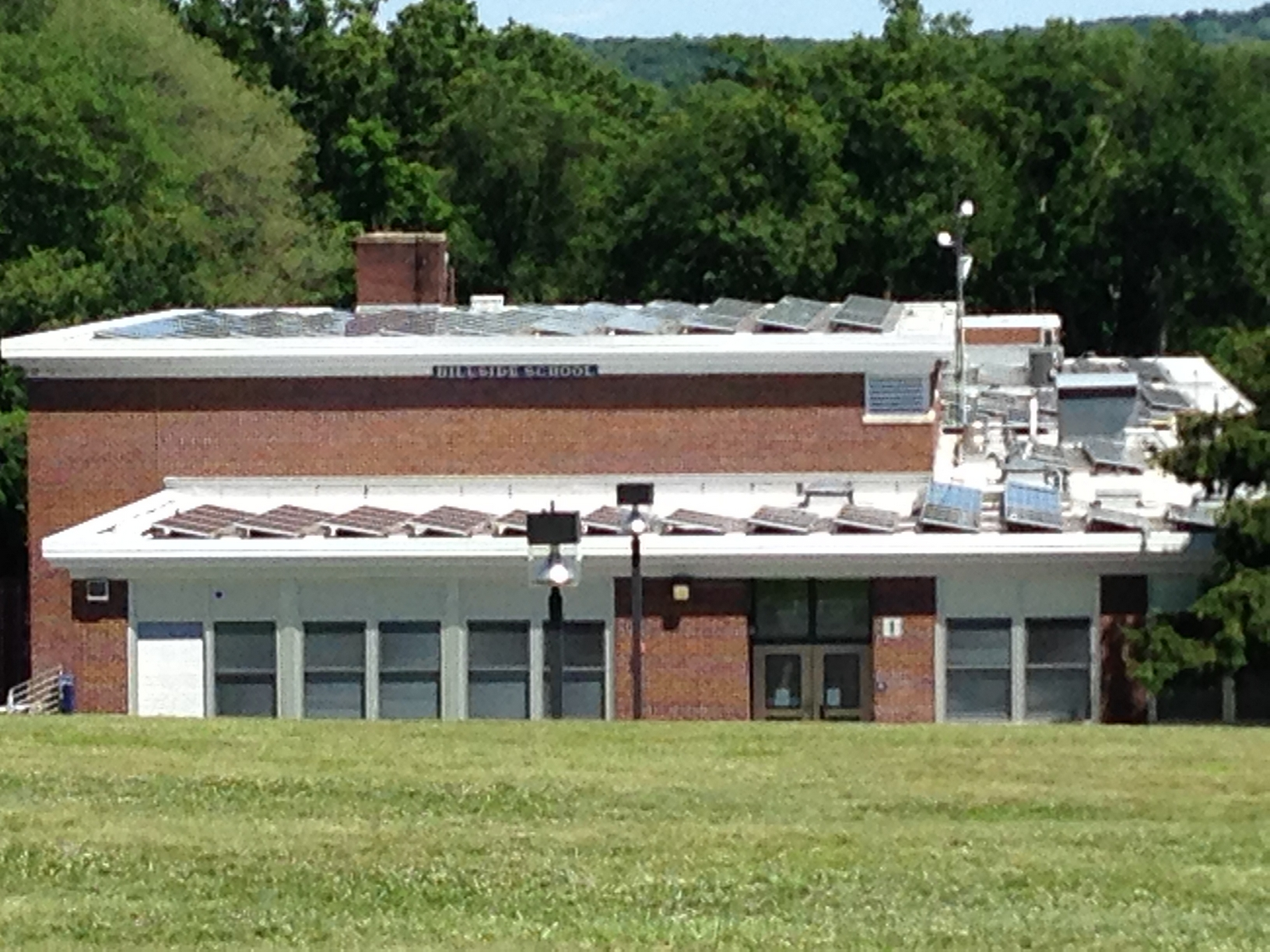
Photovoltaic panels on a school building

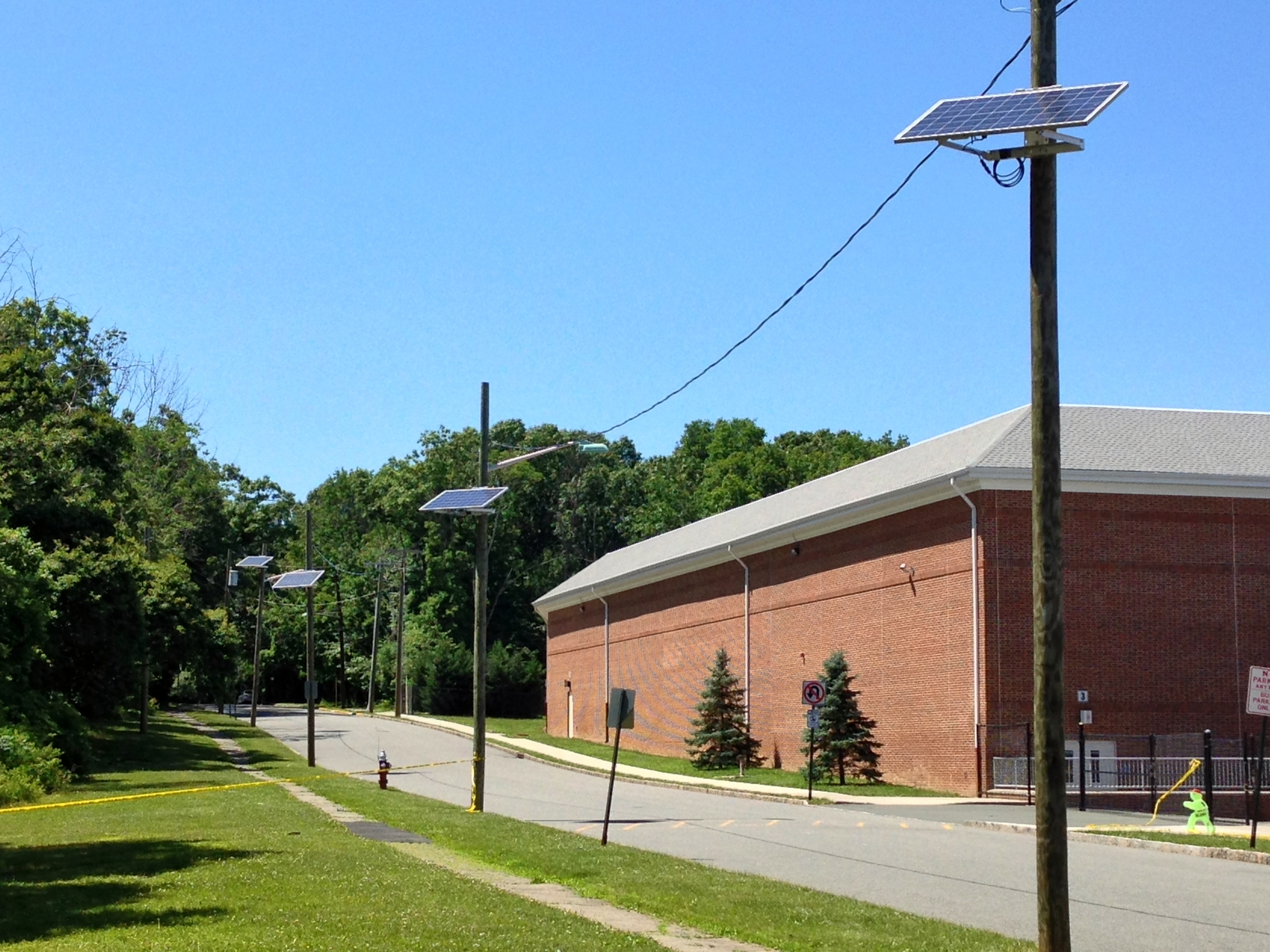
Pole-attached solar panels in New Jersey

=== Solar cell manufacturing ===
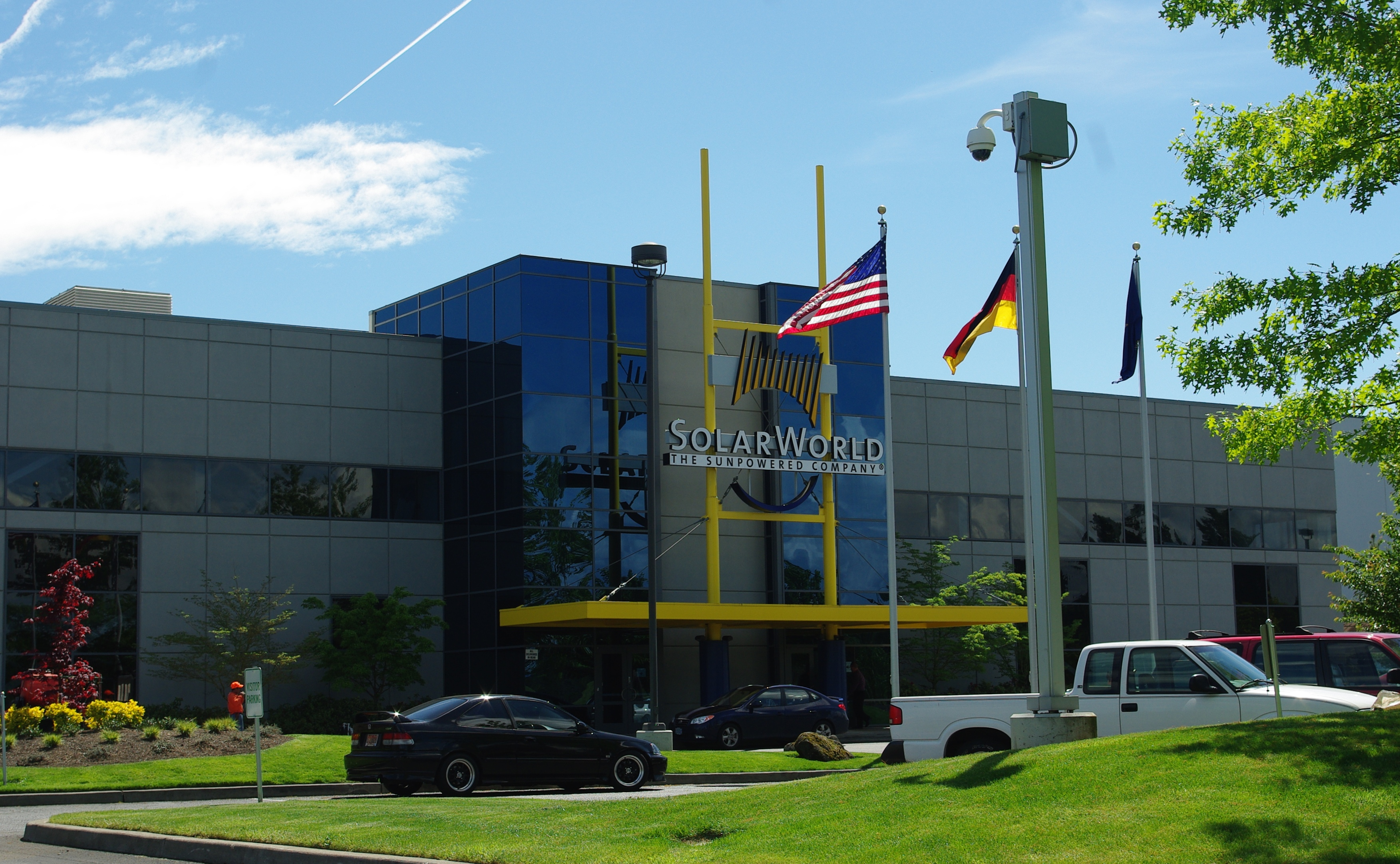
SolarWorld plant in Hillsboro, Oregon

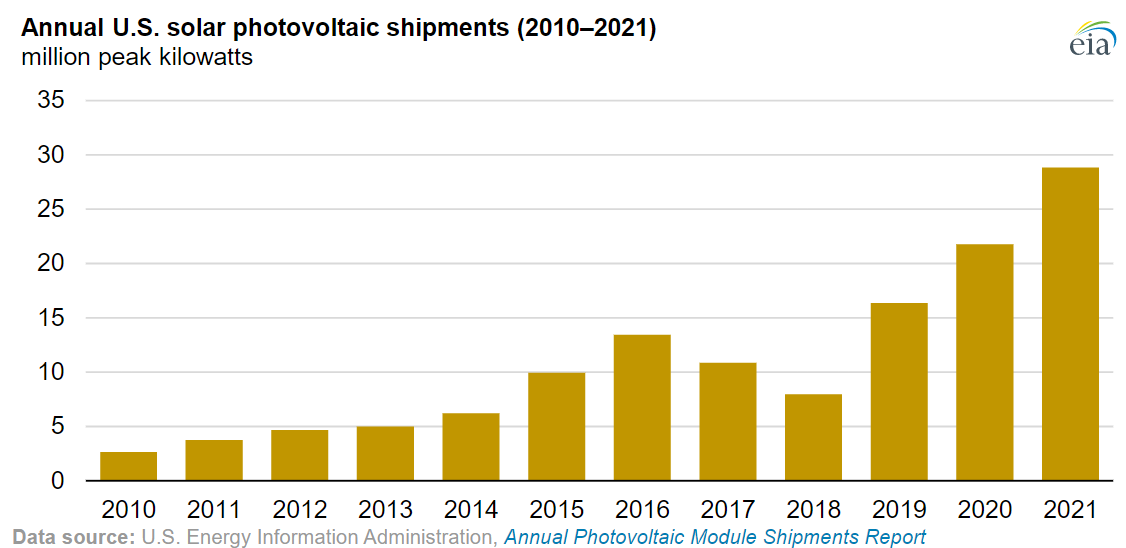
US solar photovoltaic shipments, 2010–2021

The American Recovery and Reinvestment Act of 2009 created a large investment into renewable energy with the purpose of developing an increase of green jobs. Thin-film photovoltaics (CdTe and CIGS) were chosen because they can be less expensive to manufacture than crystalline silicon-based solar cells.

In late September 2008, Sanyo Electric Company, Ltd. announced its decision to build a manufacturing plant for solar ingots and wafers (the building blocks for silicon solar cells) in Salem, Oregon. The plant was scheduled to begin operating in October 2009 and scheduled to reach its full production capacity of 70 megawatts (MW) of solar wafers per year by April 2010. In April 2013 the plant closed its wafer slicing operation. In February 2016 the parent company, Panasonic, announced it would lay off 37% of the remaining workforce.

In early October 2008, First Solar, Inc. broke ground on an expansion of its Perrysburg, Ohio, planned to add enough capacity to produce another 57 MW per year of solar modules at the facility, bringing its total capacity to roughly 192 MW per year. In November 2016 the company reduced the workforce in the Perrysburg plant by 20% as part of a worldwide restructuring. In mid-October 2008, SolarWorld AG opened a manufacturing plant in Hillsboro, Oregon. In 2016 the Hillsboro plant was the largest photovoltaic technology manufacturing plant in the Western Hemisphere. It maintains 500 megawatts of cell-manufacturing capacity and 350 MW of module-assembly capacity annually.

Rapidly decreasing photovoltaic prices put General Electric's planned factory in Colorado on hold, and led to the bankruptcy of Konarka Technologies, which had expected to produce 1,000 MW of solar modules per year by 2011, and Solyndra, which defaulted on a $535 million loan guarantee, prompting Republican members of the Energy and Commerce committee to vote to cease accepting new applications to the loan program.

In September 2014, SolarCity broke ground on a solar panel manufacturing plant in Buffalo, New York. Upon its completion in 2016, it was projected to be the largest solar manufacturing facility in the Western hemisphere, with an annual manufacturing capacity of 1 gigawatt. However, as of 2019 the facility has not met the projections on production or job creation.

=== Disposal ===
As cadmium, indium, selenium, nanoparticles, and other harmful elements are used in PV solar technology the disposal is similar to the outcomes of electronic waste. This can present possible risks for the workers disposing the product.

A 2021 study by Harvard Business Review indicates that, unless reused, by 2035 the discarded panels would outweigh new units by a factor of 2.56. They forecast the cost of recycling a single PV panel by then would reach $20–30, which would increase the LCOE of PV by a factor 4. Analyzing the US market, where no EU-like legislation exists as of 2021, HBR noted that without mandatory recycling legislation and with the cost of sending it to a landfill being just $1–2 there was a significant financial incentive to discard the decommissioned panels. The study assumed that consumers would replace panels halfway through a 30-year lifetime to make a profit. However prices of new panels increased in the year after the study. A 2022 study found that modules were lasting longer than previously estimated, and said that might result in less PV waste than had been thought. In 2023 the EPA considered regulations.

== Concentrated solar power (CSP) ==
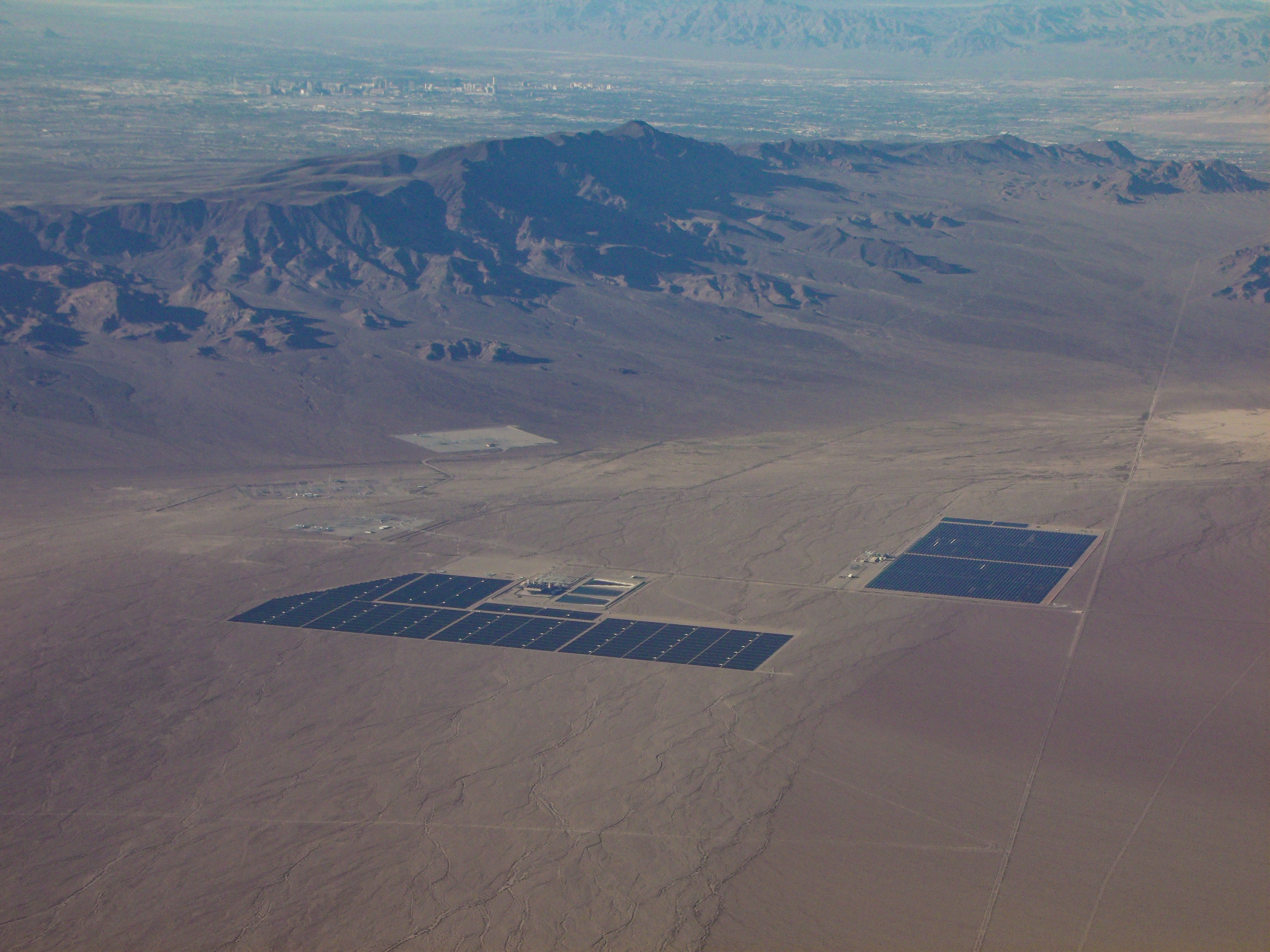
Nevada Solar One, with the Las Vegas Valley beyond the mountains behind it

=== History ===
One of the first applications of concentrated solar was the 6 horsepower (4.5 kW) solar powered motor made by H.E. Willsie and John Boyle in 1904.

An early solar pioneer of the 19th and 20th century, Frank Shuman, built a demonstration plant that used solar power to pump water using an array of mirrors in a trough to generate steam. Located in Philadelphia, the solar water pump station was capable of pumping 3,000 US gallons (11,000 L) an hour at that latitude, corresponding to 25 horsepower (19 kW). After seven weeks of testing the plant was disassembled and shipped to Egypt for testing as an irrigation plant.

In 1973, Karl Böer of the University of Delaware built an experimental house called the Solar One, the first house to convert sunlight into energy.

Solar One, the first pilot solar power tower design was completed in 1981. The parabolic trough Solar Energy Generating Systems opened its first unit in 1984, the first major solar thermal plant in the world.

=== Selected list of plants ===
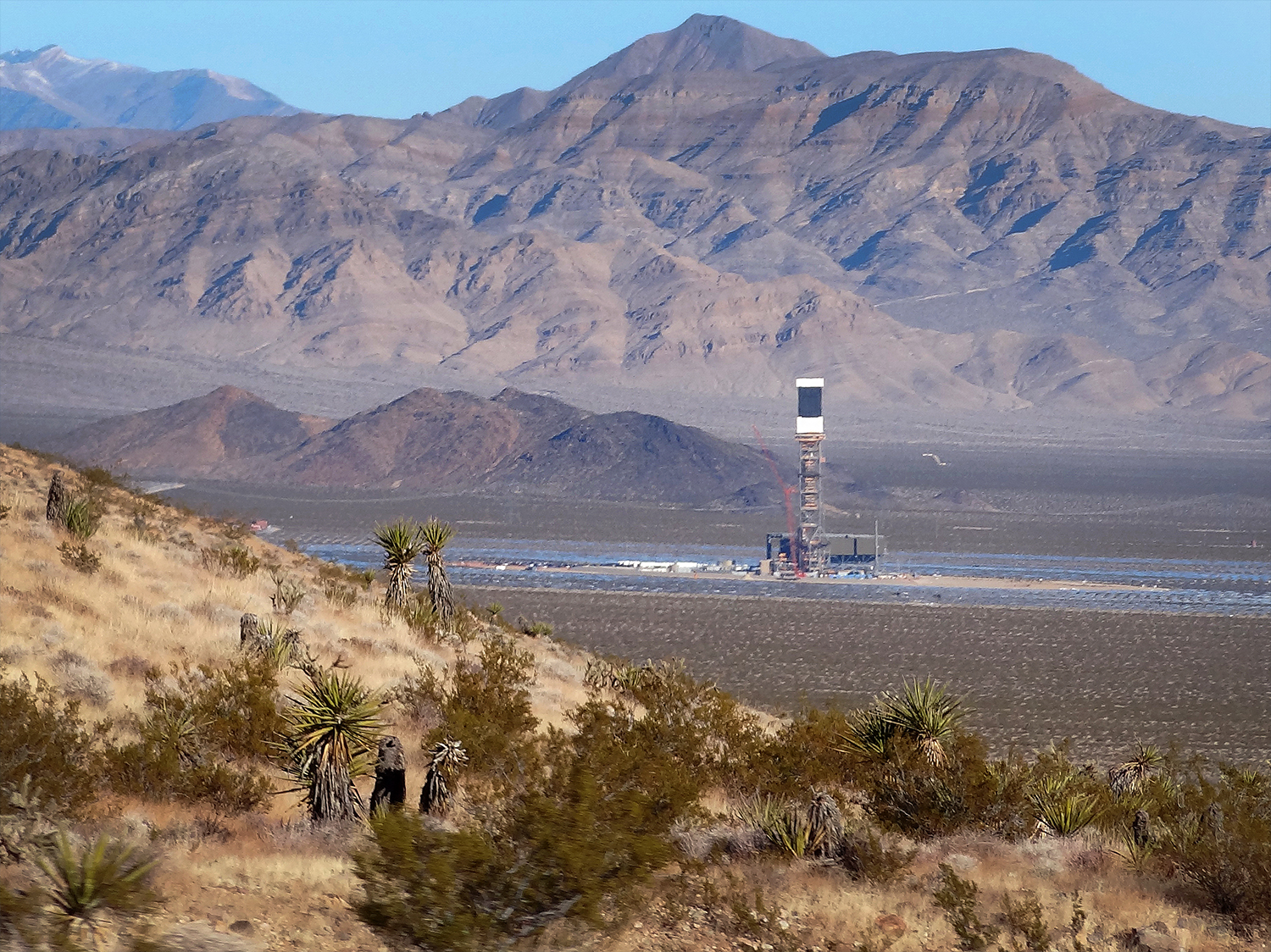
Looking north towards the Ivanpah Solar Power Facility's eastern boiler tower from Interstate 15 in California

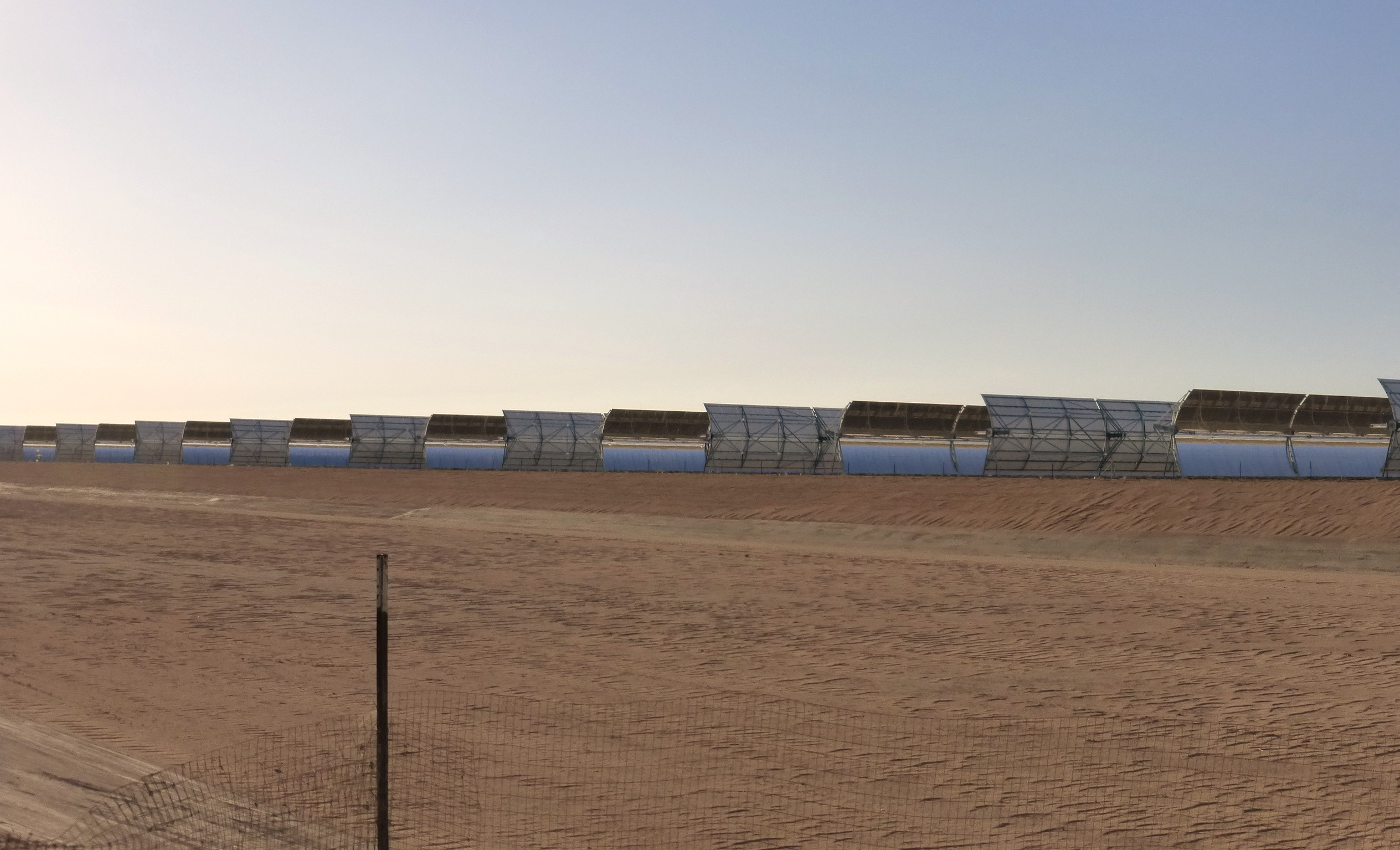
Mojave Solar Project near Harper Lake in California with parabolic troughs in their stow position

The United States pioneered solar tower and trough technologies. A number of different solar thermal technologies are in use in the U.S.:

- The largest solar thermal power plant in the world is the 392 MW Ivanpah Solar Power Facility, in California. It deploys 173,500 heliostats each with two mirrors focusing solar energy on boilers located on centralized solar power towers. The facility opened on February 13, 2014.
- The Solana Generating Station is a solar power plant near Gila Bend, Arizona, about 70 miles (110 km) southwest of Phoenix, completed in 2013. When commissioned it was the largest parabolic trough plant in the world and the first U.S. solar plant with molten salt thermal energy storage. Built by the Spanish company Abengoa Solar, it has a total capacity of 280 megawatts (MW), which is enough to power 70,000 homes while avoiding around 475,000 tons of carbon dioxide. Its name is the Spanish term for "sunny spot".
- The Martin Next Generation Solar Energy Center is a hybrid 75 megawatt (MW) parabolic trough solar energy plant that is owned by Florida Power & Light Company (FPL). The solar plant is a component of the 3,705 MW Martin County Power Plant. Completed at the end of 2010, it is located in western Martin County, Florida, just north of Indiantown.
- The Mojave Solar Project is a 280 MW solar thermal power facility in the Mojave Desert in California, which was completed in December 2014.
- The Crescent Dunes Solar Energy Project is a 110 MW solar thermal power project near Tonopah, about 230 miles (370 km) northwest of Las Vegas, which was completed in September 2015.

The rapidly falling price of PV solar had led to several projects being abandoned or converted to PV technology. Blythe Solar Power Project converted to a PV project, Rice Solar Energy Project was put on indefinite hold, Palen Solar Project tried to convert to PV, but its permits were denied. Hidden Hills Solar Project was suspended in 2013 and later canceled. No major CSP plants remain under construction in the United States.

Name	State	Location	Capacity (MW)	Annual generation (GWh)	Owner	Type	Notes
Solana	Arizona	32°55′N 112°58′W	280	792 (2019)	Arizona Solar	Solar Thermal (Parabolic Trough)	Largest solar thermal plant in the US and largest with molten salt energy storage

=== CSP capacity and generation ===
In 2013, Abengoa's 280 MWac of CSP project was brought online in the 3rd quarter. Genesis Solar's first phase of 125 MWac was brought online in the 4th quarter of 2013, bringing the total to 410 MWac for the year and 918 MWac total. Ivanpah was completed during the first quarter of 2014. The world's largest CSP power plant is 392 MWac, and brings the total to 1,310 MWac. The 110 MWac Crescent Dunes project started commissioning during February. The 250 MWac Mojave solar, second phase 125 MWac Genesis Solar, and Tooele Army Depot Solar's 1.5 MWac power plant are all expected to come online in 2014. A total of around 9.5 GW of solar PV and CSP capacity is expected to come online in 2016, more than any other source.

United States grid-connected CSP capacity by state (MW)
	United States	California	Arizona	Florida	Nevada	Colorado	New Mexico	Hawaii
1982	10	10	0	0	0	0	0	0
1983	10	10	0	0	0	0	0	0
1984	10	10	0	0	0	0	0	0
1985	24	24	0	0	0	0	0	0
1986	54	54	0	0	0	0	0	0
1987	114	114	0	0	0	0	0	0
1988	144	144	0	0	0	0	0	0
1989	204	204	0	0	0	0	0	0
1990	284	284	0	0	0	0	0	0
1991	364	364	0	0	0	0	0	0
1992	364	364	0	0	0	0	0	0
1993	364	364	0	0	0	0	0	0
1994	364	364	0	0	0	0	0	0
1995	364	364	0	0	0	0	0	0
1996	364	364	0	0	0	0	0	0
1997	364	364	0	0	0	0	0	0
1998	364	364	0	0	0	0	0	0
1999	354	354	0	0	0	0	0	0
2000	354	354	0	0	0	0	0	0
2001	354	354	0	0	0	0	0	0
2002	354	354	0	0	0	0	0	0
2003	354	354	0	0	0	0	0	0
2004	354	354	0	0	0	0	0	0
2005	354	354	1	0	0	0	0	0
2006	355	354	1	0	0	0	0	0
2007	419	354	1	0	64	0	0	0
2008	419	354	1	0	64	0	0	0
2009	430	364	1	0	64	0	0	0.8
2010	507	364	2.5	75	64	1	0	0.8
2011	516	364.5	4.8	75	64	2.4	6	0.8
2012	546	364.5	3.7	75	64	31.8	6	0.8
2013	918	489.5	283.7	75	64	31.8	6	0.8
2014	2,200	1256.5	283.7	75	64	31.8	6	0.8
2015	2,310	1256.5	283.7	75	184	31.8	6	0.8
2016	1,811		283.7	75	184			
2017	1,811		283.7	75	184			
2018	1,811		283.7	75	184			
2019	1,701		283.7	75	184			
2020	1,701							
2021	1,701							
2022	1,701							

- U.S. total numbers from 2016 onwards include utility-scale capacity only.

Solar thermal electricity generation in the United States
Year	Summer capacity (GW)	Electricity generation (GWh)	Capacity factor	Yearly growth of generating capacity	Yearly growth of produced energy	Portion of renewable electricity	Portion of total electricity
2004		569				0.16%	0.014%
2005		535			−6%	0.15%	0.013%
2006		493			−7.9%	0.13%	0.012%
2007	464.8	596			20.9%	0.17%	0.014%
2008	464.8	788		0%	32.2%	0.21%	0.019%
2009	473.0	735		1.7%	−6.7%	0.18%	0.019%
2010	473.0	789		0%	7.3%	0.18%	0.019%
2011	471.5	806		−0.2%	2.2%	0.16%	0.02%
2012	476.0	876	23.6%	0.8%	8.7%	0.18%	0.022%
2013	1,286.4	915	17.4%	170.2%	4.5%	0.18%	0.023%
2014	1,666.7	2,441	18.3%	29.6%	166.8%	0.45%	0.06%
2015	1,757.9	3,227	21.7%	5.5%	32.2%	0.59%	0.079%
2016	1,757.9	3,384	22.1%	3.6%	4.9%	0.56%	0.083%
2017	1,757.9	3,269	21.8%	0%	−3.4%	0.48%	0.081%
2018	1,757.9	3,592	23.6%	0%	9.9%	0.51%	0.086%
2019	1,758.1	3,218	21.2%	0%	−10.4%	0.44%	0.078%
2020	1,747.9	3,133	20.6%	−0.6%	−2.6%	0.4%	0.078%
2021	1,747.9	2,924	20.5%	0%	−6.7%	0.35%	0.071%

== Government support ==
A complete list of incentives is maintained at the Database of State Incentives for Renewable Energy (DSIRE). Most solar power systems are grid connected and use net metering laws to receive compensation for electricity that is not consumed on site and exported to the grid. New Jersey leads the nation with the least restrictive net metering law, and California leads in total number of homes which have solar panels installed. Many were installed because of the million solar roof initiative. In some states, such as Florida, solar power is subject to legal restrictions that discourage its use.

=== Federal ===
The federal tax credit for solar was extended for eight years as part of the financial bail out bill, H.R. 1424, until the end of 2016. It was estimated this would create 440,000 jobs, 28 gigawatts of solar power, and lead to a $300 billion market for solar panels. This estimate did not take into account the removal of the $2,000 cap on residential tax credits at the end of 2008. A 30% tax credit is available for residential and commercial installations. For 2009 through 2011 this was a 30% grant, not a tax credit, known as the 1603 grant program.

The federal Residential Energy Efficient Property Credit (income tax credit on IRS Form 5695) for residential PV and solar thermal was extended in December 2015 to remain at 30% of system cost (parts and installation) for systems put into service by the end of 2019, then 26% until the end of 2020, and 22% until the end of 2021. It applies to a taxpayer's principal and/or second residences, but not to a property that is rented out. There is no maximum cap on the credit, and the credit can be applied toward the Alternative Minimum Tax, and any excess credit (greater than that year's tax liability) could be rolled into the following year. The solar industry and utilities clashed extensively on renewal, but the solar industry prevailed. The renewal was expected to add $38 billion of investment for 20 GigaWatts of solar.

In 2022, the Inflation Reduction Act enhanced the investment tax credit available for solar; the base was set a 6% with a 5x multiplier if the project satisfied certain prevailing wage and apprenticeship requirements. Additional 10-20% bonuses were available depending on whether the project used domestic content in the facility, or located the project in a certain community. Additionally, the Inflation Reduction Act enabled solar projects to claim a production tax credit in lieu of the investment tax credit (similar to wind).

==== Section 1603 grants ====
President Obama's stimulus bill in 2009 created a program known as Section 1603 grants. The program was designed to give federal grants to solar companies for 30 percent of investments into solar energy. Since 2009, the federal government has given solar companies $25 billion in grant money through this program. The Section 1603 grant program expired in 2011.

On June 9, 2016, Senator Orrin Hatch requested from Department of Treasury, the Internal Revenue Service (IRS) and the Treasury Inspector General for Tax Administration (TIGTA) details about how companies use Section 1603 grants and tax credits. In March 2016, Hatch asked the IRS and Treasury Department to demonstrate that the agencies use safeguards and coordinate with each other when reviewing applications for Section 1603 grants.

==== Solar America Initiative ====
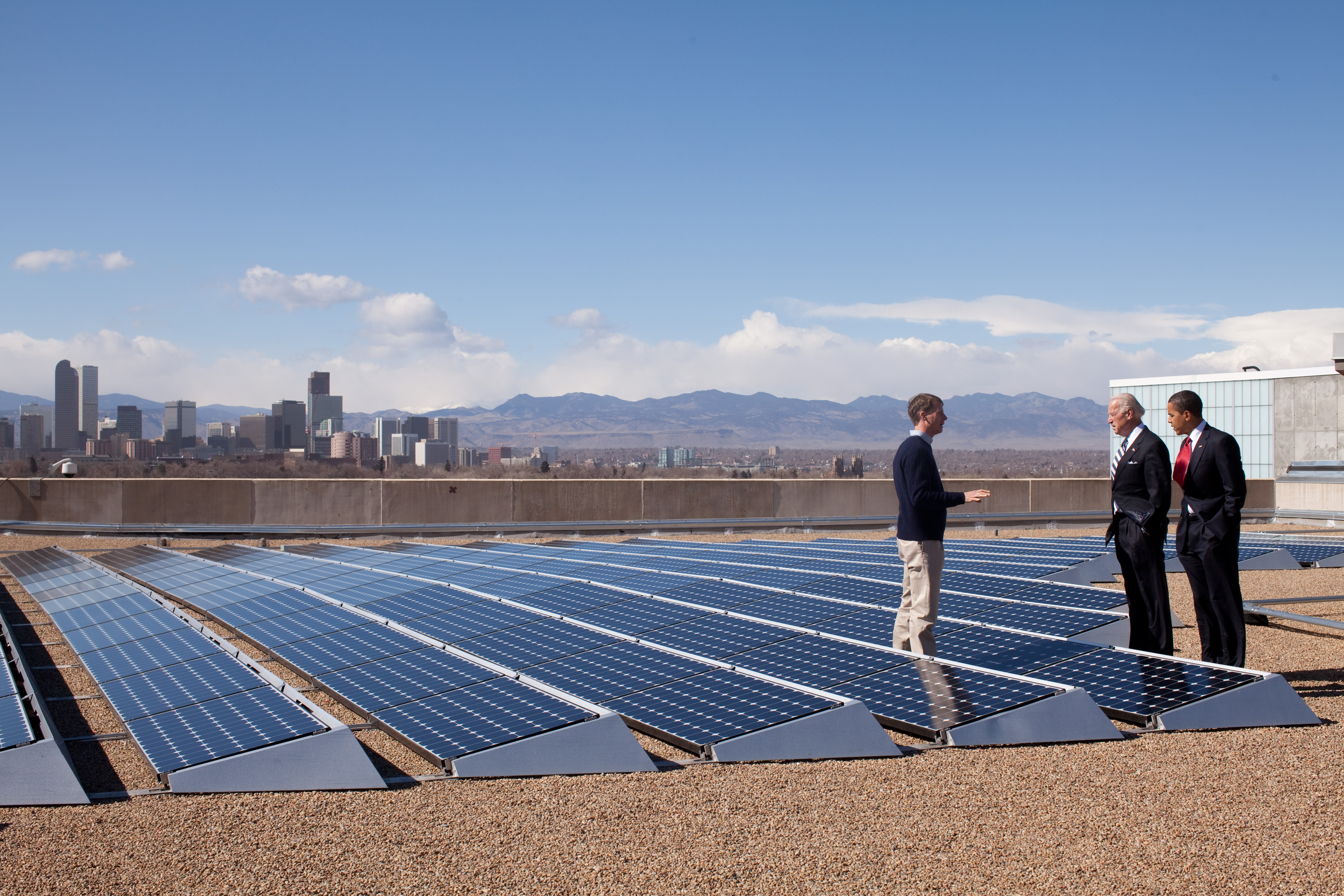
Barack Obama looking at solar panels at the Denver Museum of Nature and Science, Feb. 17, 2009

The United States Department of Energy (DOE) announced on September 29, 2008 that it would invest $17.6 million, subject to annual appropriations, in six company-led, early-stage photovoltaic (PV) projects under the Solar America Initiative's "PV Incubator" funding opportunity, designed to fund prototype PV components and systems with the goal of moving them through the commercialization process by 2010 and make it cost-competitive with conventional forms of electricity by 2015 (grid parity).

==== SunShot Initiative ====
The SunShot Initiative aimed to reduce the cost of solar power by 75% from 2010 to 2020. The name was based on "Moon shot", John F. Kennedy's 1961 target of reaching the Moon within the decade.

The programs goals include reducing residential, commercial, and utility-scale system prices.

==== First Trump administration ====
In 2018, as part of a trade war between the U.S. and China, US President Trump imposed tariffs on imported solar cells. The push for tariffs to protect American manufacturing and jobs in the solar power industry began in April 2017, when a bankrupt Georgia-based solar cell maker filed a trade complaint that a flood of cheap imports put them at a severe disadvantage. In response, the President imposed 30% tariffs of solar imports in January 2018. The solar industry was one of the fastest growing in the United States, employing more than 250,000 people as of 2018.

On one hand, these tariffs forced the cancellation or scaling down of many projects and restricted the ability of companies to recruit more workers. On the other hand, they had the intended effect of incentivizing domestic manufacturing. Many solar power companies increased automation, to become less dependent on imports, especially from China. Some analysts believed Trump's tariffs had a clear impact. Without them, the manufacturing capacity for solar cells in the United States would likely not have increased significantly, from 1.8 gigawatts in 2017 to at least 3.4 gigawatts in 2018, they argued. However, because of the increasing reliance on automation, not that many new jobs were created, while profits flowed to other countries, as many firms are foreign.

By 2019, the solar power industry had recovered from the initial setbacks due to Trump's tariffs, thanks to initiatives from various states, such as California. It received considerable support from the Department of Energy. The National Renewable Energy Laboratory (NREL) launched the "American-made Solar Prize" competition in June 2018 and handed out tens to hundreds of thousand of dollars in cash prizes for the most promising solar cell designs. Prices of solar cells continue to decline.

In the first half of 2025, solar and wind together accounted for 91% of all new U.S. power generating capacity, continuing solar’s dominance as the largest source of new electricity on the grid. Despite policy shifts, tariffs, and slowing growth in traditional solar strongholds, new solar buildouts are expanding rapidly in states beyond Texas and California.

==== Biden administration ====
In 2022, President Biden extended the decreased 15% tariff on solar panels another four years. The Inflation Reduction Act increased tax credits available to solar projects and provided funding to states and organizations for solar installations. The Inflation Reduction Act also included tax credits for the manufacture of components for solar facilities.

===== Second Trump administration =====
In 2025, the EPA began a years-long plan to deregulate many greenhouse gas emissions standards, reducing incentives for solar power. Proposals have included repealing Biden administration’s greenhouse gas emission standards for the power sector based on a new statutory interpretation and repealing the Biden administration’s 2024 Mercury and Air Toxic Standards (MATS) rule that regulated mercury emissions from coal-fired power plants and set filterable particulate matter emission standards, which required continuous emission monitoring systems to demonstrate compliance, and included first-time mercury emissions standards for lignite coal plants.

=== State and local ===
==== Solar power by state ====
- Alabama
- Alaska
- Arizona
- Arkansas
- California
- Colorado
- Connecticut
- Delaware
- Florida
- Georgia
- Hawaii
- Idaho
- Illinois
- Indiana
- Iowa
- Kansas
- Kentucky
- Louisiana
- Maine
- Maryland
- Massachusetts
- Michigan
- Minnesota
- Mississippi
- Missouri
- Montana
- Nebraska
- Nevada
- New Hampshire
- New Jersey
- New Mexico
- New York
- North Carolina
- North Dakota
- Ohio
- Oklahoma
- Oregon
- Pennsylvania
- Rhode Island
- South Carolina
- South Dakota
- Tennessee
- Texas
- Utah
- Vermont
- Virginia
- Washington
- Washington, D.C.
- West Virginia
- Wisconsin
- Wyoming

==== State initiatives ====
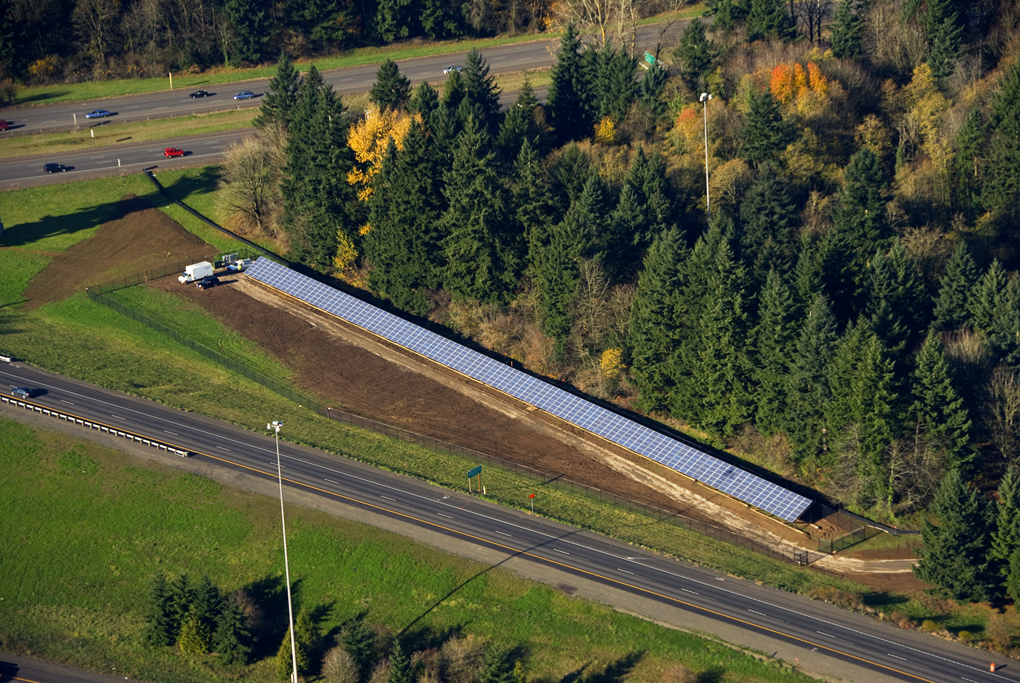
The 104kW solar highway along the interchange of Interstate 5 and Interstate 205 near Tualatin, Oregon in December 2008

- Governor Jerry Brown signed legislation requiring California's utilities to get 50 percent of their electricity from renewable energy sources by the end of 2030.
- The San Francisco Board of Supervisors passed solar incentives of up to $6,000 for homeowners and up to $10,000 for businesses. Applications for the program began on July 1, 2008. in April 2016, they passed a law requiring all new buildings under 10 stories to have rooftop solar panels, making it the first major U.S. city to do so
- In 2008, Berkeley initiated a revolutionary pilot program for homeowners to add the cost of solar panels to their property tax assessment, and pay for them out of their electricity cost savings. In 2009, more than a dozen states passed legislation allowing property tax financing. In all, 27 states then offered loans for solar projects (though after the conclusion of the pilot program, due to issues with Fannie Mae and Freddie Mac, Berkeley no longer offers this financing mechanism).
- The California Solar Initiative set a goal to create 3,000 megawatts of new, solar-produced electricity by 2016.
- New Hampshire had a $3,750 residential rebate program for up to 50% of system cost for systems less than 5 kWp ($6,000 from July 1, 2008 until 2010).
- Louisiana had a 50 percent tax credit up to $12,500 for the installation of a wind or solar system.
- New Jersey law provides new solar power installations with Solar Renewable Energy Certificates and exemptions from the 7% state sales tax and any increase in property assessment (local property tax increases), subject to certain registration requirements.
- Massachusetts has multiple incentives to encourage solar power. New MA residential solar arrays are eligible for a 15% State tax credit up to $1000, a solar Sales Tax exemption, and a solar Property Tax exemption. The Solar Massachusetts Renewable Target (SMART) Plan was also available to solar installations until 2022 based on the customer's utility.

===== Solar power in Puerto Rico =====
Since the devastating Hurricane Maria in 2017, the adoption of solar energy with battery storage in Puerto Rico has grown rapidly. The self-governing Caribbean archipelago and island is an American unincorporated territory with an estimated population of 3,205,691. As of June 2024, approximately 95,000 households have installed grid-tied solar energy systems with battery storage. This represents about 80% of the total distributed solar installations on the island. Since September 2017, more than 107,000 customers have installed these systems, with the vast majority including battery backup. According to a June 2024 report by the Institute for Energy Economics and Financial Analysis (IEEFA), the archipelago was installing about 4,000 new solar systems per month. Rooftop solar accounts for 7% of total electricity consumption in Puerto Rico as of June 2024. Puerto Rico's chronically unstable electrical grid has driven a remarkable surge in distributed solar installations, with nearly 10% of households now equipped with grid-tied solar systems that provide critical backup during frequent outages. This trend is expected to continue, supported by federal funding programs, including a $500 million effort by the Energy Department to install systems for vulnerable households.

In late 2023, Puerto Rico launched its virtual power plant (VPP). Virtual power plants (VPPs) usually combine a significant number of distributed energy resources (DER). As of November 2024, 7,000 homes had enrolled.

In early 2024, a conflict arose in Puerto Rico over a law supporting solar energy. Act 10, passed in 2023 and signed in January 2024, extended net metering for new home solar systems until 2031. Net metering allows solar panel owners to sell excess electricity back to the grid, making solar more affordable. However, the Financial Oversight and Management Board (FOMB), a federal entity overseeing Puerto Rico's finances, opposed this law. They sent letters threatening to overturn Act 10, claiming it conflicted with their fiscal plans. Twenty-one Members of Congress, including Puerto Rico's representative and prominent politicians like Alexandria Ocasio-Cortez and Bernie Sanders, wrote a letter supporting net metering. Fifteen environmental and community organizations asked President Joe Biden to appoint new FOMB members who would protect solar energy in Puerto Rico. According to the 2024 report, despite widespread agreement among policymakers, experts, and institutions that renewable energy sources are crucial for Puerto Rico's power grid "those in charge of day-to-day operation are pursuing aggressive plans for natural gas expansion."

Under the Biden administration, the DOE's Loan Programs Office lent over $1bn towards the development of utility scale solar facilities on the island.

==== Feed-in tariffs ====
Experience has demonstrated that a feed-in tariff is both the least expensive and the most effective means of developing solar power. Investors need certainty, which they receive from a feed-in tariff. California enacted a feed-in tariff which began on February 14, 2008. Washington state has a feed-in tariff of 15 ¢/kWh which increases to 54 ¢/kWh if components are manufactured in the state. Hawaii, Michigan, and Vermont also have feed in tariffs. In 2010, the Federal Energy Regulatory Commission (FERC) ruled that states were able to implement above-market feed-in tariffs for specific technologies.

In 2012 the U.S. Department of Commerce placed a 31% tariff on solar cells made in China. In 2018, the Trump administration placed a 30% tariff on all imported solar equipment.

==== Solar renewable energy certificates ====
In recent years, states that have passed Renewable Portfolio Standard (RPS) or Renewable Electricity Standard (RES) laws have relied on the use of solar renewable energy certificates (SRECs) to meet state requirements. This is done by adding a specific solar carve-out to the state Renewable Portfolio Standard (RPS). The first SREC program was implemented in 2005 by the state of New Jersey and has since expanded to several other states, including Maryland, Delaware, Ohio, Massachusetts, North Carolina and Pennsylvania.

An SREC program is an alternative to the feed-in tariff model popular in Europe. The key difference between the two models is the market-based mechanism that drives the value of the SRECs, and therefore the value of the subsidy for solar. In a feed-in tariff model, the government sets the value for the electricity produced by a solar facility. If the level is higher, more solar power is built and the program is more costly. If the feed-in tariff is set lower, less solar power is built and the program is ineffective. The problem with SRECs is a lack of certainty for investors. A feed-in tariff provides a known return on investment, while an SREC program provides a possible return on investment.

==== Power purchase agreements ====
In 2006 investors began offering free solar panel installation in return for a 25-year contract, or power purchase agreement, to purchase electricity at a fixed price, normally set at or below existing electric rates. By 2009 over 90% of commercial photovoltaics installed in the United States were installed using a power purchase agreement. Approximately 90% of the photovoltaics installed in the United States is in states that specifically address power purchase agreements.

==== New construction mandates ====
In March 2013, Lancaster, California became the first U.S. city to mandate the inclusion of solar panels on new homes, requiring that "every new housing development must average 1 kilowatt per house."

== Generation (PV and CSP) ==
Utility-scale solar generation in the United States (GWh)
Year	NREL total	EIA util total	EIA util % of total	Jan	Feb	Mar	Apr	May	Jun	Jul	Aug	Sep	Oct	Nov	Dec
1996		521	0.02%												
1997		511	0.01%												
1998		502	0.01%												
1999		495	0.01%												
2000	804	493	0.01%												
2001	822	543	0.01%	7	13	31	39	81	91	92	85	65	21	14	4
2002	857	555	0.01%	11	24	44	46	58	96	86	75	53	31	28	4
2003	929	534	0.01%	13	18	50	60	68	91	62	62	56	36	14	4
2004	1,020	575	0.01%	13	11	53	57	82	88	82	73	61	34	15	8
2005	1,145	550	0.01%	8	13	37	57	81	87	71	75	60	37	12	2
2006	1,312	508	0.01%	13	20	33	52	71	70	62	83	54	32	16	3
2007	1,718	612	0.01%	13	19	48	54	84	84	86	75	68	48	23	3
2008	2,208	864	0.02%	16	36	75	94	99	128	111	105	93	60	29	19
2009	2,922	891	0.02%	7	30	78	99	110	103	121	116	95	68	40	21
2010	4,505	1,212	0.03%	10	33	76	112	153	176	161	156	138	75	77	44
2011	7,454	1,818	0.04%	40	85	122	164	191	223	191	229	186	159	107	121
2012	12,692	4,327	0.11%	95	135	231	319	462	527	509	462	458	431	347	349
2013	21,074	9,036	0.22%	310	433	619	667	753	871	829	944	949	988	824	850
2014	32,553	17,691	0.43%	751	835	1,317	1,487	1,750	1,923	1,788	1,879	1,832	1,717	1,380	1,032
2015	44,296	24,893	0.61%	1,155	1,484	2,072	2,379	2,504	2,558	2,627	2,788	2,217	1,910	1,730	1,570
2016	52,833	36,054	0.88%	1,486	2,242	2,617	2,880	3,425	3,473	3,945	3,969	3,635	3,191	2,767	2,424
2017	77,097	53,287	1.32%	2,324	2,751	4,514	4,907	5,785	6,115	5,569	5,369	5,059	4,650	3,209	3,035
2018	96,147	63,825	1.53%	3,319	3,896	5,056	6,057	6,849	7,415	6,755	6,695	5,961	4,970	3,743	3,110
2019	107,275	71,937	1.74%	3,580	3,836	5,899	6,752	7,162	7,971	8,133	7,877	6,817	6,093	4,364	3,453
2020	132,631	89,199	2.23%	4,459	5,561	6,350	7,921	9,653	9,654	10,610	9,315	7,732	7,085	5,767	5,091
2021	164,422	115,258	2.8%	5,559	6,330	9,296	10,892	12,457	12,197	12,192	11,967	11,214	9,268	7,795	6,091
2022	205,074	143,792	3.4%	7,822	9,027	11,694	13,402	15,120	16,052	15,765	14,502	13,286	11,942	8,403	6,777
2023	238,937	165,530	3.96%	7,806	9,435	12,213	15,062	17,281	17,834	18,894	17,744	15,583	14,121	10,446	9,113
2024	303,752	219,834	5.1%	9,583	12,540	16,019	19,241	22,371	24,459	24,484	24,328	20,538	19,828	13,841	12,601
2025	393,343	300,303	6,79%	15,710	16,670	23,725	27,225	30,261	32,585	34,081	32,466	28,592	25,101	18,587	15,299
2026	329,119	255,354	8,31%	18,399	21,686	29,524	30,987	36,369	38,527	41,044	38,819				
Last entry, % of total				4.5%	6.21%	8.32%	9.41%	10.27%	9,74%	9,13%	8,64%	7,76%	7,33%	5,6%	4.03%

Source: NREL, EIA; NREL includes distributed generation, EIA, including the monthly data above, includes only utility-scale generation. "EIA util % of total" is the percentage of all electricity produced at utility-scale facilities that is generated by utility-scale solar.

== See also ==
- American Solar Energy Society
- Floating solar
- List of photovoltaics companies
- Solar cell research
- Solar landfill — solar installation on filled landfills or brownfields

US renewables:

- Renewable energy in the United States
- Biofuel in the United States
- Geothermal energy in the United States
- Hydroelectric power in the United States
- List of renewable energy companies in the United States
- Wind power in the United States

General:

- Electricity sector of the United States
- Energy in the United States

International:

- List of renewable energy topics by country and territory
