= Renewable Energy Wildlife Institute =

The Renewable Energy Wildlife Institute (REWI), formerly called the American Wind and Wildlife Institute (AWWI) until 2022, is a U.S. nonprofit organization that seeks to encourage the development of wind energy and solar power while preserving wildlife and habitats that are at risk from the operation and development of wind farms. Located in Washington, D.C., REWI was founded in November 2008 by a coalition of seven conservation and science organizations – including the Environmental Defense Fund, The Nature Conservancy and the Union of Concerned Scientists – and 13 wind industry companies. REWI's initiatives have included the development of wind siting maps and identifying potential biodiversity concerns created by wind energy projects.
