= Solar power in South Carolina =

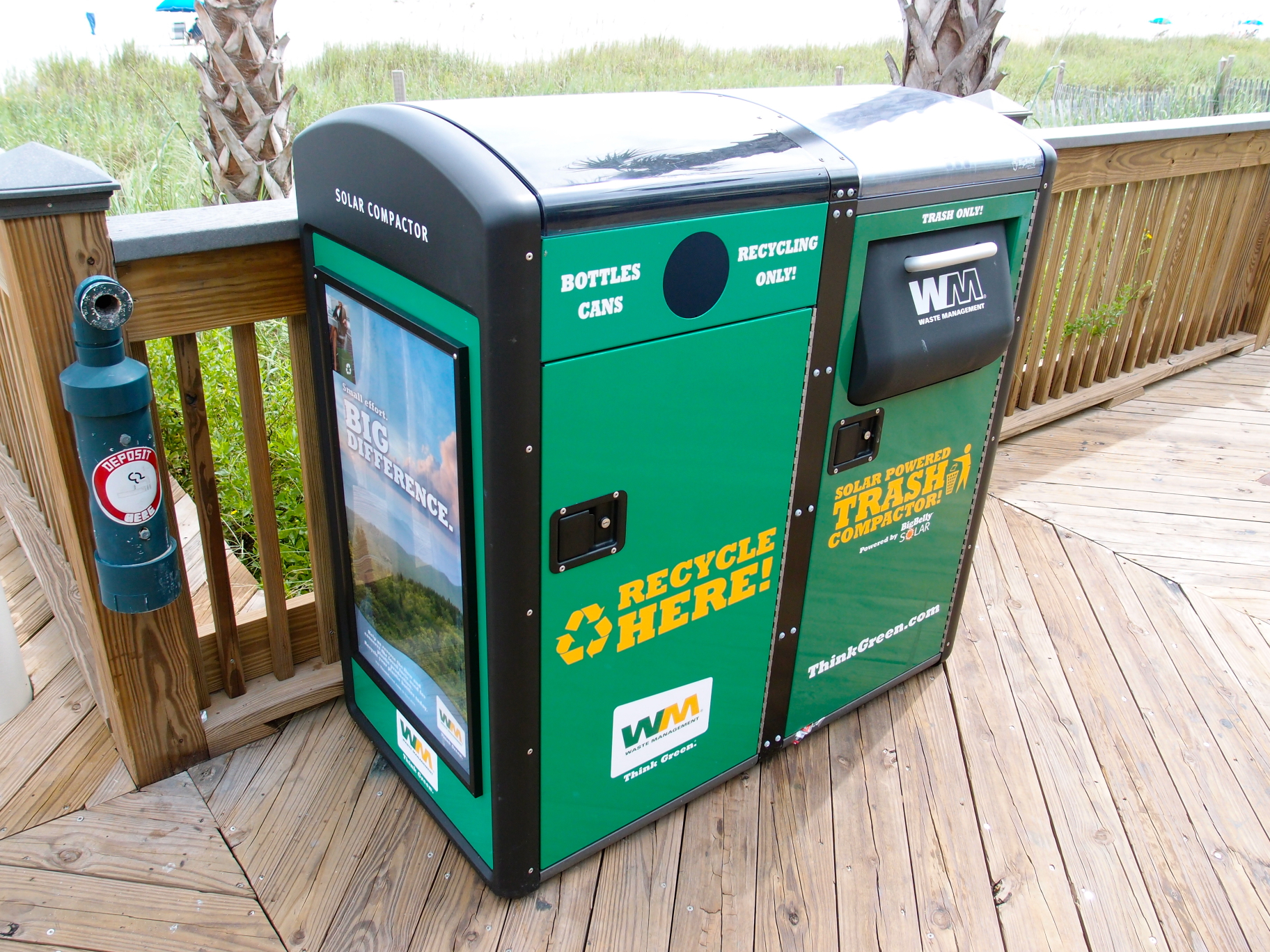
Solar-powered recycle cans, Myrtle Beach

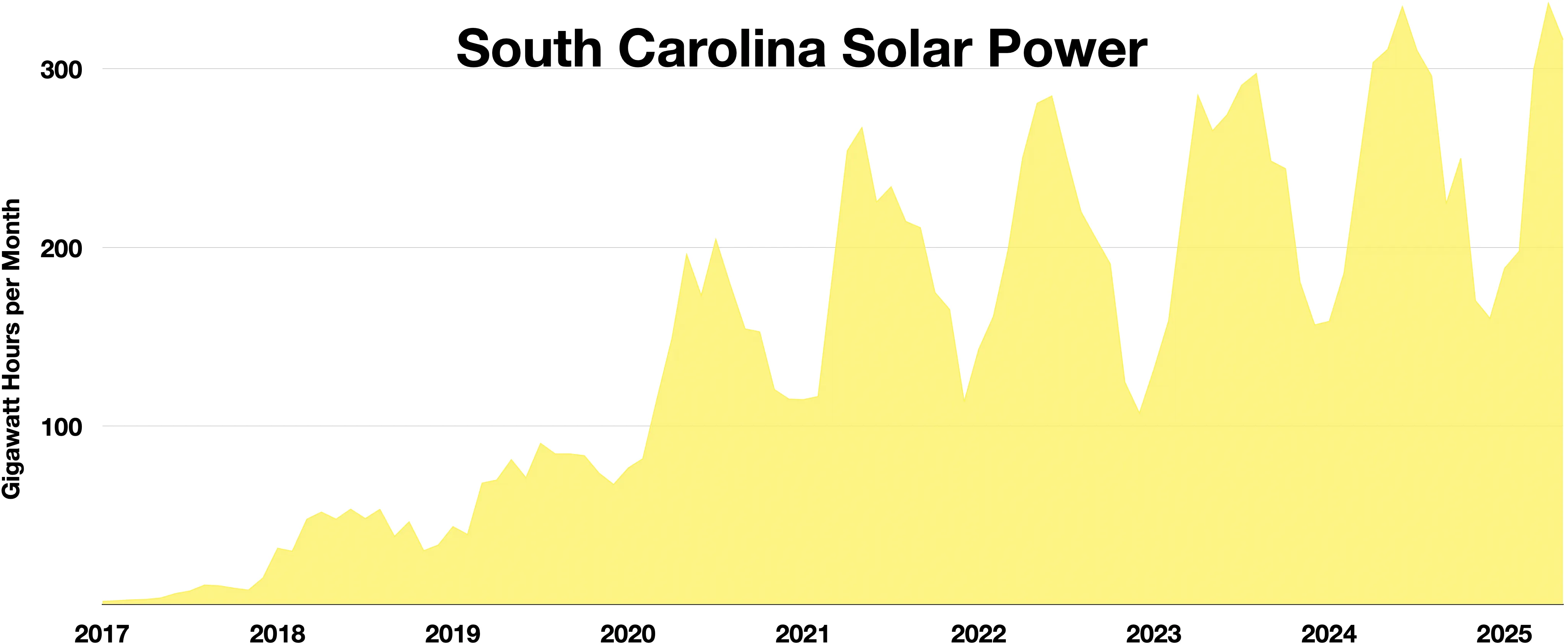
South Carolina solar power

Solar power in South Carolina is rapidly becoming competitive with grid electricity, due to the decrease in cost and the eight-year extension to the 30% federal tax credit, which can be used to install any size system. South Carolina offers a 25% tax credit, meaning that 55% of the cost is covered through tax credits.

South Carolina's largest solar installation was the 311 kW Grand Strand Solar Station array in Myrtle Beach, completed on April 18, 2011, until December 2, 2011, when Boeing completed covering the roof of their 787 assembly building with a 2.6 MW solar array, sufficient for 20% of the building's energy use.

== Currently operating (Note: As of December 31, 2025) ==
=== Lowcountry Region ===
Solar Facilities in South Carolina (Lowcountry Region)
#	Plant Name	Utility Name	County	Capacity (MW)	Operating Year
1	Azalea Solar, LLC	Azalea Solar, LLC	Dorchester	85.0	2023
2	Caney Branch Solar	Caney Branch Solar, LLC	Orangeburg	75.0	2024
3	Charleston Solar	Altus Power America Management, LLC	Charleston	5.0	2018
4	Coastal Solar	Altus Power America Management, LLC	Georgetown	5.0	2018
5	Colleton Solar Farm	TIG Sun Energy I LLC	Colleton	2.5	2013
6	Cooper River Solar	LS Power Development, LLC	Berkeley	10.0	2020
7	Denmark Solar	SunStrong Management	Bamberg	4.9	2018
8	Dorchester Solar	Altus Power America Management, LLC	Dorchester	5.0	2018
9	Georgetown Solar	Altus Power America Management, LLC	Georgetown	5.0	2018
10	Goose Creek Solar	Altus Power America Management, LLC	Berkeley	5.0	2018
11	Hampton Solar, LLC	SunStrong Management	Hampton	4.9	2021
12	Hanahan Solar	Altus Power America Management, LLC	Berkeley	5.0	2018
13	Hardeeville Solar Project	Dominion Renewable Energy	Jasper	10.0	2017
14	Harleyville Solar	Altus Power America Management, LLC	Dorchester	5.0	2018
15	Hilton Head Solar	Altus Power America Management, LLC	Beaufort	5.0	2018
16	Isle of Palms Solar	Altus Power America Management, LLC	Charleston	5.0	2018
17	Ladson Solar	Altus Power America Management, LLC	Charleston	5.0	2018
18	Lowcountry Solar	Altus Power America Management, LLC	Beaufort	5.0	2018
19	Moffett Solar Project	Dominion Renewable Energy	Jasper	71.4	2017
20	Moncks Corner Solar	Altus Power America Management, LLC	Berkeley	5.0	2018
21	Mount Pleasant Solar	Altus Power America Management, LLC	Charleston	5.0	2018
22	North Charleston Solar	Altus Power America Management, LLC	Charleston	5.0	2018
23	Ridgeland Solar Project	Dominion Renewable Energy	Jasper	10.0	2017
24	St. Stephen Solar	Altus Power America Management, LLC	Berkeley	5.0	2018
25	Summerville Solar	Altus Power America Management, LLC	Dorchester	5.0	2018
26	Walterboro Solar	Altus Power America Management, LLC	Colleton	5.0	2018

=== Midlands Region ===
Solar Facilities in South Carolina (Midlands Region)
#	Plant Name	Utility Name	County	Capacity (MW)	Operating Year
1	Allora Solar, LLC	Allora Solar, LLC	Lexington	75.0	2023
2	Augusta Solar	Augusta Solar, LLC	Aiken	5.0	2024
3	Batesburg Solar	SunStrong Management	Saluda	3.8	2021
4	Beech Island Solar	Cypress Creek Renewables	Aiken	71.4	2018
5	Blackstock Solar, LLC	SunStrong Management	Chester	5.0	2022
6	Blythewood Solar	Altus Power America Management, LLC	Richland	5.0	2019
7	Calhoun Solar Project	Dominion Renewable Energy	Calhoun	71.4	2018
8	Camden Solar	SunStrong Management	Kershaw	4.9	2018
9	Camden Solar Project	Dominion Renewable Energy	Kershaw	71.4	2017
10	Capital City Solar	Altus Power America Management, LLC	Richland	5.0	2018
11	Chapin Solar	Altus Power America Management, LLC	Lexington	5.0	2018
12	Chester Solar Project	Dominion Renewable Energy	Chester	71.4	2018
13	Columbia Solar	Altus Power America Management, LLC	Richland	5.0	2018
14	Eastover Solar	Altus Power America Management, LLC	Richland	5.0	2018
15	Edgefield Solar	SunStrong Management	Edgefield	5.0	2021
16	Fairfield Solar Project	Dominion Renewable Energy	Fairfield	71.4	2018
17	Great Falls Solar	Altus Power America Management, LLC	Chester	2.0	2019
18	Holly Hill Solar	Altus Power America Management, LLC	Orangeburg	5.0	2018
19	Irmo Solar	Altus Power America Management, LLC	Lexington	5.0	2018
20	Johnston Solar	SunStrong Management	Edgefield	5.0	2017
21	Kershaw Solar	Altus Power America Management, LLC	Kershaw	5.0	2018
22	Lancaster Solar	Altus Power America Management, LLC	Lancaster	5.0	2018
23	Lexington Solar	Altus Power America Management, LLC	Lexington	5.0	2018
24	Lugoff Solar	Altus Power America Management, LLC	Kershaw	5.0	2018
25	New Ellenton Solar	Altus Power America Management, LLC	Aiken	5.0	2018
26	Orangeburg Solar	Altus Power America Management, LLC	Orangeburg	5.0	2018
27	Saluda Solar II	SunStrong Management	Saluda	3.4	2017
28	Saluda Solar, LLC	Cypress Creek Renewables	Saluda	6.8	2016
29	St. Matthews Solar	SunStrong Management	Calhoun	10.2	2017
30	Sumter Solar	Altus Power America Management, LLC	Sumter	5.0	2018
31	Union Solar	Altus Power America Management, LLC	Union	2.0	2019
32	West Columbia Solar	Altus Power America Management, LLC	Lexington	5.0	2018

=== Pee Dee Region ===
Solar Facilities in South Carolina (Pee Dee Region)
#	Plant Name	Utility Name	County	Capacity (MW)	Operating Year
1	1634 Solar	1634 Solar, LLC	Darlington	2.0	2021
2	Abbot Solar	Altus Power America Management, LLC	Clarendon	2.0	2018
3	Ashley Solar (SC)	Ashley Solar (SC)	Darlington	2.0	2025
4	Barnwell Solar, LLC	SunStrong Management	Barnwell	5.0	2021
5	Baywood Solar	SunStrong Management	Horry	5.0	2020
6	Bennettsville Solar	SunStrong Management	Marlboro	5.0	2018
7	Darlington Solar, LLC	SunStrong Management	Darlington	10.0	2016
8	Dillon Solar Project	Duke Energy Progress - (NC)	Dillon	5.0	2017
9	Florence Solar	Altus Power America Management, LLC	Florence	5.0	2018
10	Greeleyville Solar	Altus Power America Management, LLC	Williamsburg	2.0	2019
11	Hartsville Solar	Altus Power America Management, LLC	Darlington	5.0	2018
12	Kingstree Solar	Altus Power America Management, LLC	Williamsburg	2.0	2019
13	Lake City Solar	Altus Power America Management, LLC	Florence	5.0	2018
14	Latta Solar	Altus Power America Management, LLC	Dillon	2.0	2019
15	Little River Solar	Altus Power America Management, LLC	Horry	5.0	2018
16	Loris Solar	Altus Power America Management, LLC	Horry	5.0	2018
17	Manning Solar	Altus Power America Management, LLC	Clarendon	2.0	2019
18	Marion Solar	Altus Power America Management, LLC	Marion	2.0	2019
19	Mullins Solar	Altus Power America Management, LLC	Marion	2.0	2019
20	Shorthorn Holdings	SolRiver Capital LLC	Marlboro	8.9	2023
21	Surfside Beach Solar	Altus Power America Management, LLC	Horry	5.0	2018
22	Whitetail Solar	SolRiver Capital LLC	Dillon	10.0	2021

=== Upstate Region ===
Solar Facilities in South Carolina (Upstate Region)
#	Plant Name	Utility Name	County	Capacity (MW)	Operating Year
1	AGA TAG Solar III LLC	AGA TAG Solar III LLC	Spartanburg	2.0	2020
2	ATOOD Solar III LLC	ATOOD Solar III LLC	Spartanburg	2.0	2019
3	Ace Solar	Altus Power America Management, LLC	Anderson	1.0	2020
4	Adams	Adams Solar SC, LLC	Anderson	2.1	2021
5	Anderson (SC)	Anderson Solar Farm, LLC	Anderson	2.0	2021
6	Atood II	Cypress Creek Renewables	Spartanburg	2.0	2018
7	BMW Manufacturing Co	BMW Manufacturing Co LLC	Spartanburg	0.1	2012
8	Broad River Solar	Broad River Solar, LLC	Cherokee	100.0	2021
9	Camp Branch	Altus Power America Management, LLC	Anderson	2.0	2019
10	Campobello Solar	Cypress Creek Renewables	Spartanburg	6.8	2016
11	Central Solar	Altus Power America Management, LLC	Pickens	2.0	2019
12	Cherokee Solar	Altus Power America Management, LLC	Cherokee	2.0	2019
13	Chesnee Solar	SunStrong Management	Spartanburg	4.0	2017
14	Clemson Solar	Altus Power America Management, LLC	Pickens	2.0	2019
15	Clinton Solar	Altus Power America Management, LLC	Laurens	2.0	2019
16	Clover Solar	Altus Power America Management, LLC	York	2.0	2019
17	Conestee Solar	Altus Power America Management, LLC	Greenville	2.0	2019
18	Cowpens Solar	Altus Power America Management, LLC	Spartanburg	2.0	2019
19	Donalds Solar	Altus Power America Management, LLC	Abbeville	2.0	2019
20	Duncan Solar	Altus Power America Management, LLC	Spartanburg	2.0	2019
21	Easley Solar	Altus Power America Management, LLC	Pickens	2.0	2019
22	Enoree Solar	Altus Power America Management, LLC	Spartanburg	2.0	2019
23	Epworth Solar	SunStrong Management	Greenwood	5.0	2021
24	Fountain Inn Solar	Altus Power America Management, LLC	Greenville	2.0	2019
25	Gaffney Solar	Altus Power America Management, LLC	Cherokee	2.0	2019
26	Gray Court Solar	Altus Power America Management, LLC	Laurens	2.0	2019
27	Greer Solar	Altus Power America Management, LLC	Greenville	2.0	2019
28	Hodges Solar	Altus Power America Management, LLC	Greenwood	2.0	2019
29	Honea Path Solar	Altus Power America Management, LLC	Anderson	2.0	2019
30	Inman Solar	Altus Power America Management, LLC	Spartanburg	2.0	2019
31	Laurens Solar	Altus Power America Management, LLC	Laurens	2.0	2019
32	Liberty Solar	Altus Power America Management, LLC	Pickens	2.0	2019
33	Lyman Solar	Altus Power America Management, LLC	Spartanburg	2.0	2019
34	Mauldin Solar	Altus Power America Management, LLC	Greenville	2.0	2019
35	Newberry Solar	Altus Power America Management, LLC	Newberry	2.0	2019
36	Ninety Six Solar	Altus Power America Management, LLC	Greenwood	2.0	2019
37	Pacolet Solar	Altus Power America Management, LLC	Spartanburg	2.0	2019
38	Pendleton Solar	Altus Power America Management, LLC	Anderson	2.0	2019
39	Pickens Solar	Altus Power America Management, LLC	Pickens	2.0	2019
40	Piedmont Solar	Altus Power America Management, LLC	Anderson	2.0	2019
41	Prosperity Solar	Altus Power America Management, LLC	Newberry	2.0	2019
42	Taylors Solar	Altus Power America Management, LLC	Greenville	2.0	2019
43	Travelers Rest Solar	Altus Power America Management, LLC	Greenville	2.0	2019
44	Wellford Solar	Altus Power America Management, LLC	Spartanburg	2.0	2019
45	Woodruff Solar	Altus Power America Management, LLC	Spartanburg	2.0	2019
46	Catawba Solar	SunStrong Management	York	5.0	2021

== Data Sets ==
Source: NREL

Installed photovoltaics
Year	Total (MW)	Installed (MW)
2009	0.6	
2010	0.9	0.3
2011	4.1	3.2
2012	4.6	0.5
2013	8.0	3.5
2014	12	4
2015	15	3
2016	115	100
2017	405	390
2018	555	150
2019	1,158.7	603.7
2020	1,781.6	622.9
2021	1,923.8	142.2
2022	2,314	390.2

== See also ==
- Solar power in the United States
- Renewable energy in the United States
