= Solar power in Mississippi =

Overview of solar power in the U.S. state of Mississippi

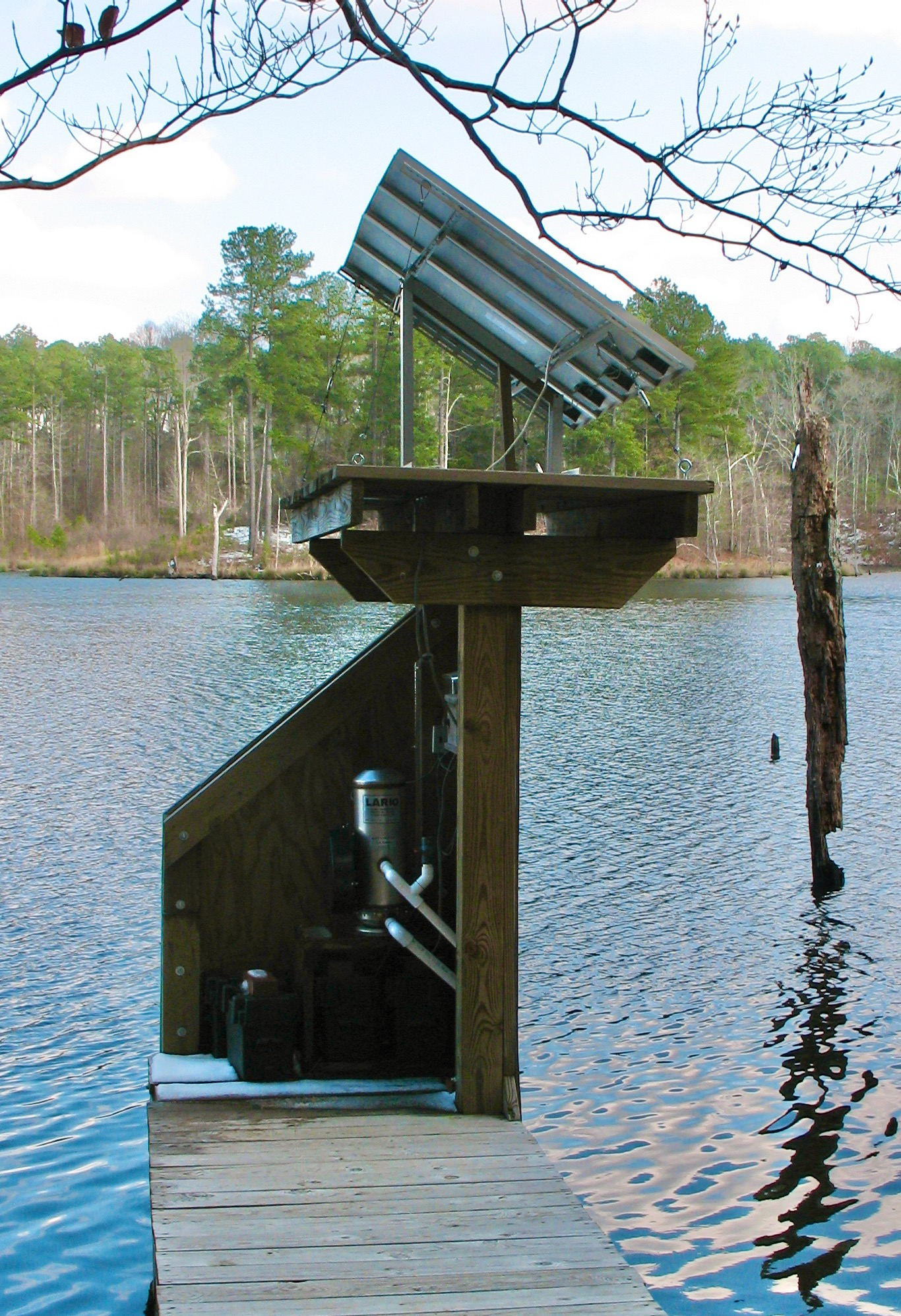
Solar-powered pump, Oxford

Mississippi has substantial potential for solar power, though it remains an underutilized generation method. The rate of installations has increased in recent years, reaching 438 MW of installed capacity in early 2023, ranking 36th among the states. Rooftop photovoltaics could provide 31.2% of all electricity used in Mississippi from 11,700 MW if solar panels were installed on every available roof.

In 2011, the Sierra Club sued the United States Department of Energy which was providing investment in a coal gasification plant being built by Mississippi Power. In 2012, Mississippi Power had only 0.05% renewables in its power mix. In a settlement in 2014, Mississippi Power agreed to allow net metering, and to offer 100 MW of wind or solar power purchase agreements. Mississippi is one of only two states, along with Florida, to have no potential for standard commercial wind power, having no locations that would provide at least 30% capacity factor, although 30,000 MW of 100 meter high turbines would operate at 25% capacity factor.

Mississippi Power, which provides energy in southeast Mississippi, has started a program to contract for 210 MW of solar power in 2014, possibly increasing to 525 MW. 100 MW would be from small scale distributed installations.

Offering net metering is required by federal law, but Mississippi is one of only four states to not have adopted a statewide policy on net metering, which means it needs to be negotiated with the utility.

== Statistics ==
Source: NREL

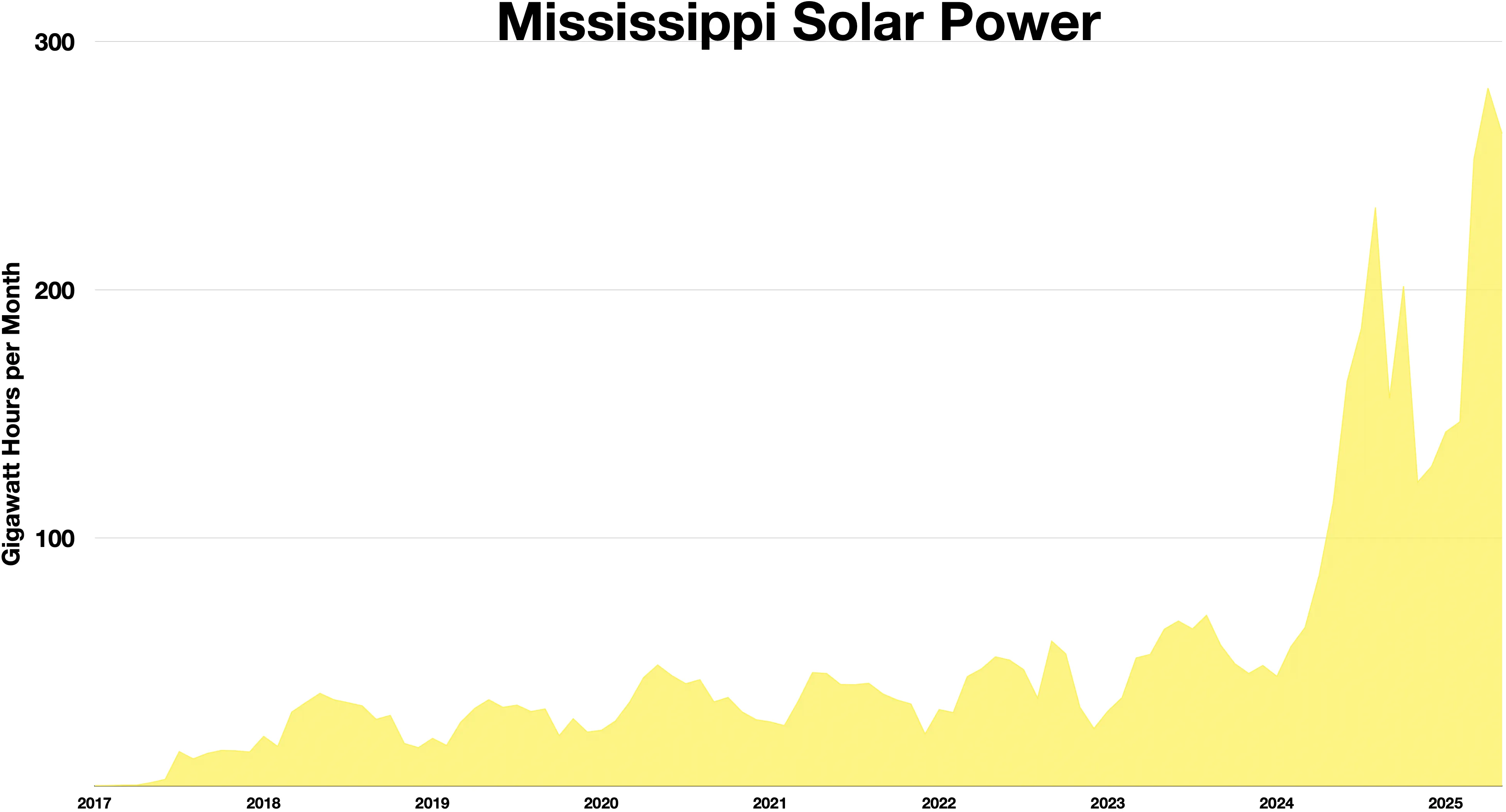
Mississippi solar power

Grid-connected PV capacity (MW)
Year	Capacity	Change	% Change
2009	0.1		
2010	0.3	0.1	200%
2011	0.6	0.3	100%
2012	0.7	0.1	17%
2013	1.0	0.3	43%
2014	1.0	0	0%
2015	1.1	0.1	10%
2016	6	0.9	545%
2017	72	66	1200%
2018	187	115	260%
2019	242.3	55.3	29%
2020	318.4	76.1	31%
2021	319.6	1.2	%
2022	437	117.4	%

Utility-scale solar generation in Mississippi (GWh)
Year	Total	Jan	Feb	Mar	Apr	May	Jun	Jul	Aug	Sep	Oct	Nov	Dec
2017	84	0	0	0	0	1	3	14	11	13	14	14	14
2018	326	20	16	30	34	37	35	34	32	27	28	17	16
2019	322	19	16	26	31	35	32	33	30	31	20	27	22
2020	434	23	27	34	44	49	45	42	43	34	36	30	27
2021	303	26	25	35	46	46	42	41	42				

== Installations ==
- Four megawatts at Naval Construction Battalion Center in Gulfport by Hannah Solar, Mississippi Power's developer

== See also ==
- Renewable energy in the United States
- Solar power in the United States
