= Solar power in Delaware =

Part of Delaware electric system

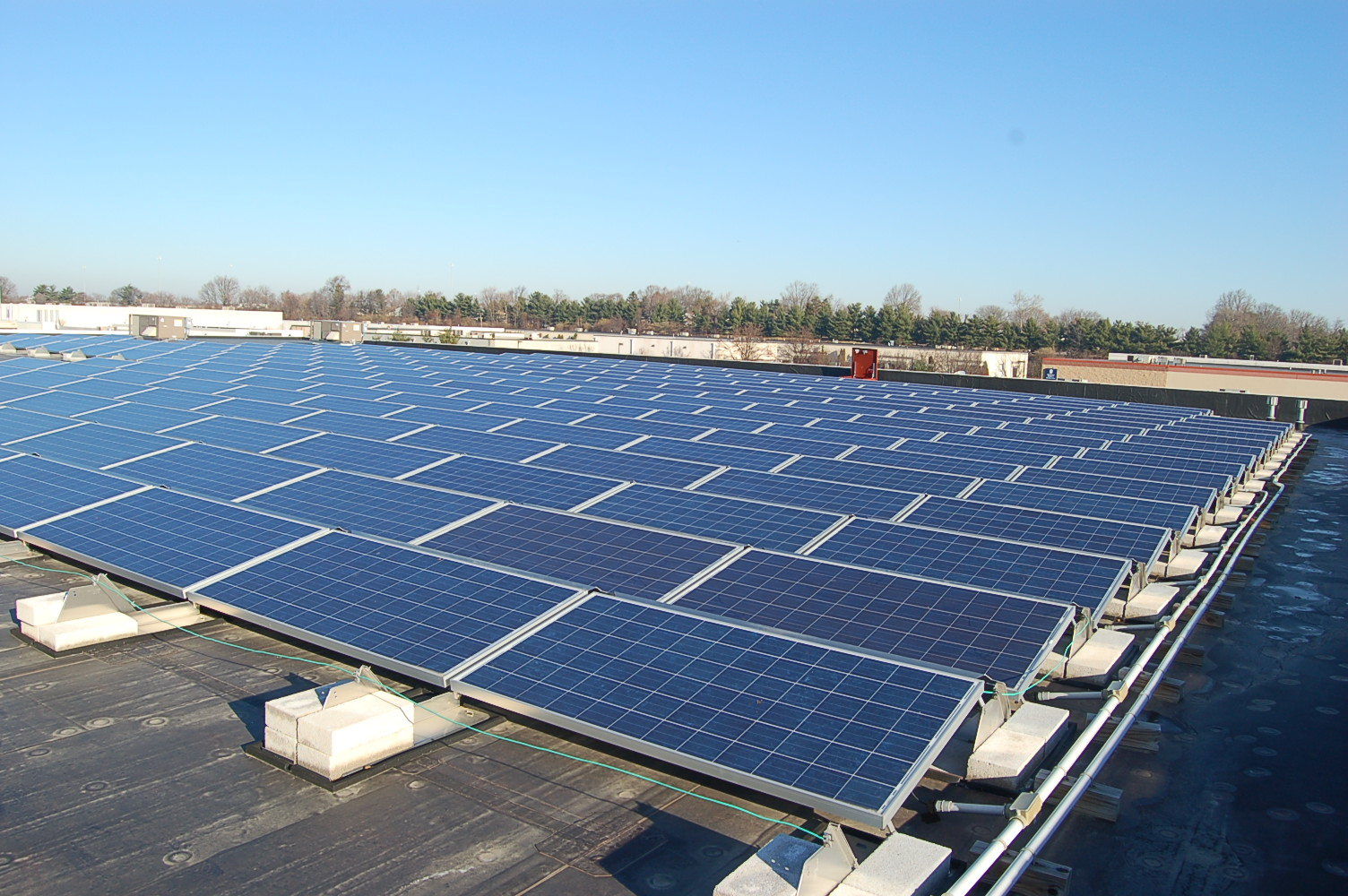
Solar installation, New Castle

Solar power in Delaware is a small industry. Delaware had 150 MW of total installed capacity in 2020. The largest solar farms in the state included the 10 MW Dover Sun Park and the 12 MW Milford Solar Farm.

The expansion of Bruce A. Henry Solar Farm near Georgetown in Sussex County from 23 to 40 acres was completed in 2020.

A 2012 study found that a typical 5 kW system would pay for itself in five years, and go on to provide a savings of $37,837 over the balance of its 25-year life. It is estimated that 19% of all electricity use in Delaware can be provided by rooftop solar panels. The state's renewable portfolio standard required 0.4% from solar in 2012, 0.6% in 2013, 3.5% from solar by 2025, and 25% from renewable sources.

Net metering is available for residential customers up to 25 kW, and others from 100 kW to 2 MW, depending on type of customer and the utility. Excess generation is credited at retail rate to next month's bill and optionally paid once a year at energy supply rate (normally referred to as "avoided cost").

== Currently operating (Note: As of December 31, 2025) ==
Solar Facilities in Delaware
| # | Plant Name | Utility Name | County | Capacity (MW) | Operating Year |
|---|---|---|---|---|---|
| 1 | AstraZeneca Newark Solar | AstraZeneca Pharmaceuticals | New Castle | 3.2 | 2024 |
| 2 | Blue Hen Solar | Madison Energy Holdings LLC | Kent | 1.5 | 2022 |
| 3 | Bruce A Henry Solar Farm | Delaware Electric Cooperative | Sussex | 4.0 | 2013 |
| 4 | Chaberton Solar Blackburn | Pivot Energy | Kent | 3.0 | 2025 |
| 5 | DD Hay Road Solar 23 LLC | Laurel Capital Partners | New Castle | 1.2 | 2015 |
| 6 | DE-ECA CS Hartly | Hartly Community Energy Initiative LLC | Kent | 4.0 | 2025 |
| 7 | DE-ECA CS Seaford | Glenville Hollow Community Energy Initiative LLC | Sussex | 3.0 | 2025 |
| 8 | DEC Phase II at Georgetown | Luminace Solar MC, LLC | Sussex | 3.0 | 2019 |
| 9 | DG AMP Solar Smyrna | DG AMP Solar, LLC | Kent | 1.2 | 2018 |
| 10 | Dover Sun Park | White Oak Solar Energy LLC | Kent | 10.0 | 2011 |
| 11 | ENGIE Solidago Solar Project - Hybrid | ENGIE Solidago Solar LLC | New Castle | 50.0 | 2022 |
| 12 | Heimlich Solar | Heimlich Solar Partners LLC | Sussex | 4.5 | 2024 |
| 13 | KE73 CSG | Nautilus Solar Solutions | Kent | 4.0 | 2025 |
| 14 | Kent County Wastewater Treatment Solar | Kent County Levy Court Dept of Pub Work | Kent | 1.2 | 2011 |
| 15 | Milford Solar Farm | Milford Solar LLC | Kent | 11.8 | 2012 |
| 16 | Onyx - Allen Harim | Onyx Asset Services Group | Sussex | 1.2 | 2017 |
| 17 | Perdue Bridgeville Photovoltaic | Terraform Arcadia | Sussex | 1.3 | 2011 |
| 18 | South Campus Solar | JPMorgan Chase Bank | New Castle | 0.5 | 2011 |
| 19 | South Campus Solar | JPMorgan Chase Bank | New Castle | 1.3 | 2021 |
| 20 | Sussex CSG 2 LLC | Dimension Energy LLC | Sussex | 3.3 | 2025 |
| 21 | WHA Southbridge Solar Park CSG | Ecogy Delaware II LLC. | New Castle | 1.4 | 2018 |

== Installed capacity ==
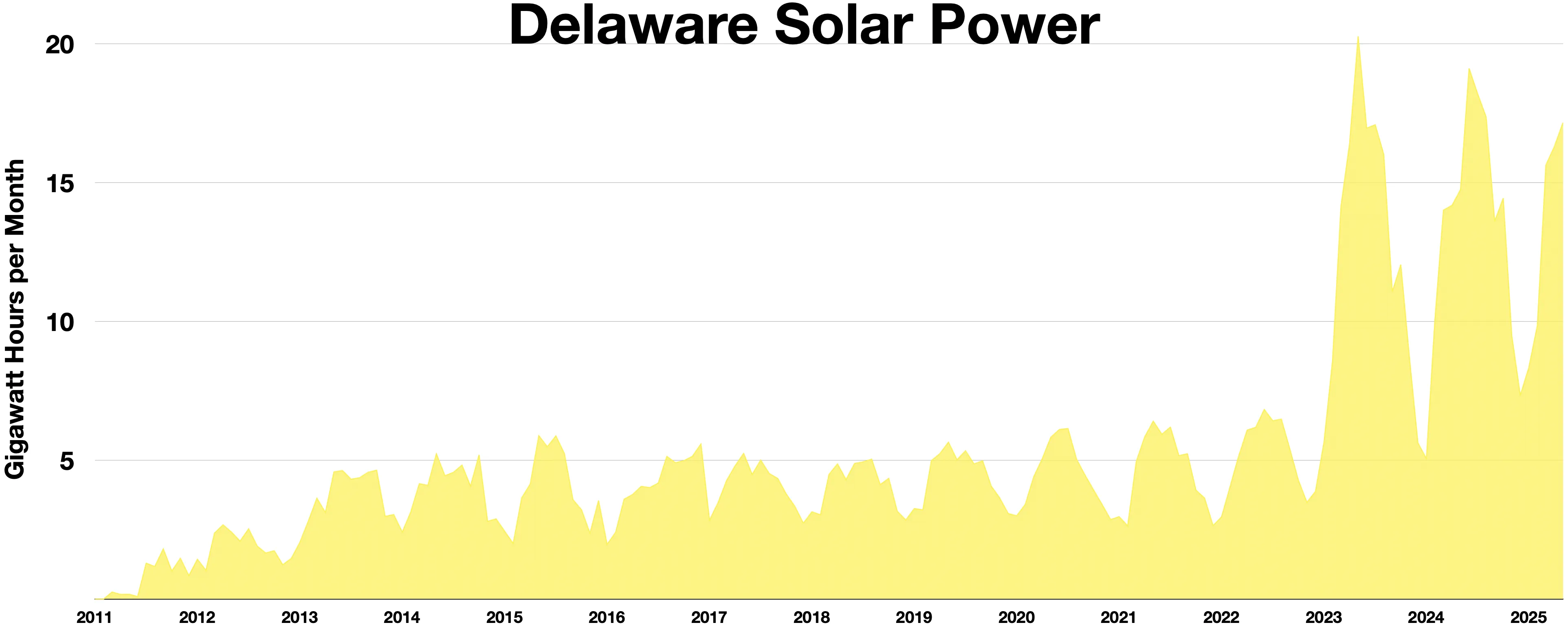
Delaware solar power from 2011 to 2025

Delaware photovoltaic capacity (MWp)
| Year | Capacity | Installed | % change |
|---|---|---|---|
| 2006 | 0.8 | | |
| 2007 | 1.2 | 0.4 | 50% |
| 2008 | 1.8 | 0.6 | 50% |
| 2009 | 3.2 | 1.4 | 78% |
| 2010 | 5.6 | 2.4 | 75% |
| 2011 | 26.5 | 20.9 | 373% |
| 2012 | 46.1 | 19.6 | 74% |
| 2013 | 54 | 7.9 | 17.1% |
| 2014 | 61 | 7 | 13% |
| 2015 | 70 | 10 | 16% |
| 2016 | 97 | 18 | 26% |
| 2017 | 117 | 20 | 20.6% |
| 2018 | 131.9 | 14.9 | 12.7% |
| 2019 | 142.1 | 10.2 | 7.7% |
| 2020 | 150.1 | 8 | 5.6% |
| 2021 | 163.2 | 13.1 | % |
| 2022 | 251 | 87.8 | % |

Utility-scale solar generation in Delaware (GWh)
| Year | Total | Jan | Feb | Mar | Apr | May | Jun | Jul | Aug | Sep | Oct | Nov | Dec |
|---|---|---|---|---|---|---|---|---|---|---|---|---|---|
| 2011 | 7 | 0 | 0 | 0 | 0 | 0 | 0 | 1 | 1 | 2 | 1 | 1 | 1 |
| 2012 | 22 | 1 | 1 | 2 | 3 | 2 | 2 | 3 | 2 | 2 | 2 | 1 | 1 |
| 2013 | 46 | 2 | 3 | 4 | 3 | 5 | 5 | 4 | 4 | 5 | 5 | 3 | 3 |
| 2014 | 48 | 2 | 3 | 4 | 4 | 5 | 5 | 5 | 5 | 4 | 5 | 3 | 3 |
| 2015 | 48 | 2 | 2 | 4 | 4 | 6 | 6 | 6 | 5 | 4 | 3 | 2 | 4 |
| 2016 | 50 | 2 | 2 | 4 | 4 | 4 | 4 | 4 | 5 | 5 | 5 | 5 | 6 |
| 2017 | 50 | 3 | 4 | 4 | 5 | 5 | 5 | 5 | 5 | 4 | 4 | 3 | 3 |
| 2018 | 49 | 3 | 3 | 5 | 5 | 4 | 5 | 5 | 5 | 4 | 4 | 3 | 3 |
| 2019 | 53 | 3 | 3 | 5 | 5 | 6 | 5 | 5 | 5 | 5 | 4 | 4 | 3 |
| 2020 | 53 | 3 | 3 | 4 | 5 | 6 | 6 | 6 | 5 | 5 | 4 | 3 | 3 |
| 2021 | 57 | 3 | 3 | 5 | 6 | 6 | 6 | 7 | 5 | 6 | 4 | 4 | 3 |
| 2022 | 63 | 3 | 4 | 5 | 6 | 6 | 7 | 7 | 7 | 6 | 4 | 4 | 4 |
| 2023 | 156 | 6 | 9 | 14 | 16 | 20 | 17 | 18 | 17 | 12 | 12 | 9 | 6 |
