= Solar power in Washington =

Solar power in Washington may refer to:

- Solar power in Washington (state)
- Solar power in Washington, D.C.
