= Amigo Energy =

- Company type: Private, subsidiary of Just Energy Group
- Industry: Electricity
- Founded: 2003
- Headquarters: Houston, Texas, United States
- Area served: Texas
- Services: Retail electricity services
- Website: www.amigoenergy.com

Established in 2003, Amigo Energy is a Texas-based retail electric provider offering residential electricity services.

The company provides a range of solutions, including fixed-rate plans, “free nights” options, and renewable energy product options, along with same-day setup and bilingual customer support in English and Spanish. Product features include no-deposit plans, bill credits, and programs to offset early termination fees.

== History ==
Amigo Energy was founded in 2003.

In May, 2007 the company merged with Fulcrum Power Services which subsequently acquired Tara Energy.

In August 2007, Amigo signed a four-year, $7.5 million sponsorship agreement for Amigo Energy to become the jersey sponsor for the Houston Dynamo, a Major League Soccer team.

In August 2011, Just Energy acquired Fulcrum Energy, including its subsidiary Amigo Energy. Just Energy (including its subsidiaries) was later acquired by IGS Energy in 2025.

== Industry ==
Amigo Energy operates exclusively in the deregulated Texas electricity market which began the process of deregulation in 2002.

The Public Utility Commission of Texas (PUCT) enforces customer protection laws for Texas residents and provides access to consumer information.

== Community Involvement ==
Amigo Energy has participated in community engagement initiatives in the Houston, Texas area through partnerships with local nonprofit organizations and educational institutions. These efforts have included education programs, such as scholarship assistance for students attending Houston Community College, where Amigo Energy has contributed funding of up to $1,000 per student per academic year to help offset educational expenses. The company has stated that its community involvement programs are intended to support local students and community development in the markets it serves.
