= Tara Energy =

American retail electricity provider

- Type: Private
- Industry: Energy
- Founded: 2002
- Headquarters: Houston, Texas, USA
- Key people: Scott White, CEO
- Products: Electricity
- Parent: IGS Energy
- Website: taraenergy.com

Tara Energy is an American retail electricity provider. It operates in Texas. It was founded in 2002, and is headquartered in Houston, Texas.

== History ==
Established in 2002, Tara Energy is a Texas-based retail electric provider offering residential and commercial electricity services within deregulated energy markets. The company provides a variety of electricity solutions, including fixed-rate plans, promotional plans such as free nights and weekends options, and sustainable energy product choices.

In August 2011, Just Energy Group acquired Fulcrum Retail Holdings LLC, which included its retail electricity subsidiaries operating in Texas. Subsequently, in 2025, Just Energy and its subsidiary brands, including Tara Energy, were acquired by IGS Energy.

== Business model ==
Tara Energy operates within the deregulated Texas electricity market, supplying electricity to residential and commercial customers under fixed-rate contracts and alternative plan structures. The company's business model involves purchasing energy supply volumes and transmission services through deregulated wholesale channels and offering retail electricity plans backed by customer support options, payment assistance programs, and digital account management tools.

== Acquisitions ==
Tara Energy became part of Fulcrum Retail Holdings LLC prior to its acquisition by Just Energy Group in August 2011. Through these corporate transitions and the subsequent 2025 acquisition by IGS Energy, Tara Energy operates as part of a broader network of retail energy brands in North America.
