= Just Energy =

Natural gas and electricity retailer

Just Energy Group Inc.
- Type: Private
- Traded as: TSX: JE; OTCID Basic: JENGQ; NYSE: JE (2012-21)
- Industry: Energy
- Founded: 1997
- Headquarters: Houston, Texas, USA
- Key people: Scott White, CEO
- Products: Natural Gas, Electricity
- Number of employees: 1,000+ (December 2011)
- Website: justenergy.com

Just Energy is an American retail electricity and natural gas provider. It operates in 16 deregulated markets in the United States and Canada. It was founded in 1997, and is headquartered in Houston, Texas.

== History ==
Established in 1997, Just Energy is a US-based natural gas and electricity retailer for residential and commercial customers in de-regulated energy markets in the United States and Canada. Just Energy is the parent company of Amigo Energy, Hudson Energy, Tara Energy, GoodBundle and HomeWater.

In 2009, the company rebranded from Energy Savings Income Fund and U.S. Energy Savings, Ontario Energy Savings, Alberta Energy Savings to Just Energy Income Fund across all of its Canadian and U.S. markets. The company incorporated in 2011 and was renamed Just Energy Group.

Just Energy entered the United Kingdom commercial energy market in July 2012 under its Hudson Energy UK brand. In October 2013, the company expanded into the UK residential market under the Green Star Energy brand, but in October 2019 it agreed to sell Green Star's customers (around 200,000 in number) to Shell Energy. In 2016, Just Energy further expanded with operations in Germany, followed by Ireland in 2017.

== Business model ==
Just Energy's business involves the sale of natural gas and/or electricity supply to residential and commercial customers under long term fixed price, price-protected or variable-priced contracts and green energy products. The company derives its margin or gross profit from the difference between the price at which it is able to sell the commodities to its customers and the related price at which it purchases the associated volumes from its suppliers.

Just Energy supplies natural gas and/or electricity in Alberta, Ontario, Quebec, and Saskatchewan in Canada; California, Delaware, Illinois, Indiana, Maryland, Massachusetts, Michigan, New Jersey, New York, Ohio, Pennsylvania, and Texas in the United States.

== Acquisitions ==
In April 2010, the company expanded its marketing distribution channel and launched a new network marketing arm under the brand, Momentis. The company completed the acquisition of Toronto-based direct energy marketer Universal Energy Corporation on July 1, 2009. From that acquisition, Just Energy gained National Home Services. In May 2010, Just Energy acquired Hudson Energy Group, an energy marketer in the U.S. commercial sector. In August 2011, Just Energy announced a deal to acquire Fulcrum Retail Holdings LLC, a privately held electricity provider operating in Texas. Just Energy (including its subsidiaries) was later acquired by IGS Energy in 2025.

== Legal and regulatory proceedings ==
In June 2003, the Toronto Star reported that both Direct Energy and the Ontario Energy Savings Corp., a subsidiary of the Energy Savings Income Fund, had been charged with fraud as a result of its agents having forged energy contracts, and had been fined. In 2010, three former Just Energy salespeople were charged in Alberta, Canada with having forged customer signatures on fraudulent energy contracts. The three defendants pleaded guilty and were fined a total of $6,800.

In July 2008, the Attorney General of New York state brought action against U.S. Energy Savings (now Just Energy) for deceptive sales practices. The company was obliged to pay $200,000 in penalties and costs to the state.

"U.S. Energy Savings (now Just Energy) is purposely deceiving consumers", Attorney General Madigan said. "Many of these families signed up for this program based on the false claim that they would save on their monthly utility bills. Instead, U.S. Energy locked them into a contract that actually charged them more for natural gas."

In response to criticism, Just Energy's CEO Ken Hartwick said in an interview with Report on Business magazine in 2013 that Just Energy dropped the savings claim years ago. Hartwick claims the company has taken steps to ensure that consumers know that they are purchasing what equates to an insurance product. He further claims all sales are followed up with a verification phone call by a third party to mitigate against any aggressive sales tactics. However, Just Energy salespeople are still making claims of savings, despite the vast majority of customers paying more. Since Hartwick's claim, Just Energy has been cited by the Ontario Energy Board in November 2013 and November 2014, and by the Attorney General of Massachusetts in January 2015, for continued infractions, including widespread deceptive sales practices. Hartwick left the company in 2014. James Lewis and Deborah Merril, who helped to found the company in 2002, became joint CEOs.

In September 2014, the police department of Sudbury, Ontario, issued a warning to the city's residents regarding the aggressive and illegal door-to-door sales activities of Just Energy sales representatives, and advised contacting the police if salespeople refuse to leave when requested.

Rebecca MacDonald, Just Energy's executive chair, has been accused of falsifying her credentials and her biography. Additionally, forensic accounting firms have determined that Just Energy uses questionable accounting practices and has misled investors as to their financial condition.

In November 2014, the Canadian Federal Competition Bureau says a subsidiary (National Energy Corp, which operates as National Home Services) of Just Energy Group Inc. has agreed to pay $7 million in penalties, restitution and other costs related to complaints over its door-to-door water heater marketing practices in Ontario and Quebec following a finding by the bureau that sales staff were misleading customers about their identity and the purpose of their visits.

In January 2015, the Attorney General's Office of Massachusetts announced that Just Energy had agreed to pay $4 million to settle allegations of deceptive marketing and overcharging consumers. According to the settlement, Just Energy charged rates that were higher than the rates for the electricity supply provided by NSTAR and National Grid, and induced elderly and non-native English speakers by continuing to offer electricity supply services even after it became clear that they did not understand the terms of the contract. Consumers were also switched to Just Energy without authorization, and termination fees worth tens of thousands of dollars were charged to small business owners who weren't advised of the charges.

A class action brought against the Just Energy group in May 2015 claimed it unlawfully denied the minimum protections of Ontario's Employment Standards Act to its door-to-door sales agents by miscategorizing them as independent contractors instead of employees.

== Bankruptcy and restructuring ==
In March 2021, after the Texas power crisis caused crushing losses, the company sought court protection under the Companies' Creditors Arrangement Act in Canada and Chapter 15 bankruptcy in the US.

The Ontario Superior Court of Justice has extended the stay period under the Companies’ Creditors Arrangement Act multiple times allowing the company to continue to operate in the ordinary course of business, while pursuing a restructuring plan with its stakeholders.

On June 16, 2021, Texas Governor Greg Abbott signed House Bill 4492, which provides a mechanism for recovery of certain costs incurred by various parties, including Just Energy, during the extreme weather event in Texas in February 2021 through certain securitization structures.

Just Energy successfully exited the CCAA on December 16, 2022.
