= Wind power in Ohio =

Electricity from wind in one U.S. state

Wind power projects in Ohio
Operating
Under construction
Proposed
Canceled or decommissioned

Wind power in Ohio has a long history. As of mid-2025, Ohio has more than 1,100 MW of installed wind generation capacity, with more than 437 MW planned to come online by the end of 2026. Ohio's first large wind farm, Timber Road II near Payne in northwest Ohio, opened on October 6, 2011. It was surpassed in June 2012 by the 304 MW Blue Creek Wind Farm.

== History ==
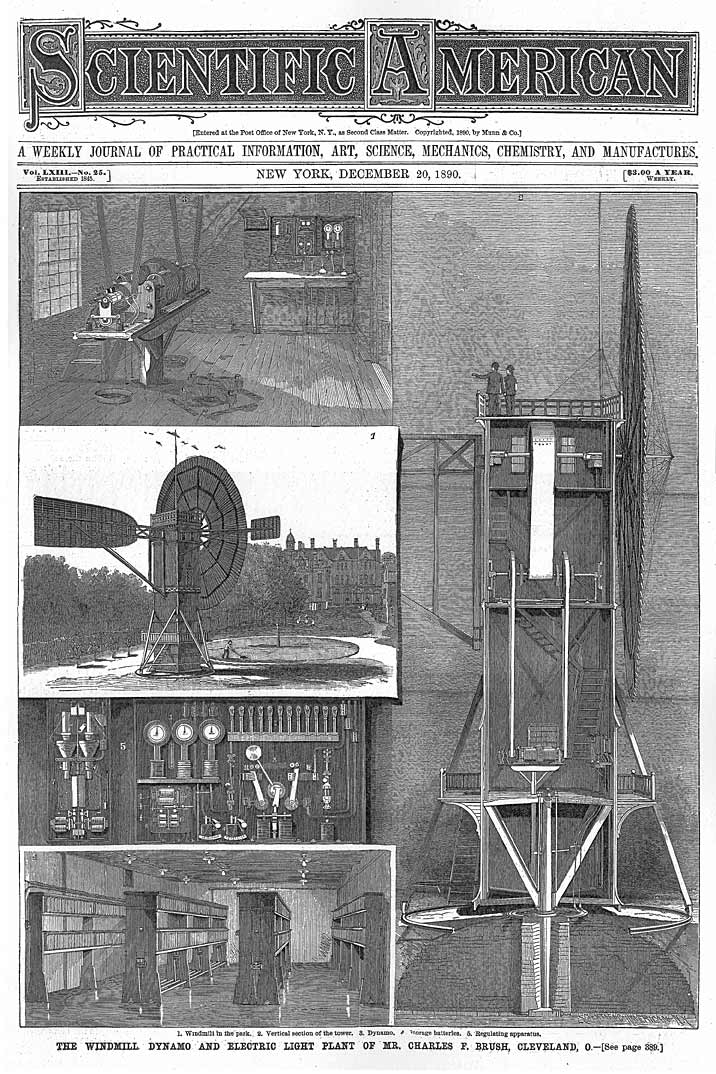
Photos of "Mr. Brush's Windmill Dynamo" from Scientific American, 1890

Wind power in Ohio has a long (albeit discontinuous) history.

=== Brush's windmill dynamo ===
Charles F. Brush designed one of the world's earliest electricity-generating windmills in Cleveland, Ohio, in 1887–1888. His engineering company built the "windmill dynamo" at his home. It operated from 1886 until 1900. The Brush wind turbine had a rotor 56 feet (17 m) in diameter and was mounted on a 60-foot (18 m) tower, making it similar in size to some of the first commercial wind farm turbines of the 1980s. However, the machine was only rated at 12 kW; it turned relatively slowly since it had 144 blades. Brush used the connected dynamo either to charge a bank of batteries or to operate up to 100 incandescent light bulbs, three arc lamps, and various motors in his laboratory. The machine fell into disuse after 1900 when electricity became available from Cleveland's central stations, and was abandoned in 1908.

=== NASA Lewis MOD series ===
From 1974 to 1981, NASA's Glenn Research Center (then the Lewis Research Center) in Brook Park, Ohio, led the U.S. Wind Energy Program for large horizontal-axis wind turbines, designing a series of 13 experimental large horizontal-axis wind turbines. In conjunction with the United States Department of Energy, NASA developed and tested megawatt-class wind turbines. The program's goal was to develop the technology, and then turn it over to private industry. While none of the program's wind turbine designs saw mass commercialization, the tests generated valuable data and pioneered modern design concepts such as tubular towers and computer control of blade pitch and rotor yaw.

Most of the MOD-series wind turbines went to sites outside of Ohio, but the first unit, the MOD-0 operated at NASA's Plum Brook facility near Sandusky from 1975 to 1988. Initially, the wind turbine had a lattice tower, a 38.1m diameter two-bladed rotor mounted downwind from the tower, and a capacity of 100 kW. Lockheed Corporation manufactured aluminum rotor blades. The discovery of severe stress resulting from the rotor blades passing through the tower's wind shadow led to several redesigns. In 1979, NASA rebuilt the MOD-0 with an upwind rotor mounted on a teetering hub, with a steel spar reinforcing the blades. In 1982, a tubular tower replaced the lattice tower. Finally, in 1985 NASA tested a single-bladed rotor with a teetering hub. In 1981, two NASA Glenn engineers, Larry Viterna and Bob Corrigan, used the adjustable-pitch blade feature of the MOD-0 to invent an analytical method for calculating wind turbine output in high winds, which has since become widely used in the wind power industry as the Viterna method.

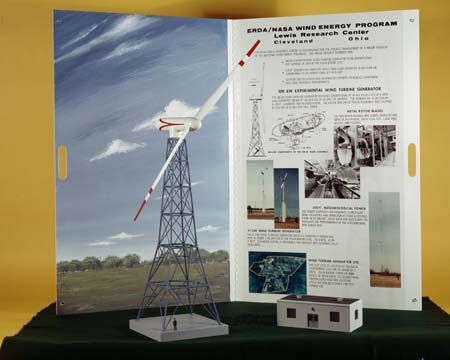
Model and display board of NASA MOD-0 experimental wind turbine

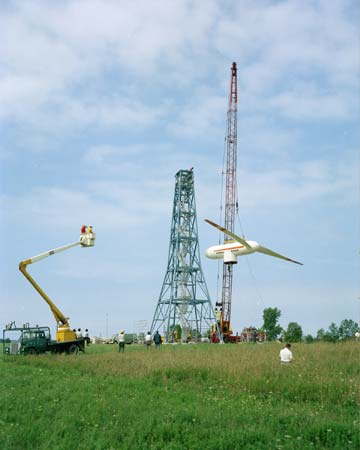
Constructing the MOD-0 in 1975

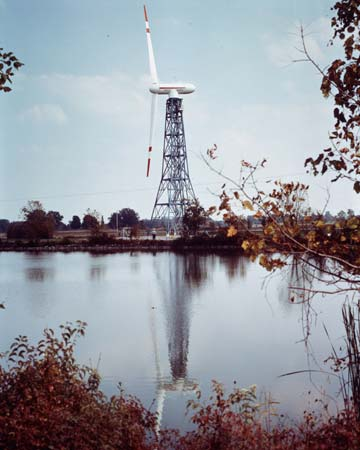
MOD-0, initial configuration, at Glenn Research Center's Plum Brook station near Sandusky, Ohio

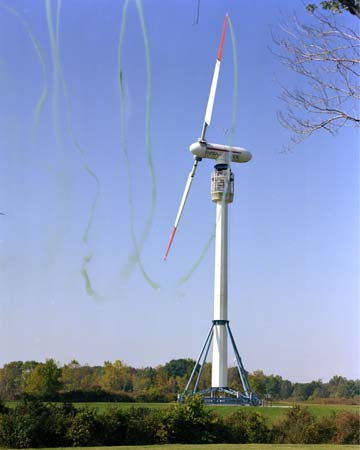
MOD-0, smoke test, downwind rotor configuration, 1982

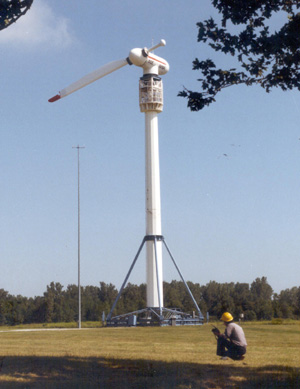
MOD-0 research wind turbine in one-bladed configuration

=== Wind turbine regulation ===
In 2014, the Ohio General Assembly passed HB 483. This codified a wind turbine setback of 1,125 feet (343 m) from the property line for significant wind farms. The change in wind turbine setbacks has discouraged investment in new wind farm development in Ohio.

== Installed capacity and wind resources ==
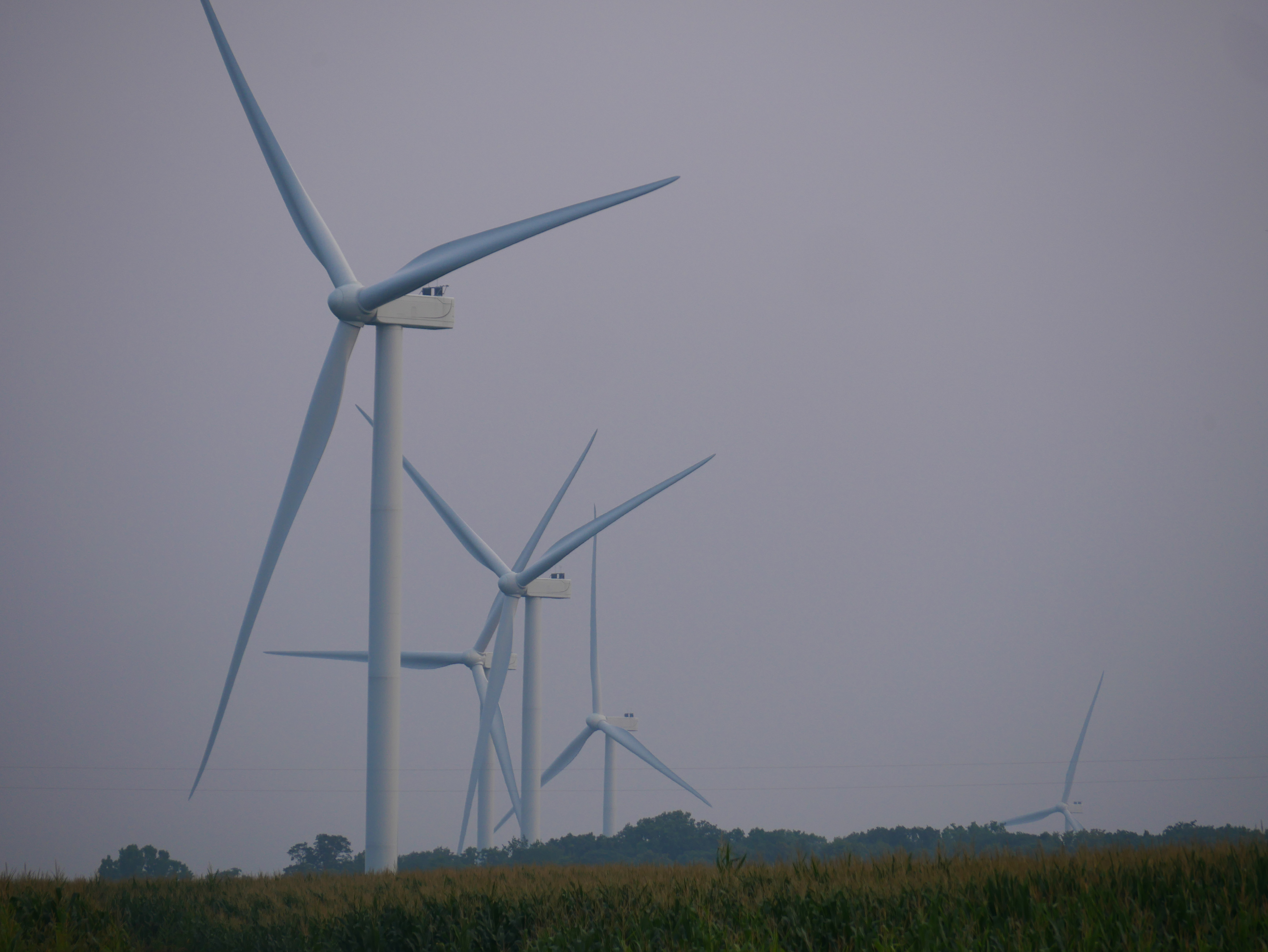
Scioto Ridge Wind Farm

The following table compares the growth in wind power installed nameplate capacity in megawatts (MW) for Ohio and the entire United States from 2002 through 2019.

| Year | Ohio | US |
|---|---|---|
| 2002 | 0 | 4,687 |
| 2003 | 3.6 | 6,350 |
| 2004 | 7.2 | 6,723 |
| 2005 | 7.2 | 9,147 |
| 2006 | 7.4 | 11,575 |
| 2007 | 7.4 | 16,907 |
| 2008 | 7.4 | 25,410 |
| 2009 | 7.4 | 34,863 |
| 2010 | 9.6 | 40,267 |
| 2011 | 112 | 46,916 |
| 2012 | 428 | 60,005 |
| 2013 | 428 | 61,107 |
| 2014 | 435 | 65,880 |
| 2015 | 443 | 74,471 |
| 2016 | 545 | 82,171 |
| 2017 | 617 | 89,078 |
| 2018 | 729 | 96,487 |
| 2019 | 738 | 105,583 |
| 2020 | 864 | 122,478 |

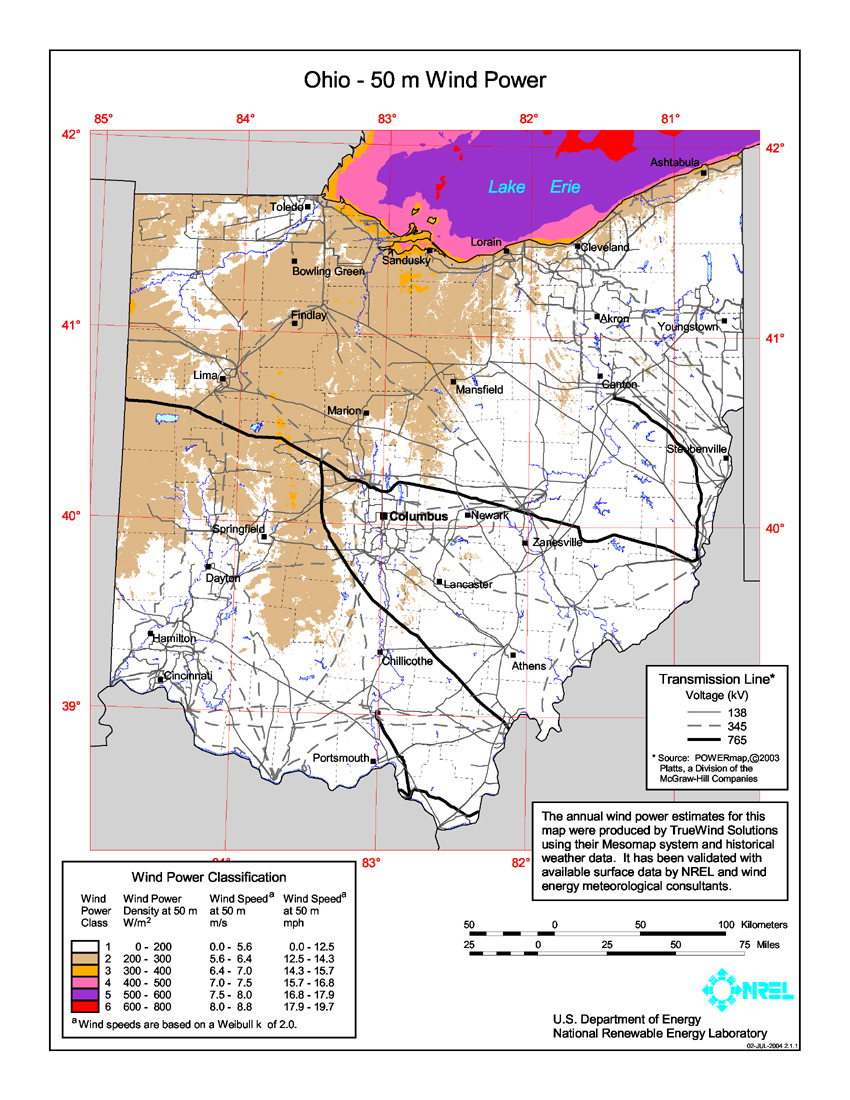
Average annual wind power density map for Ohio at 50m above ground

One large undeveloped resource of wind in Ohio is Lake Erie. Its shallow depth and shelter from hurricanes provide advantages in terms of both ease of construction as well as safety of the investment. Although land based wind farms frequently have lower siting costs, offshore wind farms usually have better wind, as open water lacks obstructions such as forests, buildings, and hills.

On February 11, 2010, the National Renewable Energy Laboratory released the first comprehensive update of the wind energy potential by state since 1993, showing that Ohio had potential to install 55 GW of onshore wind power nameplate capacity, generating 152 TWh annually. For comparison, Ohio consumed 160.176 TWh of electricity in 2005; the entire U.S. wind power industry was producing at an annual rate of approximately 50 TWh at the end of 2008; and Three Gorges Dam (the world's largest electricity-generating station) produced an average of 80 TWh/yr in 2008 and 2009.

== Wind farms ==
In 2008, Ohio had one utility-scale wind farm, one single large turbine wind power installation, and two more in development.

=== American Municipal Power Inc Wind Farm ===
The AMP Wind Farm is located west of Bowling Green in Wood County (41.379481°N 83.737707°W). It is Ohio's first utility-scale wind farm. It consists of four Vestas V80-1.8MW wind turbines with a combined nameplate capacity of 7.2 MW. The first two units came online in 2003, and the second two in 2004, next to the Wood County landfill. In 2015 the wind turbines were paid off. Because the turbines are early models, the operators have had difficulty sourcing replacement parts. The US$10 million wind farm's wind turbines are highly visible for miles in all directions, and have become a tourist attraction, regularly hosting busloads of school children. A solar-powered kiosk on the site gives data to visitors about the project, the current wind speed, and real-time power generation.

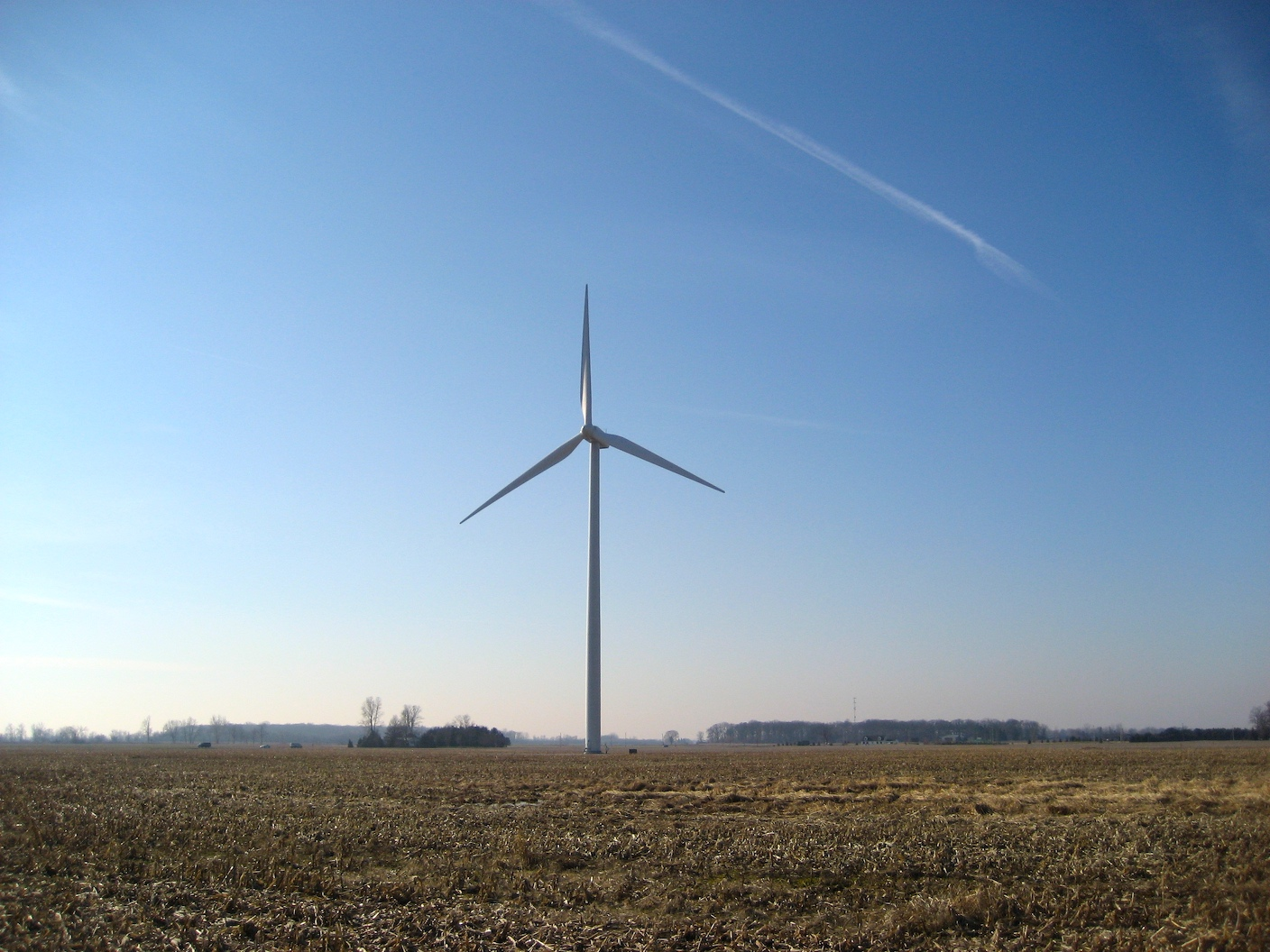
Vestas V80-1.8MW wind turbine outside Bowling Green, Ohio

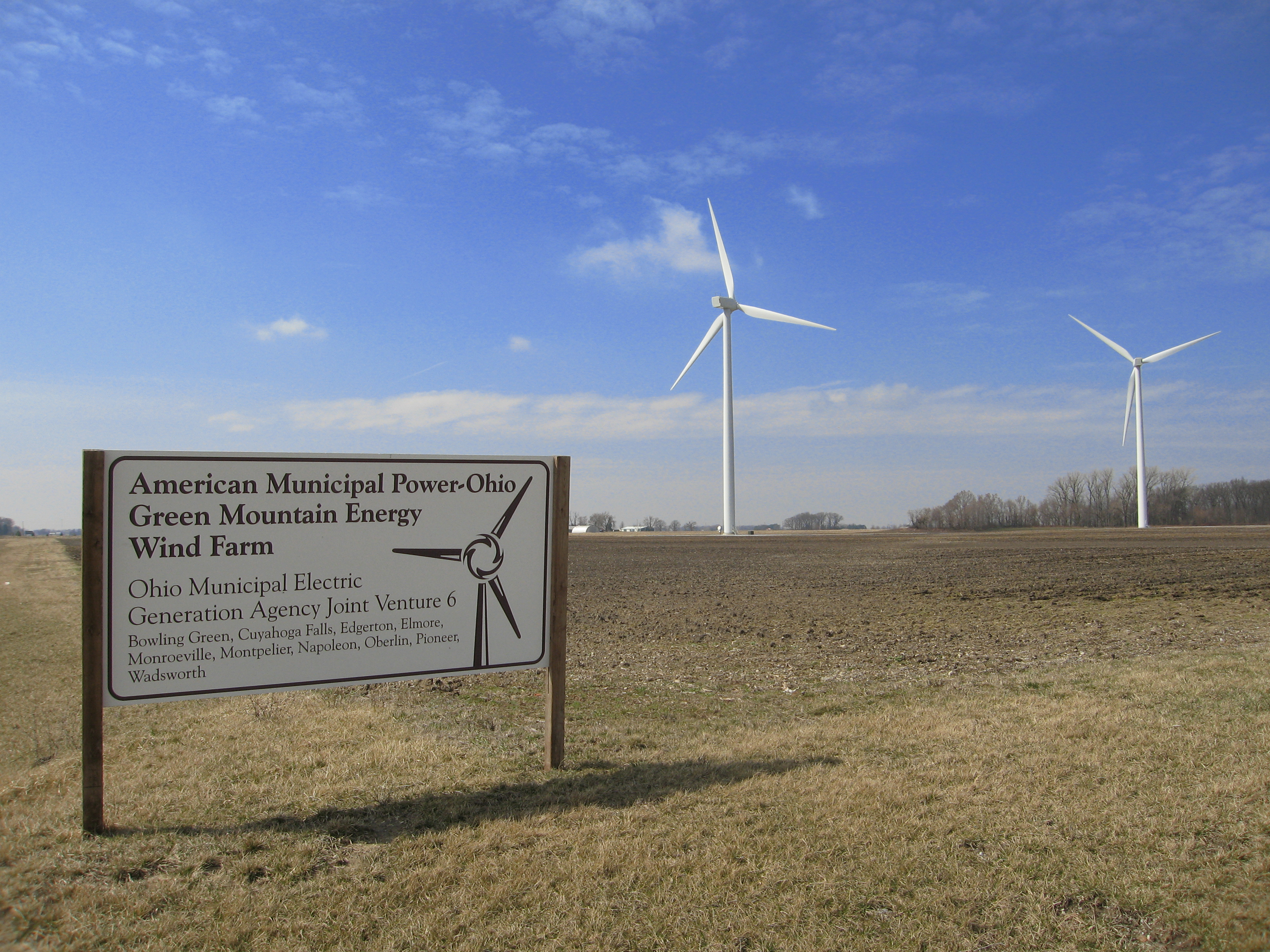
Entrance sign, south turbines

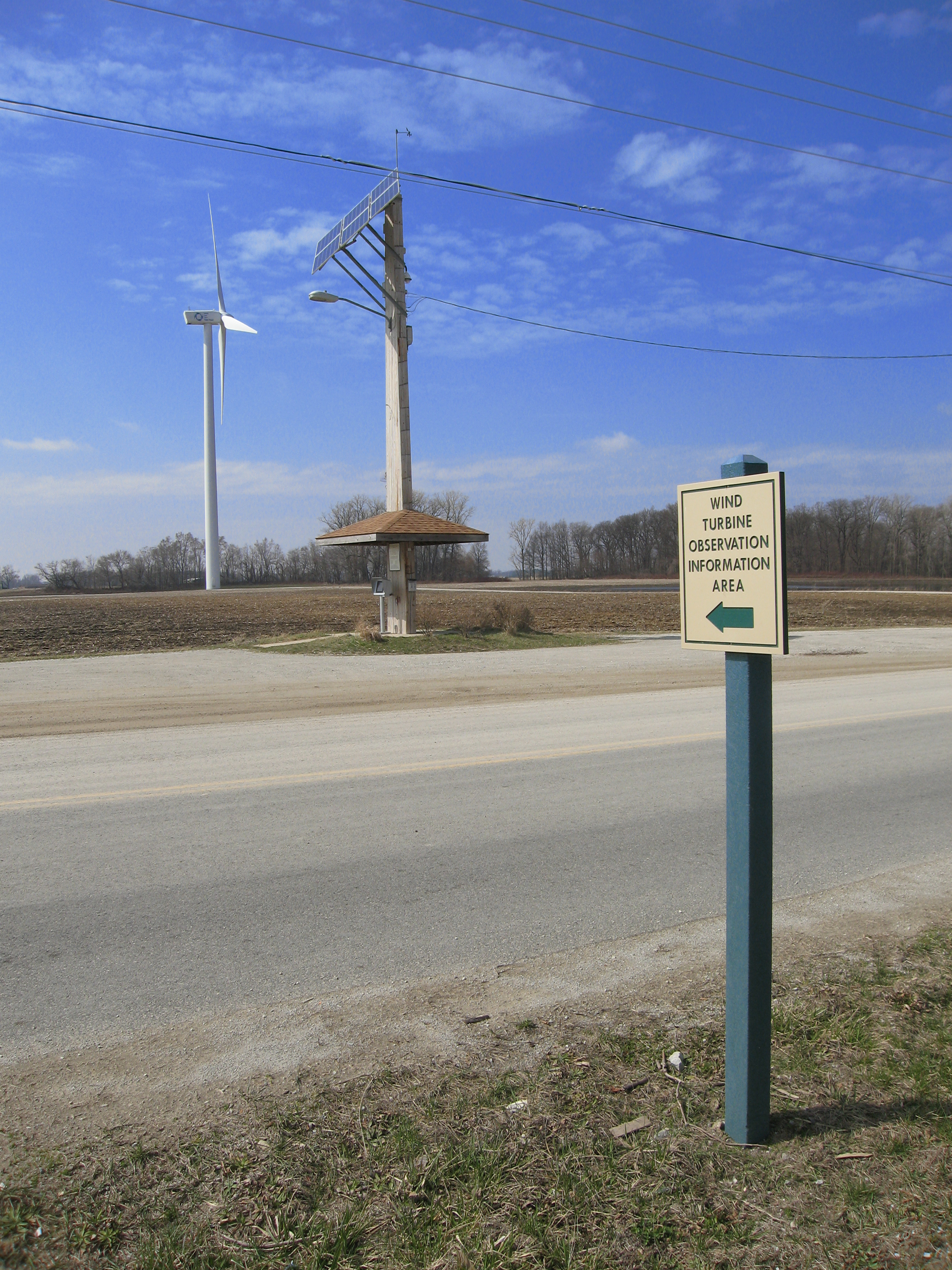
Visitor area and information kiosk

=== Great Lakes Science Center ===
The Great Lakes Science Center installed a reconditioned Vestas V27-225 kW wind turbine in 2006, outside its museum building on Cleveland's North Coast Harbor between Cleveland Browns Stadium and the Rock and Roll Hall of Fame (41.506661°N 81.696769°W). The North Coast entertainment complex receives 1.5 million visitors per year, and the wind turbine appears regularly on local news broadcasts and Cleveland Browns NFL broadcasts, making it one of the world's most-viewed wind turbines.

The wind turbine originally operated on a wind farm in Denmark, which resold the wind turbine while repowering to newer, larger wind turbines. The ground around the wind turbine features an art display entitled Shadow and Light. The display includes walkways that align with the wind turbine's shadow at solar noon and two hours, eleven minutes after solar noon, respectively. On the vernal and autumnal equinoxes, the wind turbine's shadow also aligns with the walkways by length. Thus the wind turbine functions as a large gnomon in an incomplete sundial. The display includes boxes of light bulbs encased in concrete on one side of a plaza around the wind turbine's base, representing the amount of electricity consumed by the average American household in a year.

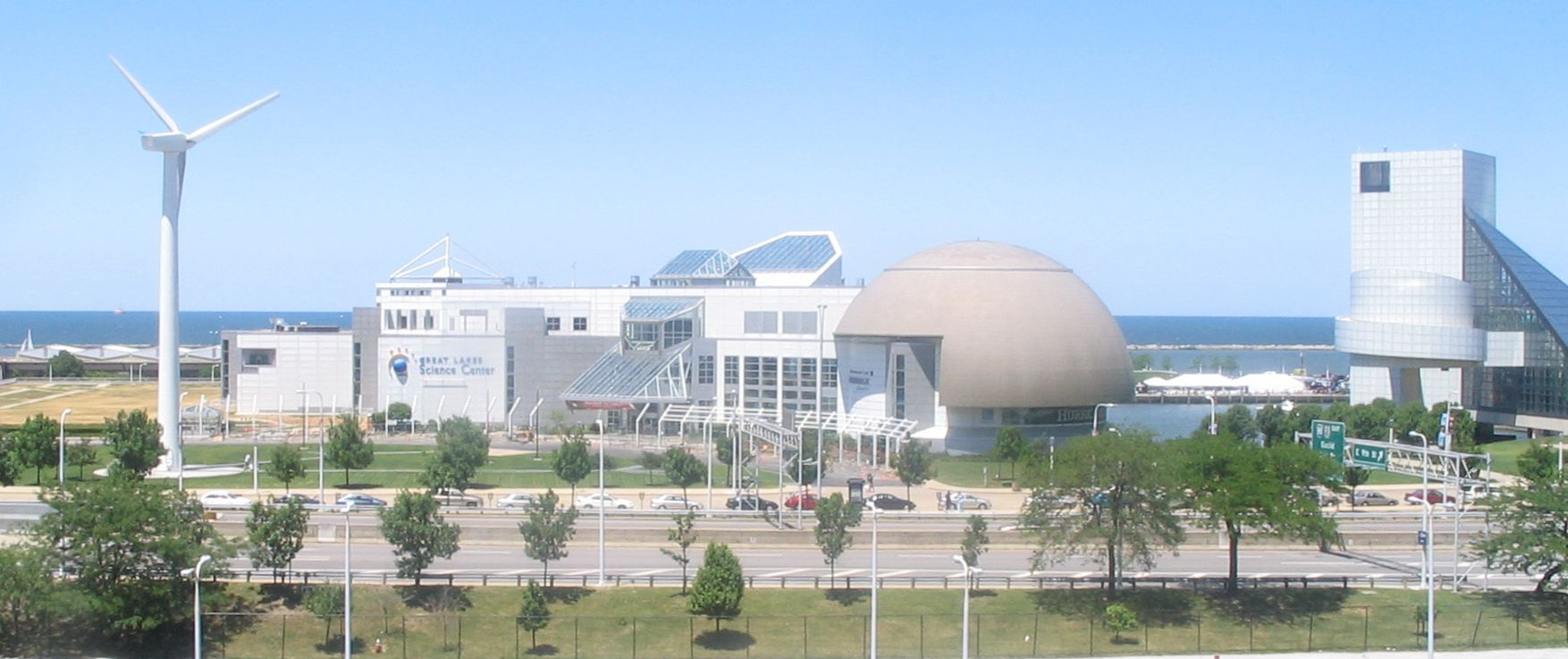
Vestas V27 at the Great Lakes Science Center in Cleveland, Ohio

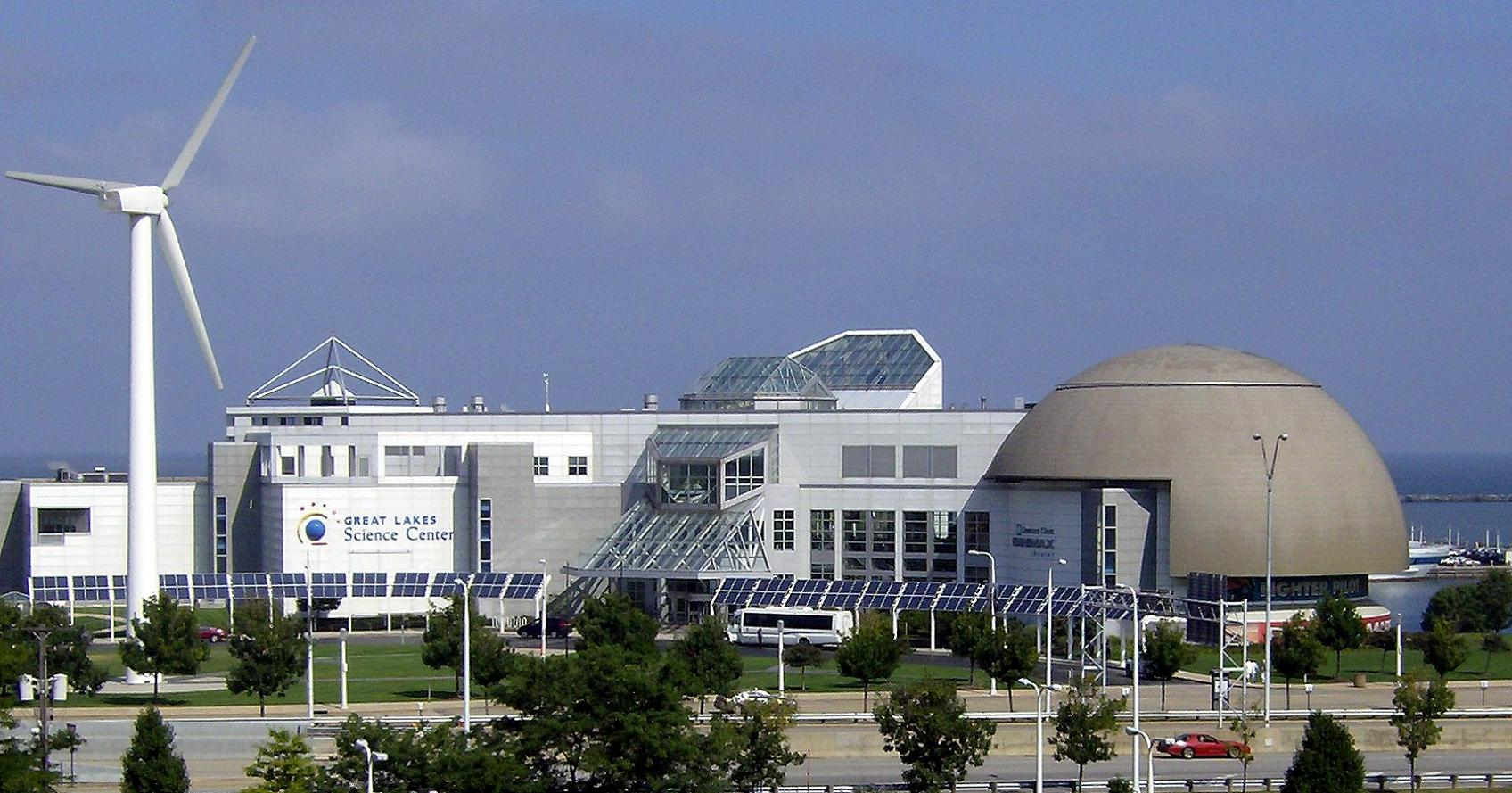
Another view of the GLSC and its wind turbine

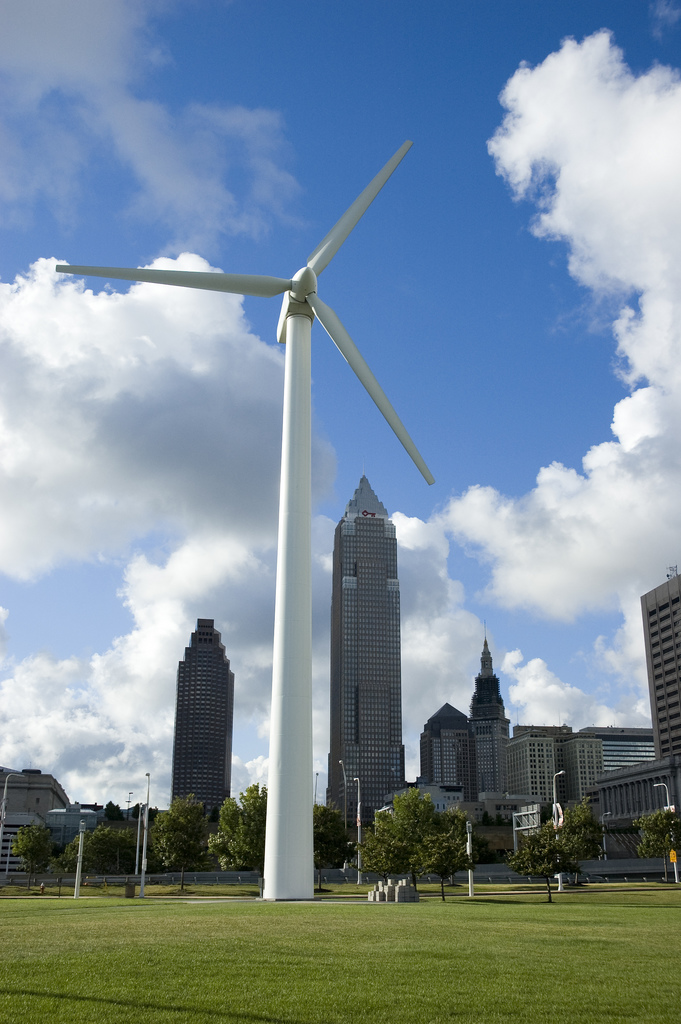
Closeup photo of the wind turbine against the Cleveland skyline

=== One Energy Wind for Industry projects ===
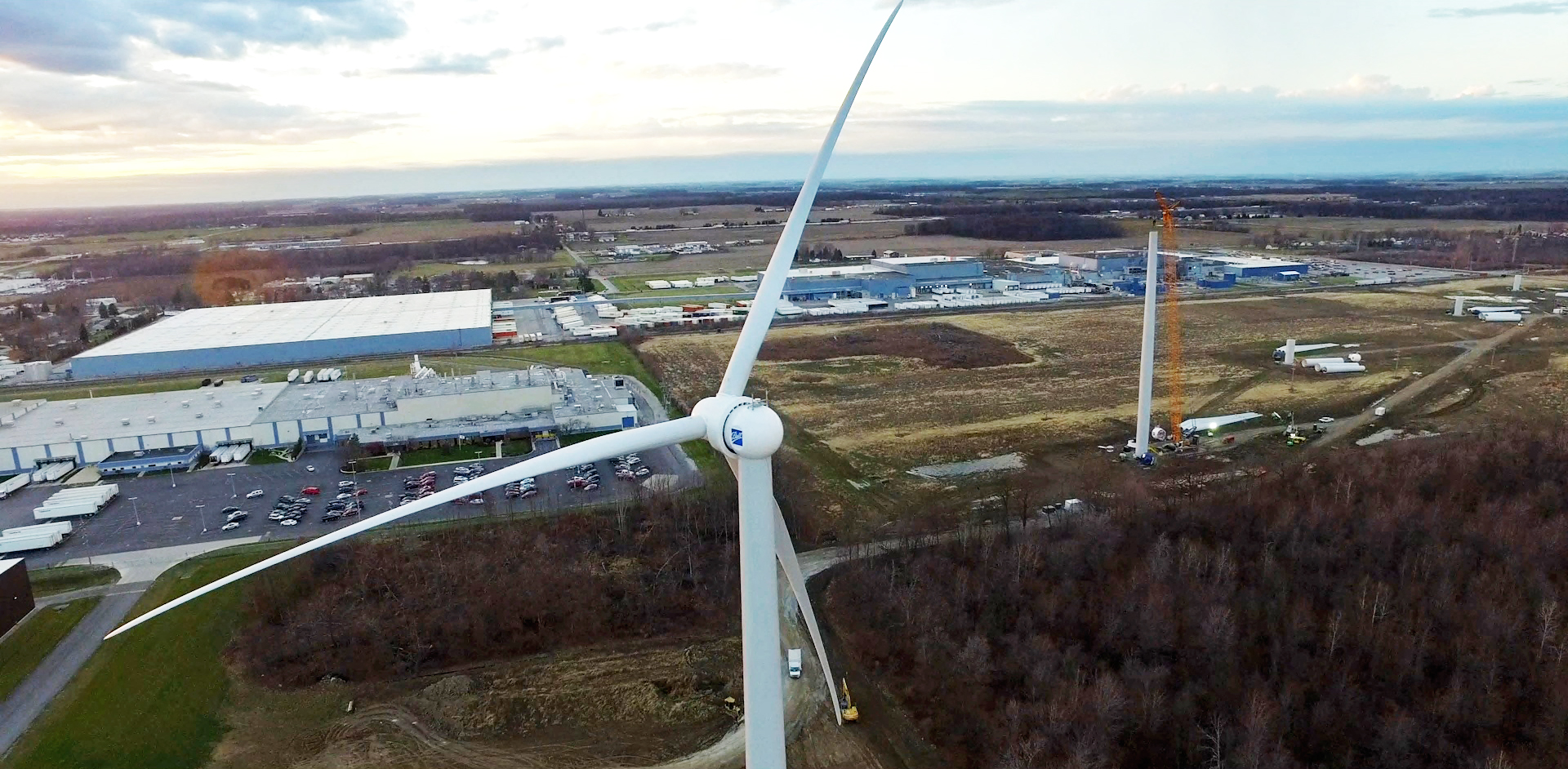
Wind for Industry turbine built for Ball Corporation's metal division in Findlay, Ohio

Findlay, Ohio, based on-site distributed-generation wind energy company One Energy has developed and constructed nine Wind for Industry projects to date, with three projects in construction as of October 2018. Wind for Industry describes wind energy projects in which utility-scale wind turbines are installed on-site and interconnected on a facility's side of their utility meter (a process known as distributed generation or behind-the-meter wind, which sometimes follows net metering). These projects are designed to achieve a significant reduction of an industrial facility's electrical consumption from the grid. One Energy's on-site generation list includes:

Wind for Industry projects
| Name | Location | Power | Note |
|---|---|---|---|
| Cooper Farms’ Wind VW | Van Wert, Ohio | 4.5 MW | Operating since 2011 |
| Haviland Wind | Haviland, Ohio | 4.5 MW | Operating since 2012 |
| Ball Corporation's Zephyr Wind Project | Findlay, Ohio | 4.5 MW | Operating since 2015 |
| Whirlpool Corporation's Findlay Wind Farm | Findlay, Ohio | 3.0 MW | Operating since 2015 |
| Marathon Petroleum's Harpster Wind | Harpster, Ohio | 1.5 MW | Operating since 2016 |
| Whirlpool Corporation's Marion Wind Project | Marion, Ohio | 4.5 MW | Operating since 2017 |
| Whirlpool Corporation's Ottawa Wind Project | Ottawa, Ohio | 1.5 MW | Operating since 2018 |
| Valfilm Corporation's Findlay Wind Farm | Findlay, Ohio | 3.0 MW | Operating since 2018 |
| Whirlpool Corporation's Greenville Wind Farm | Greenville, Ohio | 4.5 MW | Powering a KitchenAid facility. Operating since 2018. |
| Autoliv-Nissin Brake Systems Findlay Wind Project | Findlay, Ohio | 1.5 MW | In construction 2018 |

== Wind generation ==
Ohio wind generation (GWh, million kWh)
| Year | Total | Jan | Feb | Mar | Apr | May | Jun | Jul | Aug | Sep | Oct | Nov | Dec |
|---|---|---|---|---|---|---|---|---|---|---|---|---|---|
| 2005 | 15 | 1 | 1 | 1 | 1 | 1 | 1 | 1 | 1 | 1 | 2 | 2 | 2 |
| 2006 | 14 | 2 | 1 | 1 | 1 | 1 | 1 | 1 | 1 | 1 | 1 | 1 | 2 |
| 2007 | 16 | 1 | 1 | 1 | 1 | 2 | 1 | 1 | 1 | 1 | 2 | 2 | 2 |
| 2008 | 16 | 1 | 1 | 1 | 1 | 1 | 1 | 1 | 1 | 1 | 2 | 2 | 3 |
| 2009 | 14 | 1 | 1 | 1 | 2 | 1 | 1 | 1 | 1 | 0 | 1 | 2 | 2 |
| 2010 | 13 | 1 | 1 | 1 | 1 | 1 | 1 | 1 | 1 | 1 | 1 | 2 | 1 |
| 2011 | 198 | 1 | 1 | 1 | 2 | 1 | 1 | 12 | 13 | 26 | 28 | 50 | 62 |
| 2012 | 986 | 113 | 94 | 117 | 111 | 50 | 68 | 42 | 36 | 52 | 119 | 72 | 112 |
| 2013 | 1,146 | 140 | 107 | 114 | 111 | 102 | 59 | 49 | 36 | 55 | 93 | 143 | 137 |
| 2014 | 1,154 | 168 | 96 | 119 | 136 | 96 | 63 | 56 | 36 | 36 | 100 | 145 | 103 |
| 2015 | 1,202 | 127 | 109 | 107 | 120 | 95 | 80 | 47 | 45 | 56 | 128 | 140 | 148 |
| 2016 | 1,246 | 162 | 140 | 127 | 113 | 87 | 74 | 48 | 40 | 57 | 98 | 123 | 177 |
| 2017 | 1,589 | 163 | 171 | 172 | 154 | 141 | 125 | 62 | 54 | 65 | 143 | 162 | 177 |
| 2018 | 1,751 | 225 | 163 | 186 | 148 | 135 | 90 | 67 | 75 | 102 | 179 | 183 | 198 |
| 2019 | 2,044 | 245 | 190 | 209 | 212 | 165 | 154 | 92 | 85 | 96 | 179 | 178 | 239 |
| 2020 | 2,287 | 221 | 212 | 203 | 198 | 209 | 167 | 96 | 88 | 147 | 196 | 279 | 271 |
| 2021 | 2,598 | 189 | 221 | 284 | 221 | 194 | 202 | 117 | 105 | 240 | 205 | 293 | 327 |
| 2022 | 3,151 | 312 | 354 | 364 | 325 | 280 | 187 | 149 | 110 | 140 | 287 | 347 | 296 |
| 2023 | 965 | 279 | 338 | 348 | | | | | | | | | |

== See also ==
- Solar power in Ohio
- Energy sector of Ohio
- Wind power in the United States
- Renewable energy in the United States
