= Energy in Ohio =

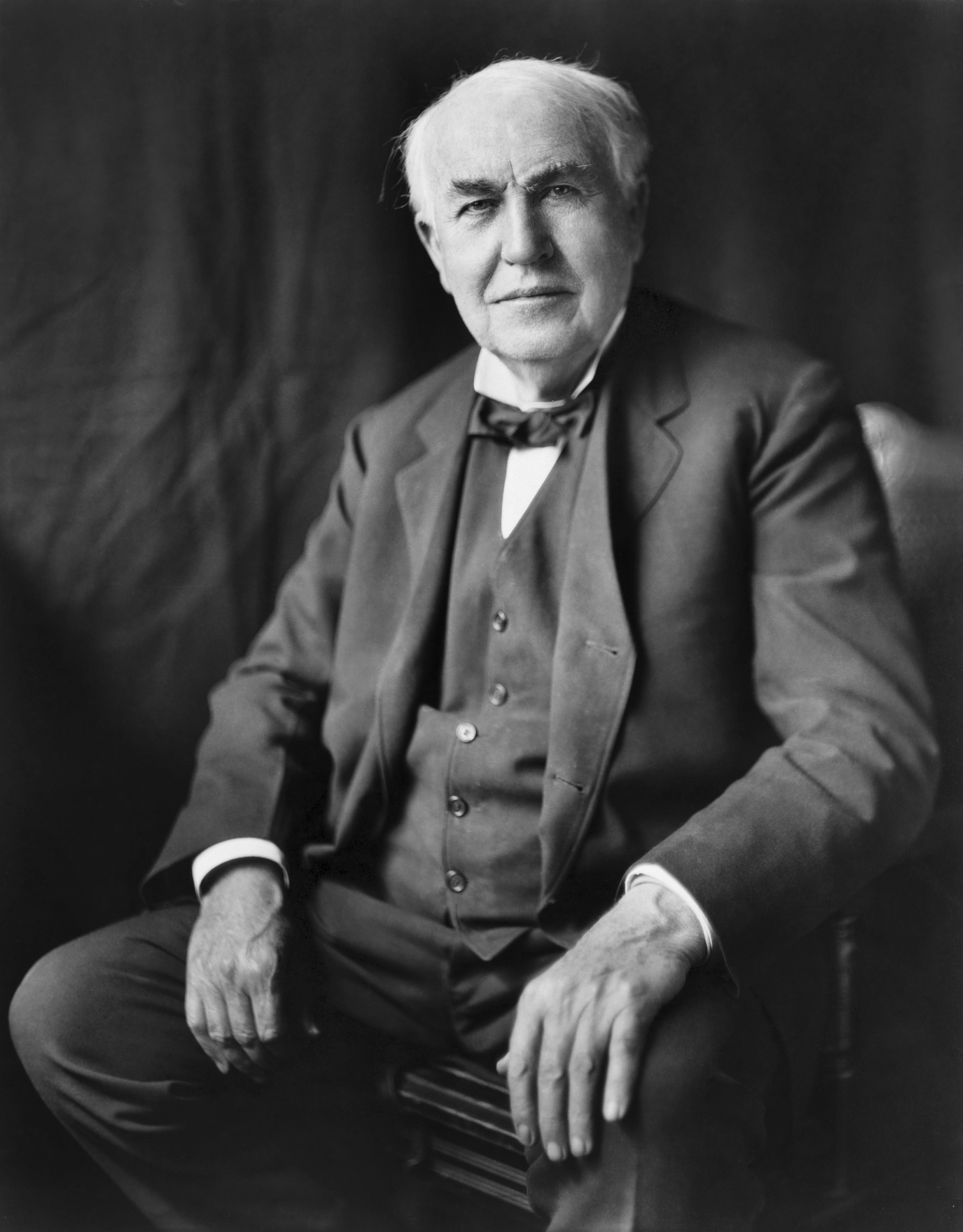
Thomas Edison, a native of Milan, is widely regarded as the originator of mass-energy generation and distribution concepts.

The energy sector of Ohio consists of thousands of companies and cities representing the oil, natural gas, coal, solar, wind energy, fuel cell, biofuel, geothermal, hydroelectric, and other related industries. Oil and natural gas accounts for $3.1 billion annually in sales while ethanol generates $750 million. Toledo is a national hub in solar cell manufacturing, and the state has significant production of fuel cells. In 2008, the state led the country in alternative energy manufacturing according to Site Selection Magazine, while the natural gas industry has experienced growth due to the expansion of shale gas.

Several notable energy companies are headquartered in Ohio, including American Electric Power, Columbia Gas of Ohio, DPL Inc., Marathon Petroleum Company, American Municipal Power, Inc., Cleveland-Cliffs, Murray Energy, FirstEnergy, Oxford Resource Partners LP, AB Resources, American Hydrogen Corporation, and IGS Energy. Rolls-Royce North America's Energy Systems Inc. is headquartered in Mt. Vernon, specializing in gas compression, power generation, and pipeline technologies. Ultra Premium Oilfield Services and V&M Star Steel operate steel production facilities in the state, which cater to energy exploration.

Ohio consumed 160.176 TWh of electricity in 2005, fourth among U.S. states, and has a storied history in the sector, including the first offshore oil drilling platform in the world, and a modern, renewable energy economy along with the traditional nuclear, oil, coal, and gas industries.

Ohio has been ranked last in addressing environmental issues and alternative energy consumption and 47th in carbon footprint. The modern American environmental movement concerning legislation and awareness can largely be traced back to the Cuyahoga River fire of June 22, 1969.

== Early innovation ==
Thomas Edison, a native of Milan, is widely regarded as a father of the modern industrialized world and the originator of mass-energy generation and distribution concepts, as well as the long-lasting, practical electric light bulb. Another Ohio native, Charles F. Brush is said to have invented the first electric dynamo, resulting in the present-day United Kingdom–based Brush Electrical Machines. Arthur Compton, of Wooster, invented the fluorescent light tube and was a pioneer in the study of atomic energy.

== Oil and natural gas ==
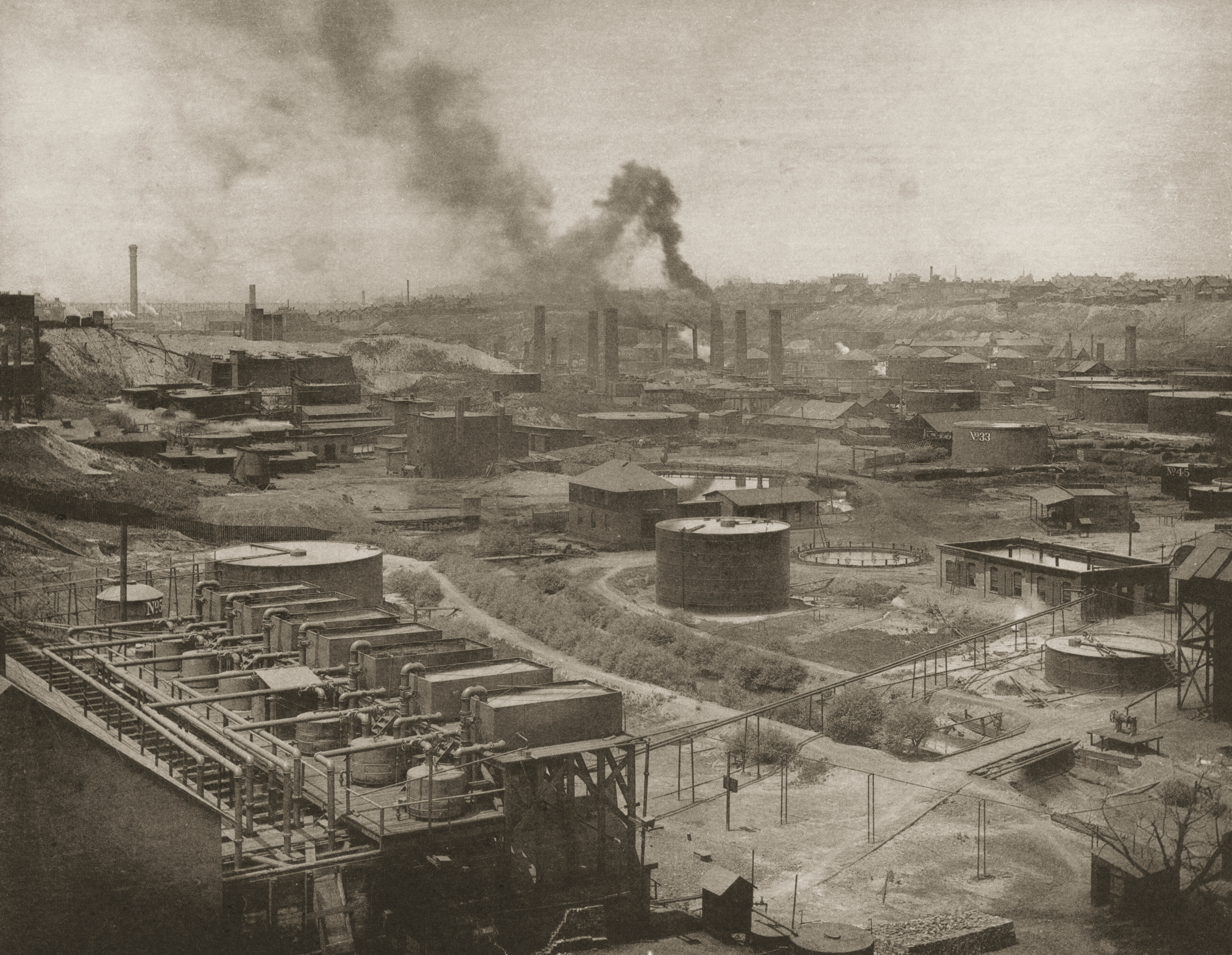
Standard Oil refinery in Cleveland, 1899. Ohio was a world leader in oil production in the late 19th and early 20th centuries.

The Ohio oil and natural gas industries employ 14,400 citizens, resulting in $730 million in wages. The industries paid $202 million in royalties to landowners, and $84 million in free energy. The state's oil and natural gas industry continues to grow, having topped the $1 billion mark in market value production for four consecutive years, including $1.35 billion in 2008. This has only been accomplished five times in state history. The oil and gas industry contributed $1.5 billion to the gross state product in 2008, and $3.1 billion in sales.

Ohio was one of the original modern-energy states in the world starting in the 19th century and has a storied history. The first discovery of oil from a drilled well and first offshore oil rig placed in world history occurred in Ohio in 1814 in Noble County, and 1891 at Grand Lake St. Marys. Ohio was the country's lead producer of oil between 1895 and 1903, until technology allowed further developments throughout the nation. Since that first well drilled in 1814 by Silas Thora and Robert McKee in Noble County, the state has drilled 273,000 wells, ranking it fourth nationally behind Texas, Oklahoma, and Pennsylvania historically.

At peak production, the state produced 24,000,000 barrels (3,800,000 m^{3}) of oil in 1896. They produced the world's first billionaire, John D. Rockefeller, as a result. Standard Oil was first headquartered in Cleveland, beginning in 1870. The state has produced 1,120,000,000 barrels (178,000,000 m^{3}) since 1860.

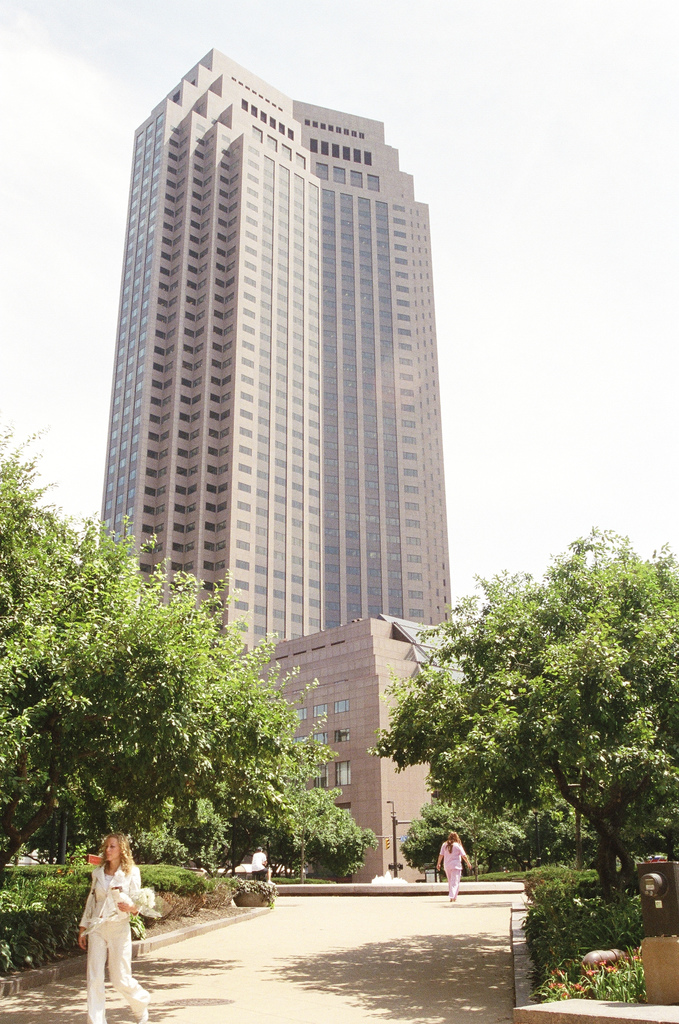
200 Public Square in Cleveland was formerly the headquarters of Standard Oil of Ohio and later BP America.

In 2007, the state produced 5,455,000 barrels (867,300 m^{3}) of crude, and increased production to 5,554,000 barrels (883,000 m^{3}) in 2008, ranking #17 in the country. The state is fourth in the country in total wells drilled, including natural gas, only trailing Texas, Oklahoma, and Pennsylvania, and having drilled 1,048 new wells in 2008. Offshore oil drilling in Lake Erie first occurred in 1913, and the lake is home to oil reserves.

Ohio has the second largest oil refining capacity in the Midwest. Toledo is home to facilities operated by PBF Energy and BP, totaling over 300,000 BPD capacity. The BP facility is undergoing a $400 million renovation and is expected to receive nearly exclusive supplies from a $2.5 billion oilsands project in Alberta by 2011. Toledo is also a target destination for supplies coming from the Bakken Oil Fields.

Natural gas was discovered in Clinton County in 1887. In 2008, the state produced 85 billion cubic feet of natural gas, which nearly 100% of the production stayed in the state, enough to heat 1 million homes. The Rockies Express Pipeline was recently completed, connecting the eastern part of Ohio with natural gas production facilities in Colorado. 1.1 trillion cubic feet of natural gas reserves are estimated to be in Ohio's portion of Lake Erie alone.

The Marathon Petroleum Company and IGS Energy are major oil and natural gas companies headquartered in the state, with Speedway, headquartered in Enon, serving as a gasoline distributor of Marathon. Natural gas supplier Delta Energy completed the construction of its new headquarters in Dublin in the summer of 2011.

=== Devonian Shales ===
In 1951, the process of hydraulic fracturing was used in Ohio to extract oil and gas. Beneath Ohio rests part of the Devonian Shales, which contain large quantities of natural gas and oil reserves, and is one of the world's largest concentrations of organic carbon.

Part of the Devonian Shale is the Marcellus Shale, which alone is estimated to hold between 168 trillion and 516 trillion cubic feet of natural gas. Recent technological advances have made the recovery of these reserves possible, and the state has experienced a boom in drilling. It is estimated that 423 billion barrels (67.3×10^{9} m^{3}) of oil are present in the Devonian-Mississippi Shale, with 98% of the near-surface mineable resources located in Ohio, Kentucky, Indiana, and Tennessee.

==== Great Shale Gas Rush ====
By March 2010, The Intelligencer, based in neighboring Wheeling, West Virginia, had declared that a "gas rush" was occurring with the Marcellus Shale in the area and that property was "hot". May saw the $4.7 billion acquisition by Royal Dutch Shell of East Resources's drilling property in neighboring states.

Intense leasing activity was reported in eastern Ohio in September, including Gastar Exploration and South Korea–based Atinum Partners citing Ohio acreage in a $70 million deal. Pennsylvania-based CONSOL Energy began drilling Belmont County, while Anschutz Exploration Corporation announced that month it had sold 500,000 acres (2,000 km^{2}) of its oil and natural gas fields, including in Ohio, for $3 billion.

By October, National Geographic had officially coined the boom as the "Great Shale Gas Rush", with 70 energy companies prospecting New York, Pennsylvania, West Virginia, and Ohio with plans to drill 3,500 well a year over the next decade with the potential of 200,000 new employment positions.

In August 2011, Chesapeake Energy announced it would open a field office in Canton. In September 2011, Hess Corporation announced a $750 million play in the state's Utica Shale.

===== Infrastructure =====
V&M Star Steel, a subsidiary of France-based Vallourec, announced plans to construct a $650 million plant in Youngstown in February 2010 because of the drilling boom, expanding existing operations in the state, which broke ground in June of that year. Later in February, Russia-based TMK IPSCO opened a production facility in Brookfield through a subsidiary, Ultra Premium Oilfield Services, with the Marcellus Shale exploration boom cited as the reason. By June 2010, TMK IPSCO had cited increasing sales commensurate with the "boom".

In July 2010, the U.S. Department of Labor announced a $5 million grant to train workers for Marcellus shale drilling, including laborers in Ohio. In August of that year, Kinder Morgan announced plans to construct a 230-240 mile-long underground pipeline, which would transport recovered natural gas supplies in Western Pennsylvania from West Virginia to Toledo, ultimately connecting with existing pipelines in Michigan and Southern Ontario. In September, Warren's water treatment facility announced plans to become the first in the state to accept waste water from shale drilling, while at the 2010 Marcellus Summit in State College, Pennsylvania, state officials announced they were working with local officials on bonding issues for new infrastructure.

Laurel Mountain Midstream announced in October plans to expand its pipeline collection system covering wells in Ohio, and later that month Texas-based El Paso Midstream Group and Spectra Energy signed a memorandum of understanding to construct their Marcellus Ethane Pipeline System to connect existing Ohio and Pennsylvania pipelines with Gulf Coast destinations. Later that month U.S. Steel announced their Lorain facility would begin work to meet the demands of drilling activities.

===== Environmental concerns =====
In October 2010, it was reported that drilling in the shale was causing uranium deposits to be released. Reuters reports that fracking has been linked to earthquakes in Ohio. In 2011, there were 11 earthquakes that took place in the area, where earthquakes were unknown prior to commencement of gas extraction.

On October 2, 2013, a series of six earthquakes were located south of Clendening Lake in Harrison County, Ohio, and included two Mw 2.0 events. This series was followed by four more events with M_{w} 1.7–2.2 from 3 to 19 October. There were no felt reports for any of these earthquakes. According to historical catalogs, this series of earthquakes is the first known seismic occurrence in the region. Based on the Ohio Department of Natural Resources (ODNR) map of oil and gas wells in the area, at least seven horizontal wells had undergone hydraulic fracturing near and around Clendening Lake from February to October 2013. Several corroborating evidences show that it is most probable that hydraulic fracturing on the wells induced the 2013 Harrison earthquake sequence.

== Coal ==
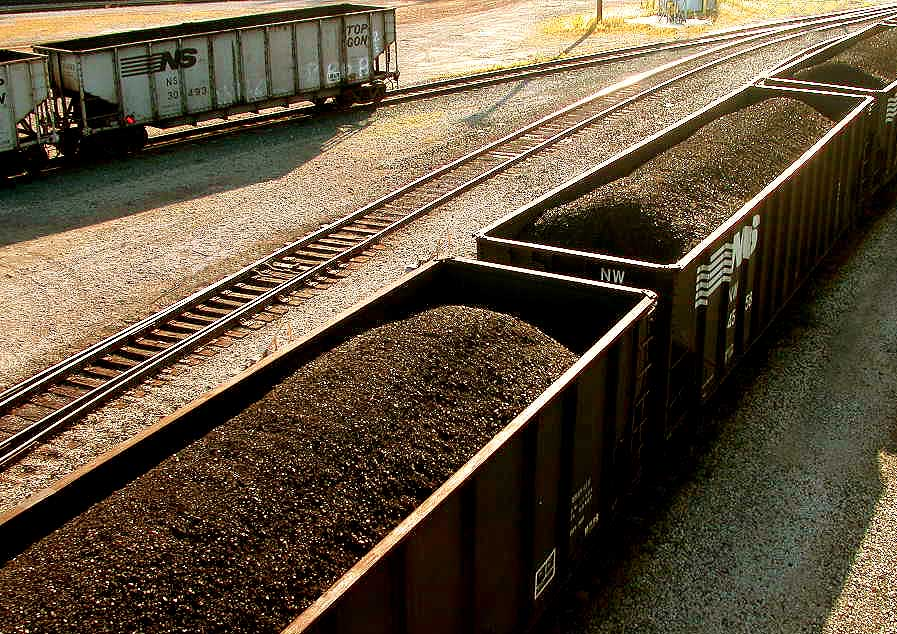
Train carrying mined coal through Ashtabula. Ohio has an estimated 11 billion short tons of recoverable coal resources.

Ohio is ranked #7 in the country in overall coal reserves, with 23 billion short tons, 11 billion of which is recoverable. In 2008, the state mined 26 million short tons of coal, ranking #11 in the country in production.

The Baard Project, to be located in Wellsville and led by Washington-based Baard Energy, in October 2010 announced it will begin construction on a facility to liquify coal into jet and diesel fuel after receiving $2.5 billion for the first phase of the $6 billion project.

The state has also become a target for a similar synthetic oil operation by Pennsylvania-based CoalStar Industries.

== Renewable ==
Ohio is part of the emerging "Green Belt" in the United States, as companies flock to the industrial Midwest and Northeast to take advantage of the proximity to the infrastructure, resources, and skilled labor available. Through 2007, Ohio ranked #4 in the country for green economic growth, according to the Pew Charitable Trust. In 2008, Site Selection magazine ranked Ohio #1 in the nation in alternative energy manufacturing, with 135 projects. In 2006, renewable energy revenues in Ohio were $775 million, creating 6,615 jobs.

In 2008, the Ohio legislature unanimously passed, and Governor Ted Strickland signed into law, Senate Bill 221 requiring 12.5% of Ohio's energy be generated from renewable sources by 2025. This built on initiatives from the previous administration of Bob Taft, who led with an "Energy Action Plan" and placed mandates on ethanol and renewable energy use for the state government, while providing incentives for production and consumption to the private market. However, in 2019, Republicans passed Ohio House Bill 6 which reduced the renewable portfolio standard to 8.5% by 2026. Electric utility company FirstEnergy bribed Speaker of the Ohio House of Representatives Larry Householder with $60 million in support for Republican candidates in exchange for the bill, which also heavily subsidized coal-fired power plants and nuclear plants.

=== Solar ===
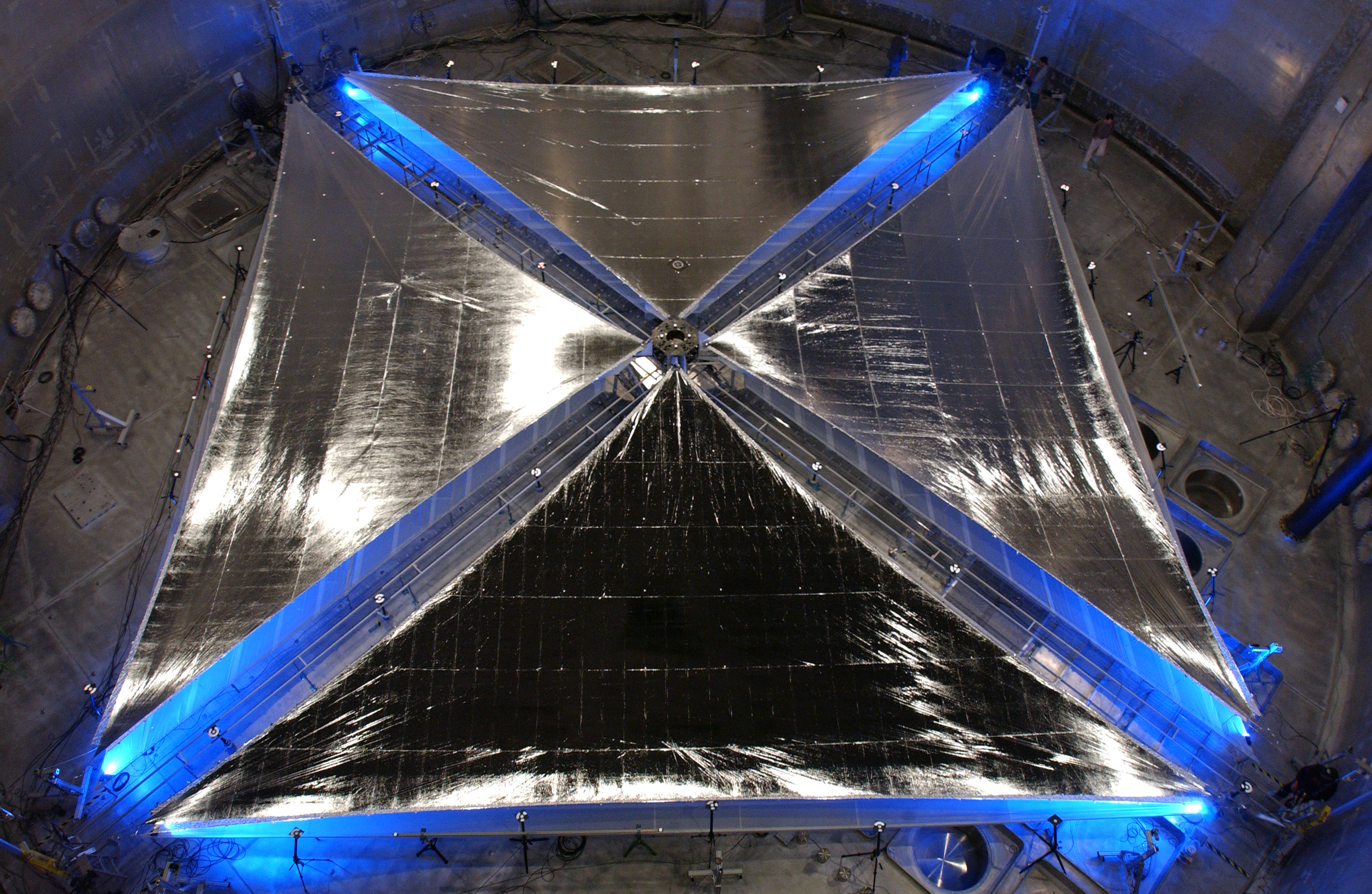
A fully deployed solar sail system at the NASA Glenn Research Center's Plum Brook Space Power Facility, the world's largest space environment simulation chamber, in Sandusky. The development of these sails has been critical for future robotic space exploration and the chamber will be featured in the upcoming motion picture "The Avengers".

Through 2010, Ohio was ranked #2 in solar manufacturing in the United States behind Oregon, employing 1088 among manufacturers and installers. Between 2007 and 2010, the state received nearly $750 million in solar investments.

The Toledo metro area is recognized nationally as a "seat of solar energy", nicknamed "Solar Valley". The area is home to large solar production facilities, including Willard and Kelsey Solar Group, which will begin production in 2011 on a 280,000-square-foot (26,000 m^{2}), $250 million facility. First Solar has manufacturing operations Perrysburg, which recently completed a $141 million expansion of current facilities. First Solar is the fourth largest manufacturer of solar PV panels in the world, and the largest manufacturer of thin film solar modules in the United States. Xunlight Corp. in headquartered Toledo, and Cal-YXO USA, a subsidiary of Germany-based Q-Cells AG, is located in the metro area. In 2010, Australia-based Dysesol and United Kingdom–based Pilkington North America announced a joint venture called DyeTec Solar, to be based in Toledo, specializing in the development of transparent conductive oxide glass for the solar industry.

There are 115 companies and research institutions involved in developing solar energy in the state. Other companies specializing in solar include DuPont, which is undertaking a $175 million expansion at their Circleville facility, Owens Corning, SolarGystics, Innovative Thin Films, Shadeplex, Buckeye Silicon, Maumee Authority Stamping, Advanced Distributed Generation, and Nextronex in Toledo, Melink Corporation in Cincinnati, which recently made Inc. 5000's list of fastest growing companies in the United States for the fourth year in a row; Third Sun Solar in Athens has been Inc. 5000 fast-growth listed three years running. Bold Alternatives in Cleveland, The Renaissance Group in Kirtland, Solar Grid in Cleveland Heights, SunFlower Solutions in Cleveland, Dovetail Solar and Wind in Glouster, Solar Creations in Mansfield, SunLight Energy Systems in North Lawrence, and Blue Chip Solar and Wind in Cincinnati and YellowLite Inc in Cleveland are other Ohio-based solar companies.

Youngstown-based Northern States Metals manufacturers the popular Solar FlexRack, which reduces installation time by 88%. Energy Focus, Inc., with its headquarters in Solon, is a major supplier of lighting solutions, including solar cells, whose work includes R&D and other projects for the Department of Energy, DARPA, and Naval Air Systems Command.

2010 saw Maryland-based Astrum Solar announcing the opening of offices in Youngstown, citing a growing demand in the region, while in October New Mexico–based Iosil Energy announced a $13.5 million pilot manufacturing operation in Columbus. Spain-based Prius Energy S.L. and Malaga Isofoton North America also announced construction plans for their North American manufacturing operations in the state later in the year.

In April 2011, Germany-based TecnoSun Solar announced it was locating its North American headquarters in Toledo, in collaboration with the University of Toledo.

==== Projects ====
Solar projects in Ohio in the 21st century have advanced including major and novel. American Electric Power is constructing the largest solar array east of the Rockies, and a Juwi Solar operation in the Toledo-area is one of the largest in the Midwest.

==== Solar Valley ====
In October 2010, the Third Frontier awarded a $3.5 million grant toward the Solar Valley Research Enterprise, a partnership between the University of Toledo, Dow Corning, First Solar, and Xunlight.

=== Fuel cell ===
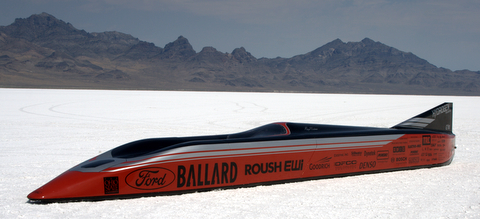
The 2007 version of the Buckeye Bullet 2 built by students of the Ohio State University in Columbus, the world's fastest fuel cell vehicle. It was built in collaboration with Monaco-based Venturi Automobiles, which is locating their North American headquarters near the university.

Ohio is recognized internationally as a leader in fuel cell technology, nicknamed the "Fuel Cell Corridor" with over 800 companies in the industry supply chain. Since 2002, the state government has invested $88 million, along with $300 million in federal funding, in research and development. In 2006, revenues for the industry in the state totalled $80 million, creating 1,030 jobs. By 2009, the state was among the top five in the nation in the industry, while the Ohio Fuel Cell Association was the largest by membership in the country. Catacel, headquartered in Garrettsville, reported a 72% revenue growth between 2008 and 2009. The state is home to over 60,000 specialized employees for the industry with an average salary of $68,000 annually.

Over 100 companies focused on fuel-cell production dot the state. Notables include Rolls-Royce Fuel Cell Systems, headquartered in Canton, NexTech Materials located in Columbus, which produces the SenseH2 Hydrogen Sensor; Graftech's global headquarters in Parma, American Hydrogen Corporation in Athens, Texaco Ovonic Battery Systems in Springboro, HydroGen Corporation, headquartered in Cleveland, Pemery Corporation in Brecksville, Pacific Fuel Cell Company, which has a manufacturing operation in Willoughby; Hawk Corporation, headquartered in Cleveland and sold in October 2010 to Carlisle Companies for $413 million, and Catacel is located in Garrettsville.

The Chevrolet Cruze is manufactured at Lordstown Assembly. AMP Holdings of Blue Ash specializes in lithium battery-based fuel cell technology, including systems developed for the 2010 Chevrolet Equinox, the Saturn Sky, and the Pontiac Solstice. In 2010 they signed a contract to deliver 1000 vehicles to Iceland-based Northern Lights Energy.

California-based CODA in 2010 announced plans for a $657 million electric fuel-cell manufacturing operation to be based in Columbus, led by Lio Energy Systems, a joint venture with China-based Linshen Power Battery. In September 2010, the city of Columbus extended $32.6 million in incentives to the project, complementing requested federal loans as well as $100 million in tax incentives extended by the state in May. In October 2010, the Third Frontier extended a $2 million grant to the project.

In October 2010, New Jersey–based BASF Corporation, a subsidiary of Germany-based BASF, broke ground on a $50 million lithium-ion battery materials production facility in Elyria, the most advanced in North America. In November 2010, SB LiMotive, a joint venture between Germany-based Bosch and Korea-based Samsung, announced it would assemble high-tech batteries for the Fiat 500EV at their Springboro facility.

In January 2011, Venturi Automobiles announced plans to locate their North American headquarters near the campus of the Ohio State University in Columbus.

=== Research and development ===
The Battelle Memorial Institute is involved in research and development of the industry. Cleveland is home to the Wright Fuel Cell Center. NASA Glenn Research Center in Cleveland leads the nation's research and development of fuel cell technology for Space exploration.

In September 2010, the Fuel Cell Prototyping Center at Stark State College of Technology was awarded a $1.7 million research contract from the U.S. Department of Defense to develop a solid oxide fuel cell in collaboration with Lockheed-Martin and Technology Management, aimed at defense energy independence from oil.

Nanotek Instruments in Dayton developed a coin-size ultracapacitor cell from graphene as an alternative to traditional commercial batteries in December 2010.

=== Projects and awards ===
In 2010, Canada-based Ballard Power Systems, in collaboration with FirstEnergy of Ohio, shipped their CLEARgen generator, the world's largest fuel cell, to Eastlake for a trial powering 500 homes over 5 years.

Later that year, Maumee-based Dana Holding Corporation won the Gold Award for its advancements in polymer electrolyte fuel cells, the top honor at the 10th Annual Fuel Cell Congress held in Stuttgart, Germany.

In 2010, the Ohio State University student-built Buckeye Bullet 2, a fuel cell vehicle built in collaboration with Monaco-based Venturi Automobiles and equipped with a Ballard fuel cell, set a FIA world speed record for electric vehicles in reaching 307.7 mph (495.2 km/h), eclipsing the previous record of 245.5 mph (395.1 km/h). The vehicle had reached speeds of 314.9 mph (506.8 km/h) in 2004, but failed FIA safety requirements.

=== Wind ===
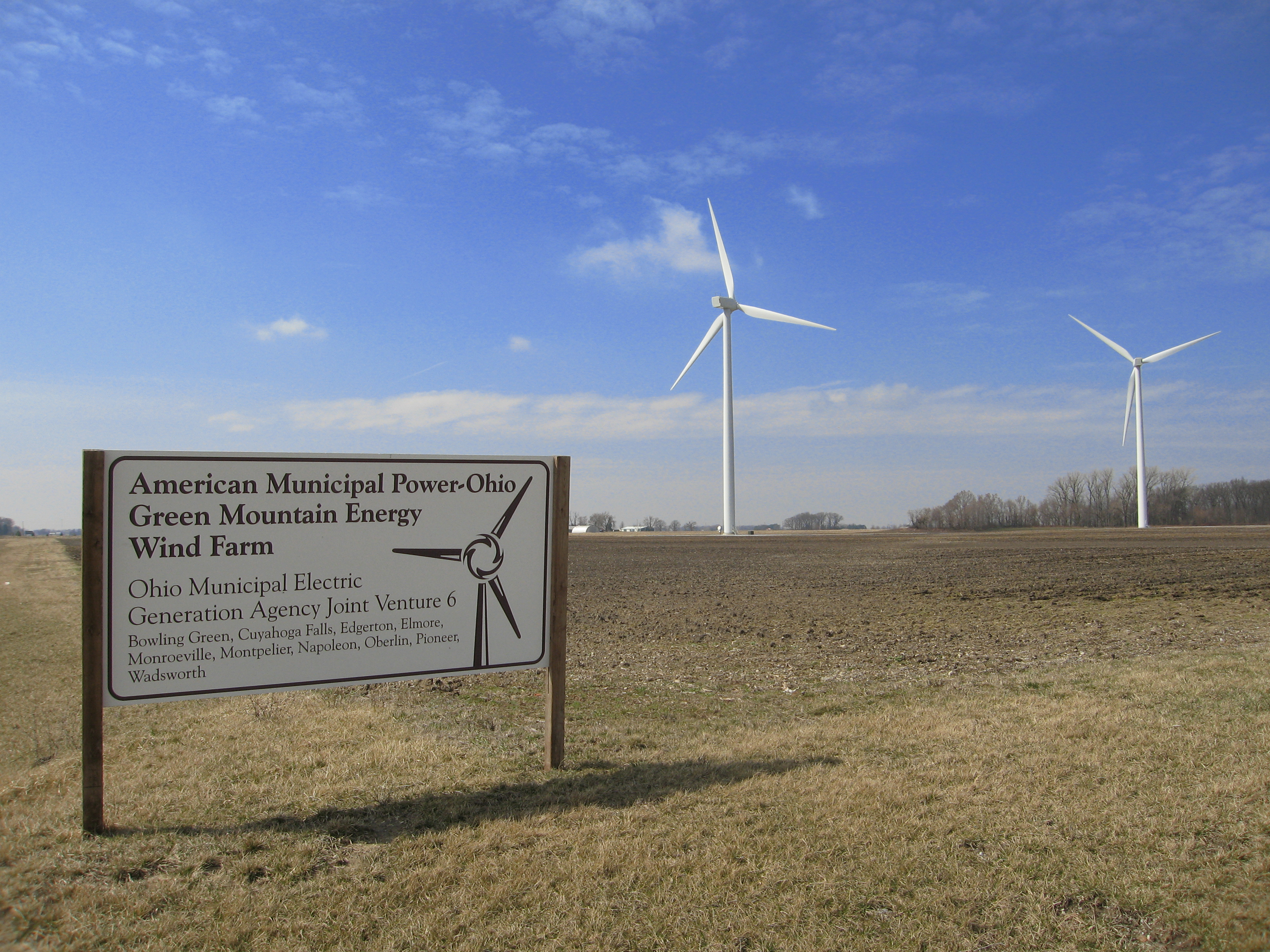
Wind farm in Bowling Green, the pioneer of the state in developing commercial wind energy.

As of 2010, Ohio has 532 companies in the wind energy supply chain and trails only California in industrial potential. As of 2009 the state was #27 in wind energy production. In 2006, revenues from wind energy production totaled $250 million, creating 1,700 jobs. Through 2011, an estimated 7500 employment positions were estimated to be wind-related. During the second half of 2011, Ohio ranked #5 in the nation in new wind energy production at 56.6 MW.

Companies specializing or involved in wind infrastructure production and retail include Twenty First Century Energy LLC, which recently received $1.2 million federal grant to develop turbines for the military, Jetstream Power International in Holmesville, Four Seasons Windpower in Medina, Ohio Windmill Manufacturing Company in Berlin Center, North Coast Wind and Power in Port Clinton, Cardinal Fastener & Specialty Co., Inc. in Bedford Heights, Ashland Inc. in Dublin, American Tower Company in Shelby, Ohio, Canton Drop Forge in Canton, Green Energy Technologies in Akron, Michael Byrne Mfg. Co. Inc. in Akron, Molded Fiber Glass Companies in Ashtabula, Caldwell Energy Options in Wooster, O'Brock Windmill Distributors in North Benton, Presto Wind Products in Cincinnati, National Electric Coil in Columbus, Parker Hannifin in Cleveland, Swiger Coil Systems in Cleveland, WebCore Technologies in Miami Township and Vanner Inc. in Hilliard. Red Hawk Systems manufactures wind energy components, as well as photovoltaic systems for solar energy, and fuel cell systems for automobiles. Akron-based Timken has invested $200 million for retooling their operations to meet the energy sector demand.

In 2009, Lorain County Community College became the first higher-education institution in the state to offer an associate degree in wind turbine power generation, in which almost five dozen students immediately enrolled.

In 2011, The Timken Company announced it would construct the first large wind-turbine gearbox system research and development center, an $11.8 million project to be located in Canton.

==== Projects ====
In 1998, the city of Bowling Green began studying the feasibility of wind energy, and eventually became the first municipality in the state to construct wind turbines for commercial use, a $9.2 million project resulting in the reduction of kilowatt per hour cost from $.10 to $.025-.035. The northwest region is recognized as the pioneer for the state in wind energy.

Ohio has enormous wind energy potential in Lake Erie and in the western portion of the state. Numerous wind energy projects have popped up, ready to produce thousands of megawatts of power. They include Legacy Renewable Energy Development's proposed $120 million tri-county project near Lake Erie, the Buckeye Wind Project in Champaign County, and the Northwest Ohio Wind Energy project in Grover Hill.

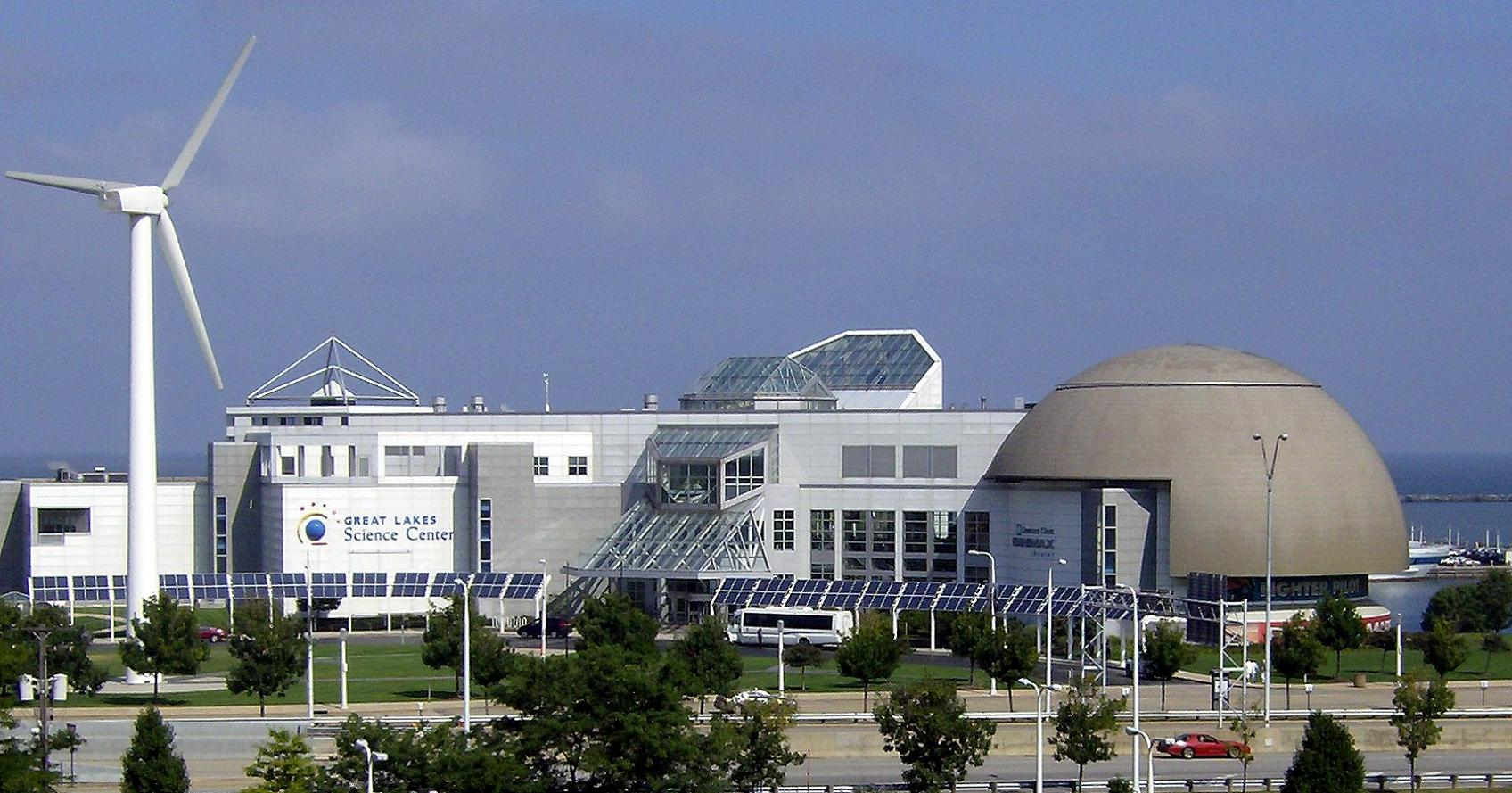
Wind turbine at the Great Lakes Science Center in Cleveland.

In June 2010, General Electric, in cooperation with the Lake Erie Energy Development Corporation, announced the first freshwater-offshore wind turbine initiative in North America, a $100 million pilot project. The project will also include California-based Bechtel.

In August 2010, 400 MW from 191 turbines was approved for construction at the Blue Creek Wind Farm and Timber Road Wind Farm. The Wind Energy Research and Development Center at Stark State College of Technology was announced later that year, with $8 million in investment from the Third Frontier, Timken, and the college.

In October 2010, Germany-based Siemens signed a letter of intent with the Lake Erie Alternative Power group for a $13 billion off-shore wind energy project, projected to create 30,000 jobs in the tri-state region of Ohio, New York, and Pennsylvania. Also that month Iowa-based MidAmerican Energy and American Electric Power announced their 11-state "Smartransmission" power line project to transmit generated wind energy would cost $20 billion and could be finished by next decade.

=== Biofuels ===
==== Ethanol ====
Ethanol is a biofuel leader in the state, with $700 million in annual sales. 146 million bushels of corn from the state are purchased yearly to produce it. The state has five production facilities, including POET facilities Marion, Leipsic, and Fostoria; a Marathon facility in Greenville, and a Valero facility.

==== Biomass ====
The state is #7 in the nation in biomass potential, with over 7 million dry tons produced.

Anaerobic digestion companies in the state include French Creek BioEnergy in Sheffield Village, Forest City Land Development in Cleveland, Haviland Co. in Haviland, Ohio, Hord Livestock, Inc. in Bucyrus, Comp Dairy Energy in Dorset Township, Lime Lake Energy in Norton, Northwest BioEnergy in Toledo, Sidco-Development in St. Clairsville, Wooster Renewable Energy in Wooster, and Zanesville Energy in Zanesville.

Columbus-based American Electric Power announced in 2010 it would begin supplying generating stations in the state with a biodiesel blended with red-dyed No. 2 fuel oil to undergo evaluations in complying with the alternative energy standards of the state.

Phycal, an algae energy company based in Highland Heights with research facilities and pilot projects in Hawaii, recently announced another $9 million pilot project to be located in Hoover, Alabama, producing algae for commercial fuel purposes. Maumee-based Red Lion Bio-Energy operates a synthesis biogas production plant with the University of Toledo.

In December 2010, Wisconsin-based Greenwood Fuels announced the construction of a $9 million, 150,000 ton-per year manufacturing facility for alternative fuels.

==== Research and development ====
The Edison Materials Technology Center in Kettering has received a $2 million federal grant to develop biofuel from algae for the military. In 2010, the University of Toledo and Ohio University were selected to lead Center for Algal Engineering Research and Commercialization project, funded by the Third Frontier, which will focus on the emerging algae biofuel industry.

A Marysville-based subsidiary of Univenture developed a cost-effective technique for producing algae and has garnered global attention for their breakthrough technology, including a $6 million grant from the U.S. Department of Energy. Featured on Austrian state television in November 2010, the company announced a $9 million expansion project in December. Arisdyne Systems, based in Cleveland, develops new technologies for the industry. NASA's Glenn Research Center in Cleveland has invested in microalgae research for potential jet fuel.

Jerome Township–based Velocys has developed microchannel technology for producing cellulosic diesel, which has demonstration commitments in Austria, Brazil, and at Wright-Patterson in Dayton. Quasar Energy Group develops biofuel producing technologies and is headquartered in Wooster.

In 2010, the Ohio State University won the U.S. Department of Energy's EcoCar competition. Ohio University inventor Dr. Geradine Botte in 2010 unveiled a new firm, Athens-based E3 Technologies, to develop her "Green Box" invention. The "Green Box" converts wastewaster to hydrogen energy.

Oberlin-based Switzer Performance recently built a Nissan GTR, called the E900, that runs on ethanol, with 900 horsepower (670 kW) and acceleration that can reach 60-130 mph in six seconds. In September 2010, Oxford Resource Partners of Columbus and Mendel Biotechnology of California announced a pilot project to test reclaimed mining land in eastern Ohio for production of bioenergy crops.

=== Geothermal ===
Professor Carl Nielsen of Ohio State University invented the first ground source heat pump heating system in 1948 in Columbus. In 2006, revenue created from geothermal totalled $112 million, creating 1,270 jobs. The largest family-owned geothermal drilling company and one of the largest companies for such in the United States, Jackson Geothermal, is headquartered in Mansfield.

=== Hydroelectric ===
Columbus is home to a national leader in hydroelectric power development, American Municipal Power, Inc. They currently have five plants under development along the Ohio River, including the 84 MW Cannelton project, 105 MW Meldhahl project, 48 MW Robert C. Bird project, 72 MW Smithland project, and 35 MW Willow Island project. They also operate the existing Belleville Hydroelectric Plant. Other notable hydroelectric plants and operations include Stockport Mill Country Inn and the O'Shaughnessy Dam.

== Nuclear ==
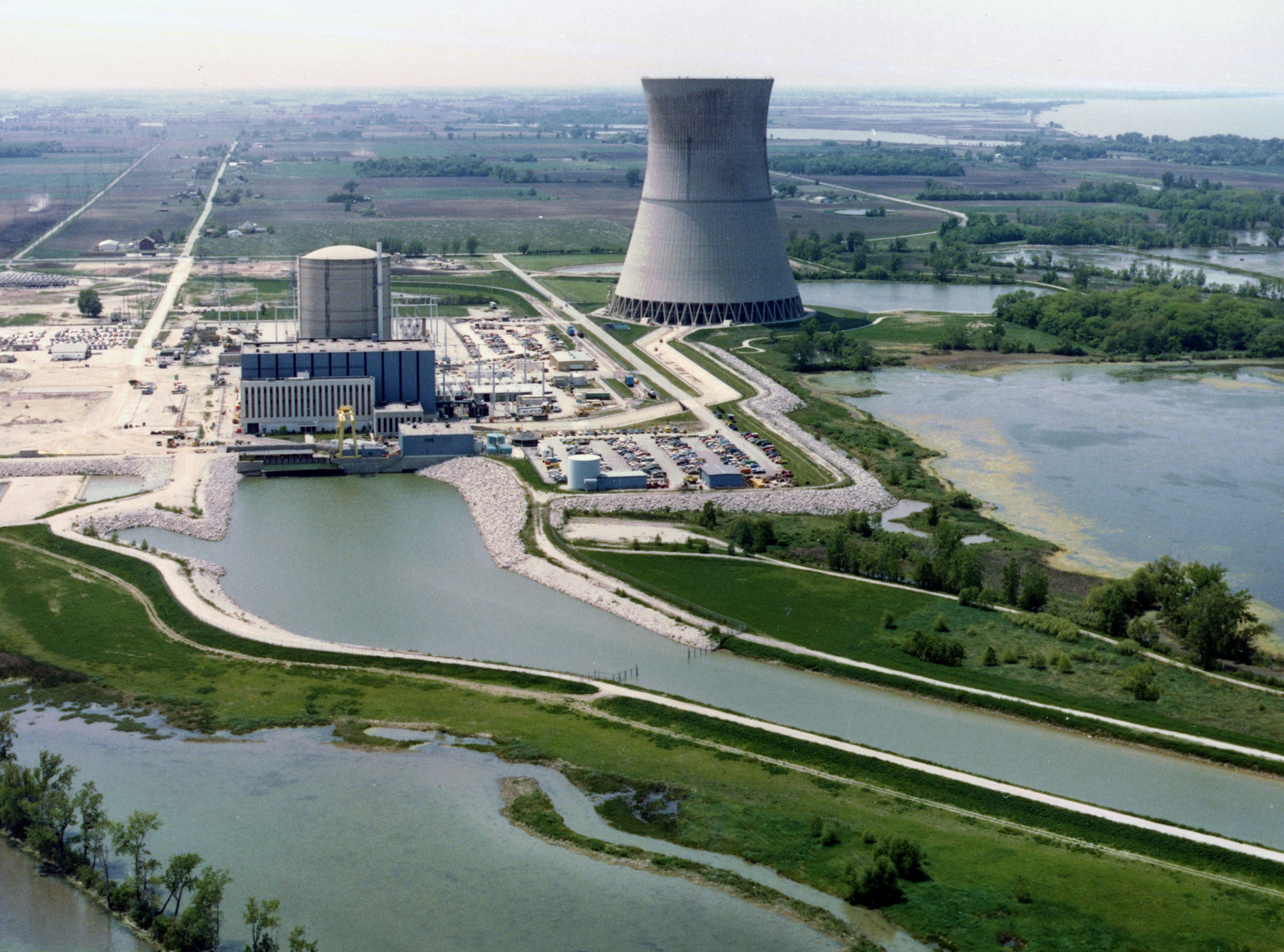
Davis–Besse nuclear power plant located in Oak Harbor on Lake Erie

Ohio is home to two nuclear power plants, the Davis–Besse Nuclear Power Station and Perry Nuclear Generating Station. A third is planned for construction in Piketon, at a cost of $10 billion and with promise of 3000 construction jobs. The project is being led by Duke Energy.

Piketon is already home to the Portsmouth Gaseous Diffusion Plant, a former uranium enrichment plant built in 1954 and used for energy and weaponry purposes. It ceased in 2001 to perform its main functions, but carried on with relatively small tasks, until the United States Enrichment Corporation, which owns the facility, constructed the American Centrifuge Demonstration Facility at the site. Construction also has begun on the American Centrifuge Plant, which was expected to reach commercial capacity in 2010, but because of lack of funding, has been relegated to research tasks.

France-based Areva began operational testing of their new facility in Portsmouth, called the DUF_{6} project, in 2010, which will convert 700,000 metric tons of depleted uranium hexafluoride into uranium oxide. It became fully operational later that year in September.

Ohio has an above average concentration of uranium in southern Ohio, as well as in the Ohio shale located in the western and central part of the state.

== Modern environment movement ==
Ohio historically has suffered environmental damage from its industrial and energy base. It has been ranked last in addressing environmental issues and alternative energy consumption and 47th in carbon footprint.

The modern American environmental movement concerning legislation and awareness, including the U.S. Environmental Protection Agency and Clean Water Act, can largely be traced back to the Cuyahoga River fire of June 22, 1969. One of the leading causes of the fire was oil discharged into the river by nearby refineries. The fire also inspired the Randy Newman song "Burn On".
