= Solar power in Ohio =

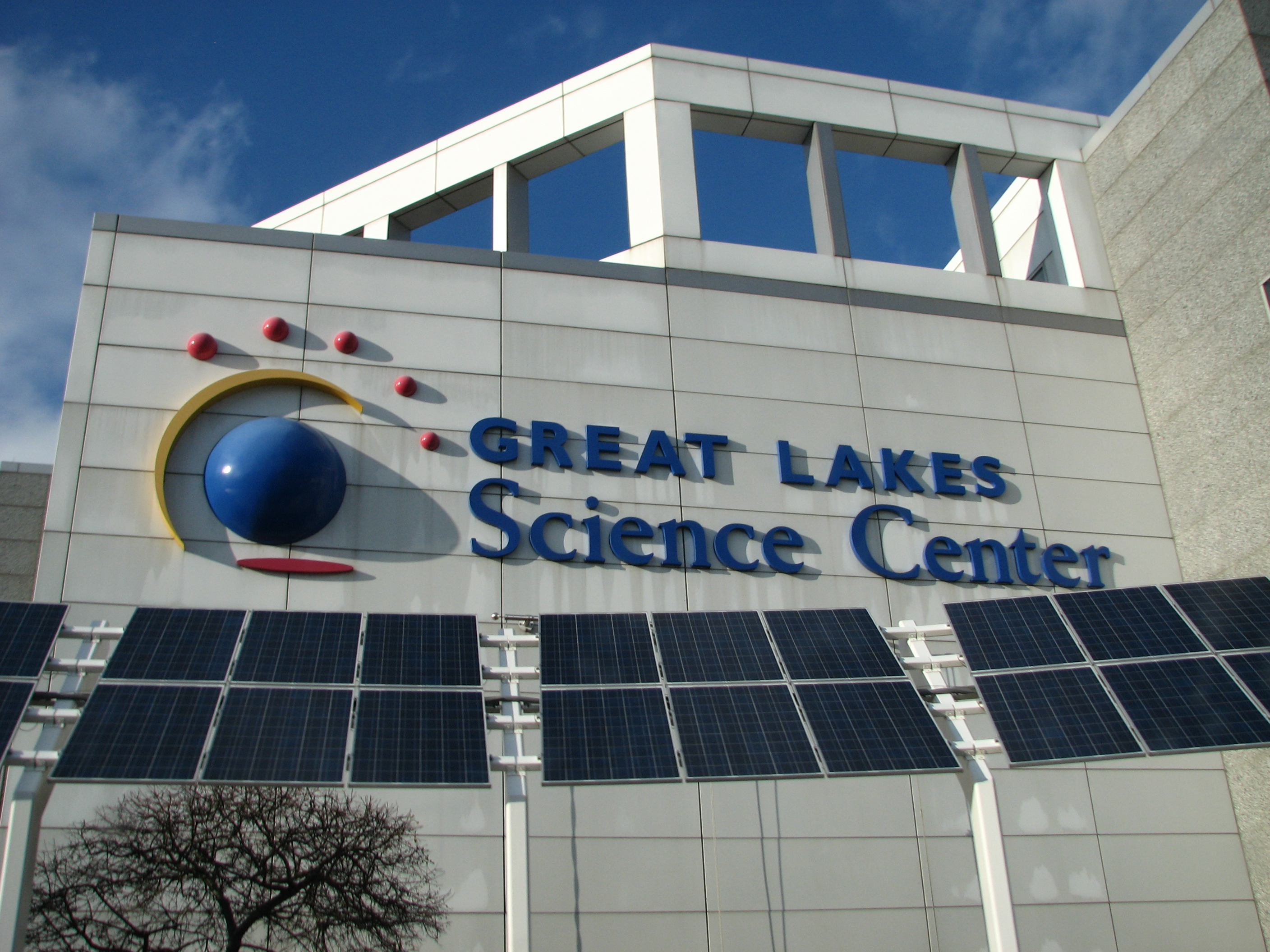
Solar panels in Cleveland

Solar power in Ohio has been increasing, as the cost of photovoltaics has decreased. Ohio installed 10 MW of solar in 2015. Ohio adopted a net metering rule which allows any customer generating up to 25 kW to use net metering, with the kilowatt hour surplus rolled over each month, and paid by the utility once a year at the generation rate upon request. For hospitals there is no limit on size, but two meters are required, one for generation, the other for utility supplied power. As of March 2026, Ohio's installed solar passed 6,330 MW, marking a significant surge in solar capacity. Solar now produces 5.75% of the state's overall power generation.

In 2010, the 12 MW solar farm in Upper Sandusky was the largest solar farm in the state. It was surpassed by the 20MW DG AMP Solar Bowling Green farm, which was completed in January 2017. In December 2024, Fox Squirrel Solar came online in Madison County, generating 577 MWs and becoming the largest solar operation in the state. In 2025, construction began on Oak Run Solar Farm. This project will deliver up to 800 MWs in the coming years. It will also feature a 300 MW battery energy storage facility in Madison County. The Oak Run Solar project plans to implement an agrivoltaic program for grazing and crops. This will be the nation's largest and first of its kind utility scale solar energy plan for livestock and animal grazing. The Oak Run Solar Project will occupy approximately 4,400 acres.

The First Solar factory in Perrysburg can produce almost 600 MW of panels per year.

Costs have decreased to the point that the average consumer may save approximately $17,527 over a 20-year period by installing solar panels. Euclid's City Hall and library installed solar panels which are expected to save $25,000 over the next 15 years. The panels were installed at no cost to the city by Ohio Cooperative Solar, which is leasing the rooftops.

== Solar projects ==
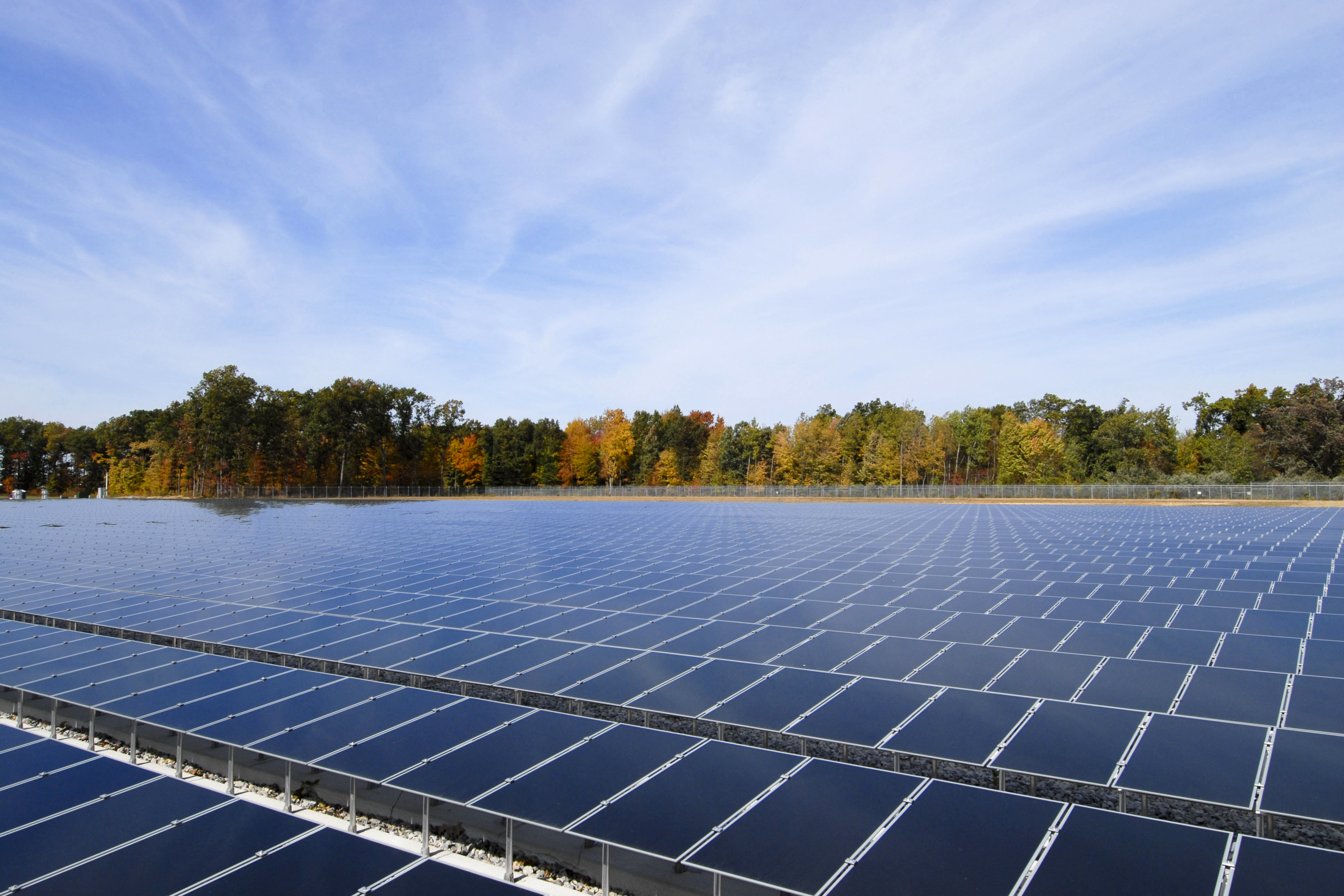
Solar panels, Toledo Air National Guard Base, Swanton

Overall capacity of Ohio's utility-scale solar projects was estimated at 100 MW in December 2020, with an additional 400 MW projected to come online within the next year.

=== Toledo area ===
In 2009, ground broke on what was then one of the largest solar fields in the United States, located in Wyandot County, near Upper Sandusky. The 12-MW plant, finished in September 2010, was constructed by Germany-based Juwi Solar, and is called Wyandot Solar LLC., leasing its energy to AEP.

A 1.1 MW solar field was constructed by Advanced Distributed Generation on the University of Toledo campus.

The airbase for 180th Fighter Wing of the Ohio Air National Guard in Toledo has a 1.2 MW solar installation.

In 2010, the Ohio Department of Transportation announced that Xunlight and First Solar would provide 100 kW of panels for a $1.5 million research project at the Veterans' Glass City Skyway in Toledo.

=== Dayton ===
In 2009, University of Dayton graduate Zachary Layman's company Solar Roadways received a $100,000 grant from the U.S. Department of Energy to develop his solar road prototype, which embeds solar panels into driving surfaces. It won General Electric's Ecomagination Challenge Award in 2010.

Another of the state's largest solar arrays was constructed by The Dayton Power and Light Company in Dayton. The solar field generates 1.1 Megawatts of power. The facility will consist of 9,000 solar panels constructed over 7 acres (28,000 m^{2}), and will generate enough electricity to power nearly 150 homes.

=== Columbus area ===
Central Ohio has seen a surge in the number of solar projects in recent years. The largest project approved and currently under construction is Oak Run Solar. Located in Madison County, this project will generate up to 800 MW of power. This is the largest solar project ever approved in the state's history. Currently, the largest operating solar project in the state is Fox Squirrel Run, which generates 577 MW of power.

=== Elsewhere ===
In September 2009, Third Sun Solar, in collaboration with the Akron Metro Regional Transit Authority and Sharp Solar Energy Solutions Group, installed the largest rooftop solar array in the state, comprising 2,076 solar modules producing 488 kW.

Cincinnati Zoo and Melink Corporation announced the opening of a new 1.56 MW solar canopy in 2011. The 6,400 solar panels, located in the zoo's Vine Street parking lot, provide 20% of the zoo's power needs.

In 2012, Campbell Soup Company built a 9.8 MW solar plant to provide energy for its operations in Napoleon.

== Renewable portfolio standard ==
HB6, which passed the state legislature in July 2019, phases out Ohio's renewable portfolio standard completely. A referendum petition has been started to overturn HB6. Ohio had a renewable portfolio standard which calls for 0.06% from solar by 2012, 0.09% by 2013, and 0.5% from solar and 12.5% from renewable sources by 2026. However, the standard was frozen in government in 2014 and no further increases were required. Ohio used 154,145 million kWh in 2010. Approximately 75 MW is required to generate 0.5% of the state's demand. Covering rooftops with solar panels in Ohio (46,800 MW) would generate 35.3% of demand.

== Statistics ==
Source: NREL

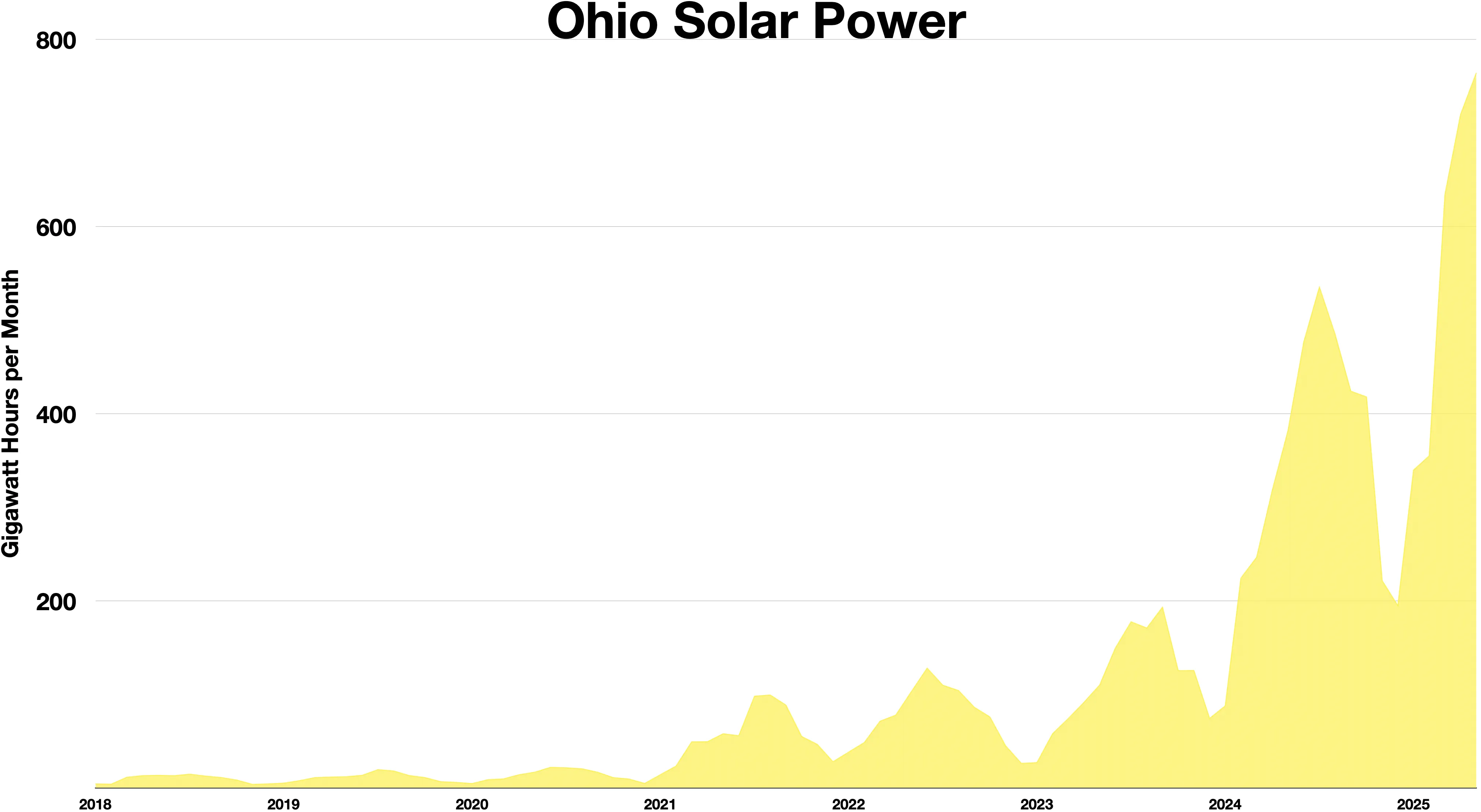
Ohio solar power

Ohio grid-connected PV capacity (MW)
Year	Capacity	Installed	% Change
2008	1.4	0.4	40%
2009	2.0	0.6	43%
2010	20.7	18.7	935%
2011	31.6	10.9	53%
2012	79.9	48.3	153%
2013	98.4	18.5	23%
2014	102	3	4%
2015	113	10	11%
2016	125	12	11%
2017	165	40	32%
2018	202.4	37.4	23%
2019	264.5	62.1	31%
2020	503.3	238.8	90%
2021	836.6	333.3	66.2%
2022	927	90.4	10.8%
2023	2821.9	1254.7	135.3%

Utility-scale solar generation in Ohio (GWh)
Year	Total	Jan	Feb	Mar	Apr	May	Jun	Jul	Aug	Sep	Oct	Nov	Dec
2010	13	0	0	0	1	2	2	2	2	2	1	1	0
2011	16	0	1	1	2	2	2	2	2	1	1	1	1
2012	37	1	1	2	3	4	5	4	4	4	4	3	2
2013	47	2	2	3	4	4	5	4	5	5	5	4	4
2014	53	2	2	4	4	5	6	6	6	6	5	4	3
2015	57	3	3	5	6	6	6	6	6	5	4	4	3
2016	64	2	5	4	5	6	6	7	7	7	6	5	4
2017	107	3	7	8	9	12	13	13	12	12	7	6	5
2018	120	5	4	12	14	14	14	15	13	12	9	4	4
2019	142	5	8	12	12	13	14	20	19	14	12	7	6
2020	164	5	9	10	14	17	23	22	21	17	11	10	5
2021	656	9	24	47	49	56	53	95	96	86	57	51	33
2022	858	43	53	74	82	104	125	109	103	88	78	47	30
2023	1315	30	54	71	86	106	148	175	166	179	116	114	70
2024	4027	87	244	247	318	382	477	537	486	424	419	217	189
2025	7885	341	357	637	730	788	897	952	1038	874	674	355	242
2026	7196	404	585	727	973	1088	1157	1238	1024				

== See also ==
- Wind power in Ohio
- Solar power in the United States
- Renewable energy in the United States
