= Blue Creek Wind Farm =

Wind farm in Ohio, USA

- Country: United States
- Coordinates: 40°55′33″N 84°33′43″W
- Status: Operational
- Construction began: September 2010
- Commission date: June 2012
- Construction cost: $600 million
- Owner: Iberdrola Renewables
- Operator: Avangrid Renewables

Wind farm
- Type: Onshore

Power generation
- Units operational: 152 turbines
- Make and model: Siemens Gamesa G90-2.0 MW
- Nameplate capacity: 304 MW
- Capacity factor: 29.9% (average 2013-2018)
- Annual net output: 797 GW·h

The Blue Creek Wind Farm spanning Paulding and Van Wert County became the largest wind farm in the U.S. state of Ohio at approximately 40,500 acres upon its completion in 2012. With a generating capacity of 304 megawatts (MW), it produces enough electricity to service the equivalent of about 76,000 homes. It was the largest private investment in the state in 2011, with the construction alone directly employing about 500 workers. The annual land lease payments, operations and maintenance employment, and property and income tax revenues provide an ongoing stimulus to the local rural economy.

== Electricity production ==
Blue Creek Wind Electricity Generation (MW·h)
Year	Total Annual MW·h
2011	29,303
2012	712,479
2013	821,816
2014	766,489
2015	809,329
2016	810,707
2017	829,176
2018	743,015
Average (years 2013–2018) →	796,755

== See also ==
- Wind power in Ohio
- Environmental impact of wind power
- List of wind farms in the United States
