= IGS Energy =

American independent retail natural gas and electric supplier

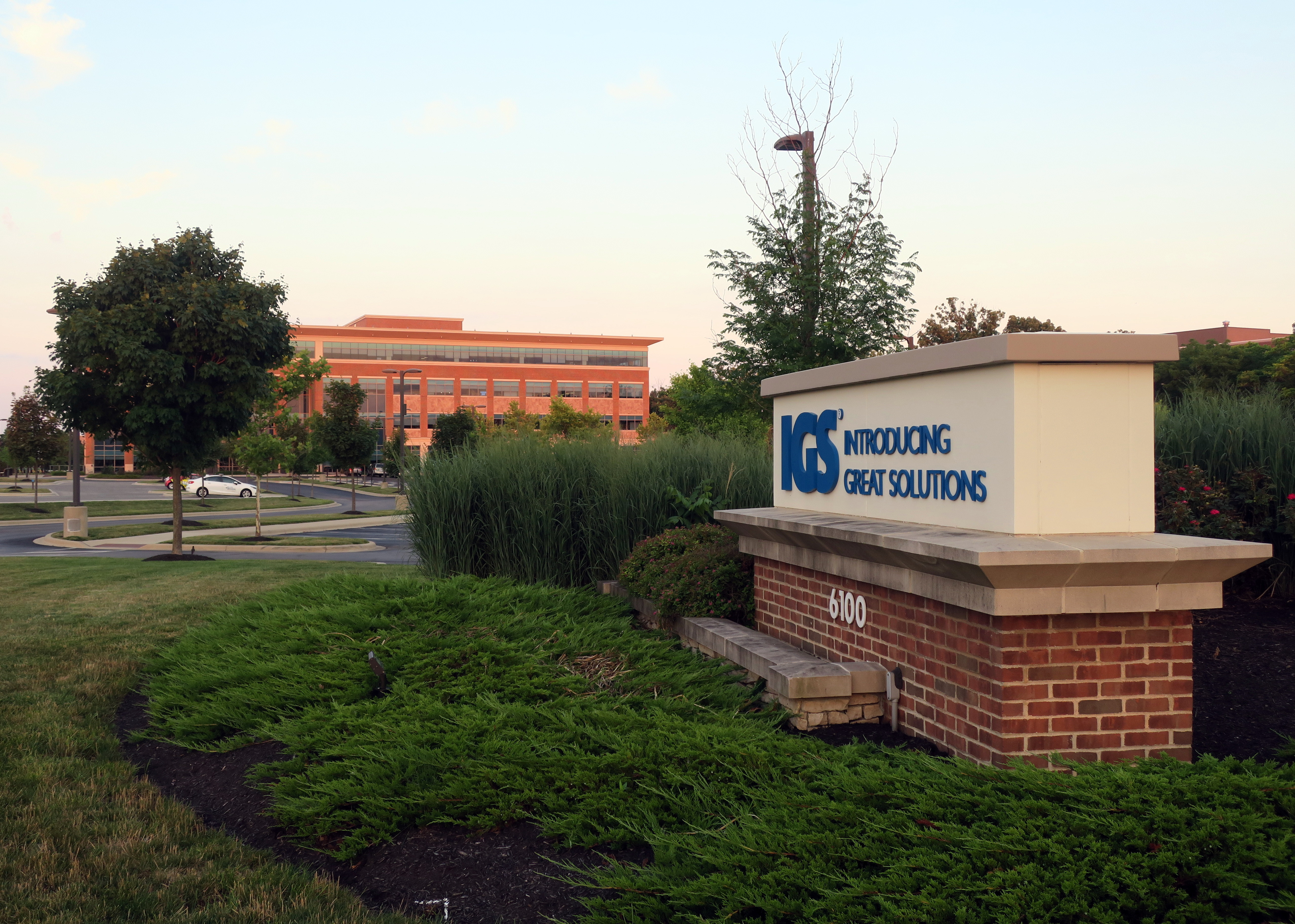
- IGS Energy headquarters (Dublin, Ohio)
- Type: Private
- Industry: Energy
- Founded: 1989
- Founder: Marvin White
- Headquarters: Dublin, Ohio, United States
- Products: Electrical Power Supply; Natural Gas Supply; CNG; Solar; Distributed Generation; Home Warranty
- Revenue: $2.5 billion (2021)
- Number of employees: 900+
- Website: www.igs.com

IGS Energy, also known as Interstate Gas Supply, Inc., is an independent retail natural gas and electric supplier based in Dublin, Ohio, United States. It serves more than 1,000,000 residential, commercial and industrial customers in the states of Ohio, Michigan, Kentucky, New York, Pennsylvania, Indiana, Virginia, Maryland, Texas, California, Illinois and Massachusetts. The company was founded in 1989, and today employs more than 900 people across 18 states.

== History ==
In 1986, Marvin White, former CEO of Columbia Gas Distribution Companies, helped found Ohio's choice program. Three years later, in 1989, he founded Interstate Gas Supply, Inc. (IGS Energy), in Dublin, Ohio, with his son, Scott. The privately held company began as a commercial and industrial wholesale supplier of Ohio-produced natural gas. By 1992, IGS Energy expanded its focus to include natural gas retail marketing directly to end-users. Following the deregulation of residential natural gas service in 1997, IGS Energy began serving residential customers of Columbia Gas of Ohio. IGS Energy further expanded into the residential and small commercial arenas in 1999. Today, as a natural gas provider, the company offers gas in Ohio, Michigan, Kentucky, New York, California, Pennsylvania, Indiana, Virginia and Illinois and has plans to expand further. In 2011, IGS acquired gas and electricity supplier Accent Energy, based in Dublin, Ohio, and its subsidiary Dynowatt. At the same year IGS Energy began providing electric service to customers in Chicago and Pennsylvania.

In 2010, IGS moved into its current headquarters in Dublin, Ohio. The IGS Energy building was awarded LEED® Platinum certification, the highest of the four LEED certification ratings, the first commercial office building in central Ohio to meet the LEED Platinum standard.

IGS continues to explore ways to bring energy to consumers in environmentally responsible ways. This includes offering green energy products, expanding solar energy offerings, compressed natural gas filling stations and distributed generation.

In July 2022, IGS acquired Dominion Energy Solutions.

== Natural Gas and Electric Residential Choice Programs ==
IGS Energy participates in Natural Gas Choice and provides electric service to residential customers. In February 2012 IGS Energy began serving electric customers in Ohio.

COMMODITY IGS Energy entered resi commodity sales in 2009 with a third party going door to door. In 2013 after many complaints and issues with the third party IGS Energy launched its own home energy consultant channel headed up by Rob Hamm. Since 2013 IGS commodity has hired over 350+ field agents that oversee commodity sales in the Illinois, Ohio, Pennsylvania, and Northern Kentucky markets.

== CNG stations ==
In January 2013, IGS Energy CNG Services announced plans to invest $10 million to construct four compressed natural gas refueling stations off Interstate 79 in West Virginia and Pennsylvania. Construction of the I-79 CNG corridor was scheduled for completion by the end of 2013. In June 2013 IGS Energy announced plans to construct another CNG station in Youngstown, Ohio.

IGS owns, operates or maintains 20 CNG stations across Ohio, Indiana, West Virginia, Pennsylvania and Wisconsin.

== IGS Solar ==
In 2015, IGS began offering solar services for businesses, communities and residential homes under the IGS Solar brand.

COMMUNITY SOLAR IGS Community Solar was launched in October 2021, now out of pilot phase and officially live in four markets as of July 2023. Chicago, Maryland, Pennsylvania, and New York. Community solar is run and operated by South Ohio regional manager Jeff Howe.

Most recently in February 2023 IGS Solar rolled out its residential rooftop solar program which is currently operating in the Chicago and Pennsylvania markets.

== IGS Lighting Solutions ==
In 2018, IGS began offering LED lighting to commercial customers.

== Green Energy ==
In 2020, IGS Energy began offering "100% green electricity" and carbon-neutral Natural Gas to all new residential customers.
