= Solar power in Georgia =

Solar power in Georgia may refer to"

- Solar power in Georgia (country)
- Solar power in Georgia (U.S. state)
