= Conley, Georgia =

Conley
- Unincorporated community Census-designated place
- Location in Clayton County and the state of Georgia
- Coordinates: 33°38′25″N 84°20′32″W
- Country: United States
- State: Georgia
- County: Clayton, Fulton

Area
  - Total: 1.94 sq mi (5.03 km^{2})
  - Land: 1.92 sq mi (4.98 km^{2})
  - Water: 0.019 sq mi (0.05 km^{2})
- Elevation: 850 ft (260 m)

Population (2020)
  - Total: 6,680
  - Density: 3,475.4/sq mi (1,341.87/km^{2})
- Time zone: UTC-5 (Eastern (EST))
  - Summer (DST): UTC-4 (EDT)
- ZIP code: 30288-30354
- Area code: 404
- FIPS code: 13-19280
- GNIS feature ID: 0331447

Conley is an unincorporated community and census-designated place (CDP) in Clayton County and DeKalb County, Georgia, United States. As of 2020 the CDP is entirely in Clayton County. It is at Atlanta's southeast corner, 7.98 miles from downtown. The population was 6,680 at the 2020 census. It is part of the Atlanta metropolitan area.

== History ==
Originally known as Moccasin Gap, the unincorporated community was officially named "Conley" in 1867 after the family who owned the land. The community was home to many farms, however now it is known for its manufacturing industry.

== Geography ==
Conley is located along the northern border of Clayton County at 33°38′25″N 84°20′32″W (33.640142, -84.342255). It is bordered by the city of Forest Park to the south and west, the city of Atlanta to the northwest, and by unincorporated land in DeKalb County to the north. The eastern edge of the CDP is formed by U.S. Route 23 (Moreland Avenue). Fort Gillem is to the south in Forest Park.

According to the United States Census Bureau, the Conley CDP has a total area of 1.9 square miles (5.0 km^{2}), of which 0.019 square miles (0.05 km^{2}), or 0.98%, is water.

== Demographics ==
Historical population
Census	Pop.	Note	%±
1980	6,033		—
1990	5,528		−8.4%
2000	6,188		11.9%
2010	6,228		0.6%
2020	6,680		7.3%
U.S. Decennial Census; 1850-1870 1870-1880; 1890-1910 1920-1930; 1940 1950 1960; 1970 1980 1990; 2000 2010 2020

Conley was first listed as a census-designated place in the 1980 U.S. census.

=== Racial and ethnic composition ===
Conley, Georgia – Racial and ethnic composition Note: the US Census treats Hispanic/Latino as an ethnic category. This table excludes Latinos from the racial categories and assigns them to a separate category. Hispanics/Latinos may be of any race.
Race / Ethnicity (NH = Non-Hispanic)	Pop 2000	Pop 2010	Pop 2020	% 2000	% 2010	% 2020
White alone (NH)	1,926	888	583	31.12%	14.26%	8.73%
Black or African American alone (NH)	3,251	3,556	4,067	52.54%	57.10%	60.88%
Native American or Alaska Native alone (NH)	8	7	21	0.13%	0.11%	0.31%
Asian alone (NH)	289	200	162	4.67%	3.21%	2.43%
Native Hawaiian or Pacific Islander alone (NH)	3	2	1	0.05%	0.03%	0.01%
Other race alone (NH)	2	11	35	0.03%	0.18%	0.52%
Mixed race or Multiracial (NH)	62	83	146	1.00%	1.33%	2.19%
Hispanic or Latino (any race)	647	1,481	1,665	10.46%	23.78%	24.93%
Total	6,188	6,228	6,680	100.00%	100.00%	100.00%

=== 2020 census ===
As of the 2020 census, Conley had a population of 6,680.

The median age was 34.1 years. 27.7% of residents were under the age of 18 and 10.7% were 65 years of age or older. For every 100 females there were 92.8 males, and for every 100 females age 18 and over there were 88.5 males age 18 and over.

100.0% of residents lived in urban areas, while 0.0% lived in rural areas.

There were 2,244 households and 1,266 families in Conley, and 39.9% of households had children under the age of 18 living in them. Of all households, 29.3% were married-couple households, 22.6% were households with a male householder and no spouse or partner present, and 40.0% were households with a female householder and no spouse or partner present. About 24.1% of all households were made up of individuals and 7.0% had someone living alone who was 65 years of age or older.

There were 2,397 housing units, of which 6.4% were vacant. The homeowner vacancy rate was 1.6% and the rental vacancy rate was 6.0%.

== Economy ==
A large number of trucking companies operate facilities in Conley, including less-than-truckload carriers, parts suppliers, and mechanics. Companies with terminals or other facilities in or near Conley include Old Dominion Freight Line, R+L Carriers, FedEx Freight, Saia, ABF Freight System, XTRA Lease, Estes Express Lines, Schneider National, Southeastern Freight Lines, Roehl Transport, Star Leasing, B.A.H. Express, C.R. England, CRST International, Tennessee Commercial Warehouse, Salson Logistics, Arka Express, and Central Freight Lines. The majority of these trucking companies are located along US 23/GA 42.

Global shipping and logistics company Crowley Maritime operates an intermodal container shipping and storage yard in Conley.

The Hickory Ridge Landfill is located in Conley. The capped landfill is now a solar energy project.

== Education ==
Areas in Clayton County are in the Clayton County Public Schools district.

The Clayton district operates Jewell C. Anderson Elementary School in Conley. School zoning is as follows: Eastern areas of Conley are zoned to Anderson Elementary. Western areas are zoned to Edmonds Elementary and Huie Elementary, both in Forest Park.

Conley is zoned to Forest Park Middle School and Forest Park High School.
