= Solar power in Georgia (U.S. state) =

Overview of solar power in the U.S. state of Georgia

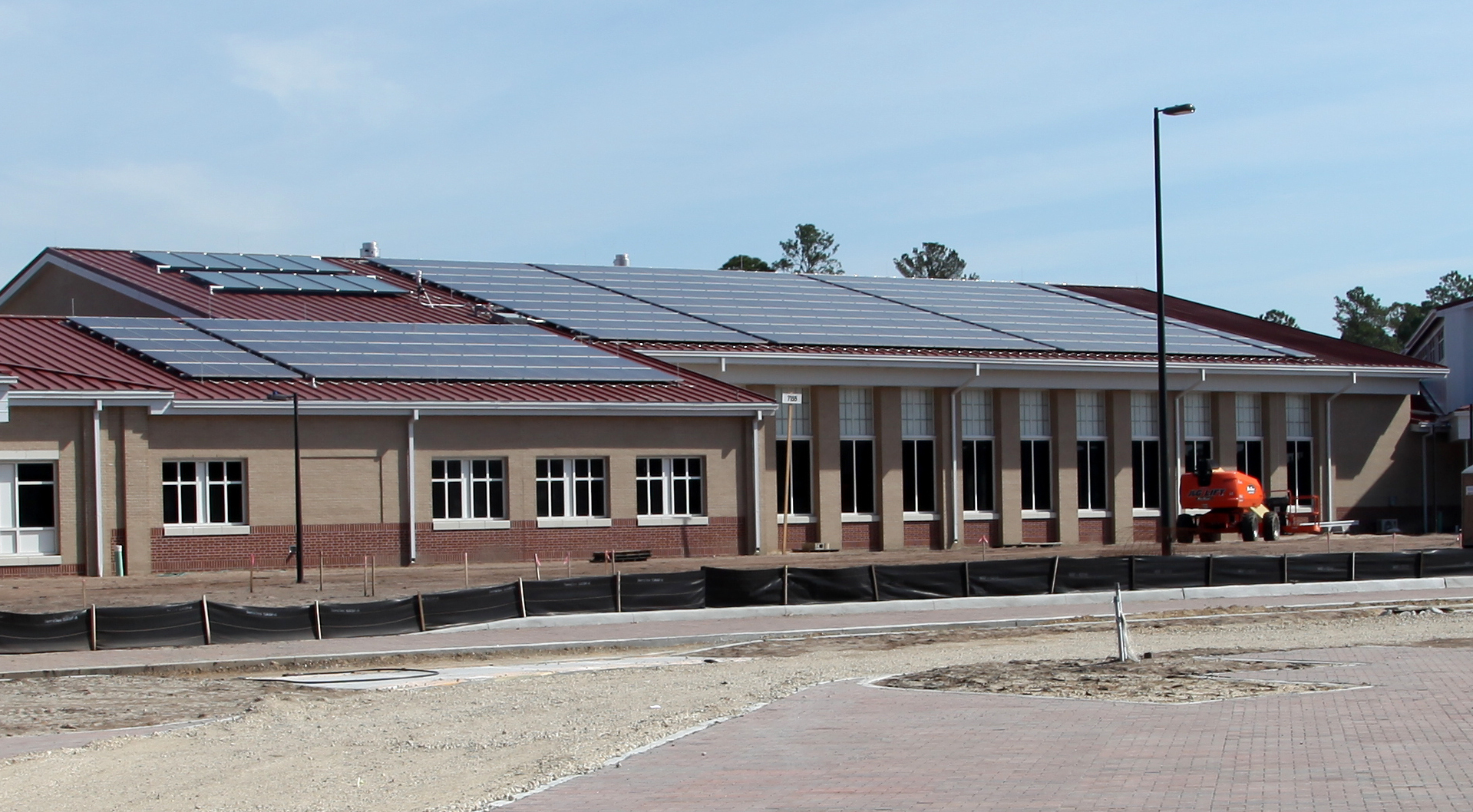
Solar roof, Murray Elementary School, Fort Stewart

Solar power in Georgia on rooftops can provide 31% of all electricity used in Georgia.

Net metering is limited to 100 kW for non-residential consumers and 10 kW for residential consumers, up to 0.2% of previous years peak demand. Georgia was given an F for net metering. Georgia is not a net metering state.

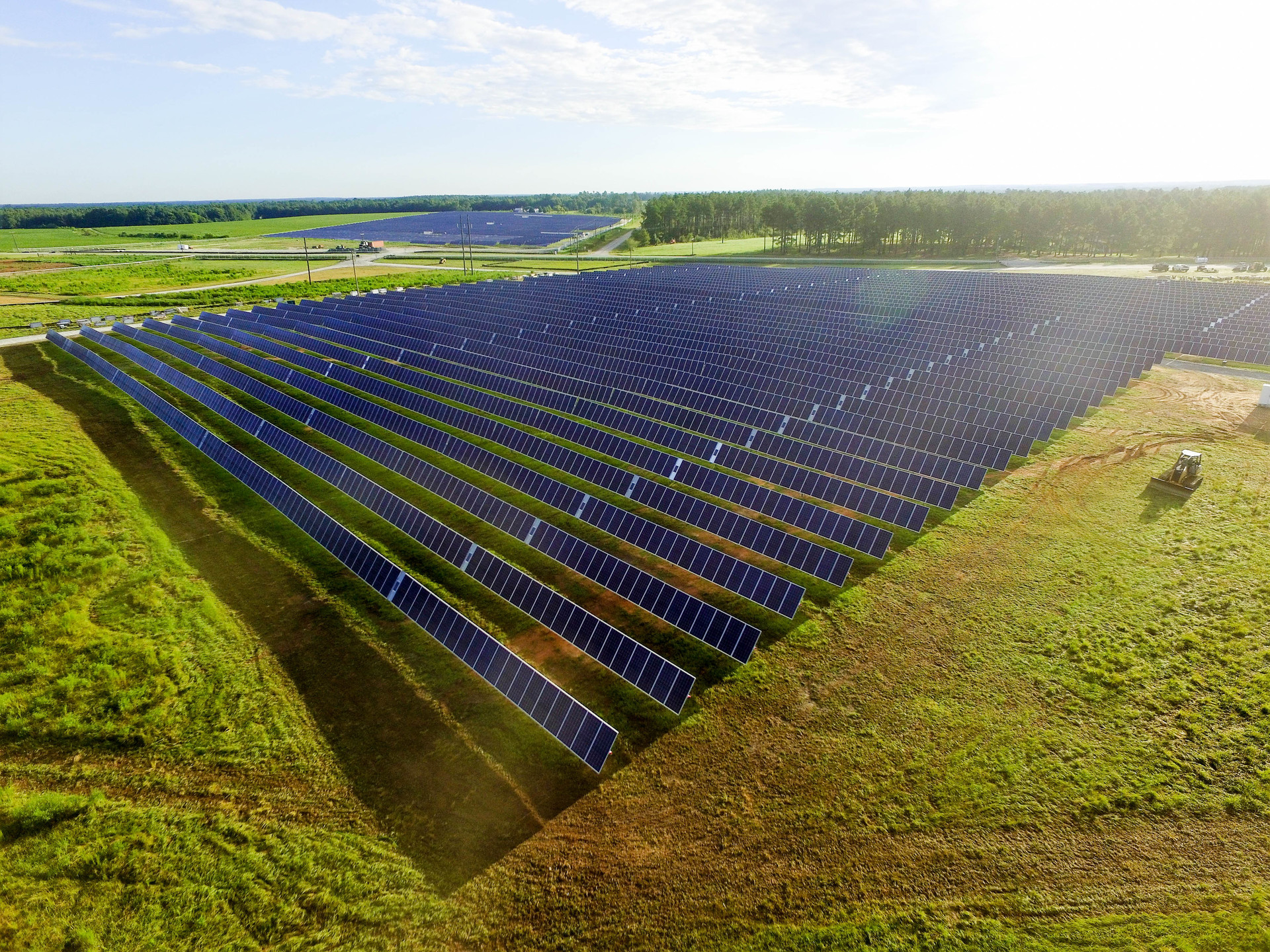
Old Midville solar project, Millen

The state's first solar community is located at Weatherford Place in Roswell. All homes are LEED Certified Platinum and monitored. The solar generation is compared to GP totals each month. The past 6 years of data monitoring show that GP meter consistently records less produced power. GP does not pay "time of day rates" as do many other states and also requires the homeowner to sign over all "environmental attributes" [solar renewable energy credits or SRECs] if the homeowner chooses to sell back all solar energy. Similar results are being seen at a Zero Net Energy home [the architectural design and training was a pro-bono project of Cadmus Design-Build and is being monitored by UGA] located in Tifton, GA. In other states such as California, New Jersey, New York, North Carolina, Pennsylvania, etc.] the accumulated SRECs can be sold by the owner of the system. Georgia does not allow the sale of SRECs. Georgia Power is also charging the homeowner tax on the solar energy that is sold back to GP. According to the Database of State Incentives for Renewable Energy, Renewable energy is not taxable.

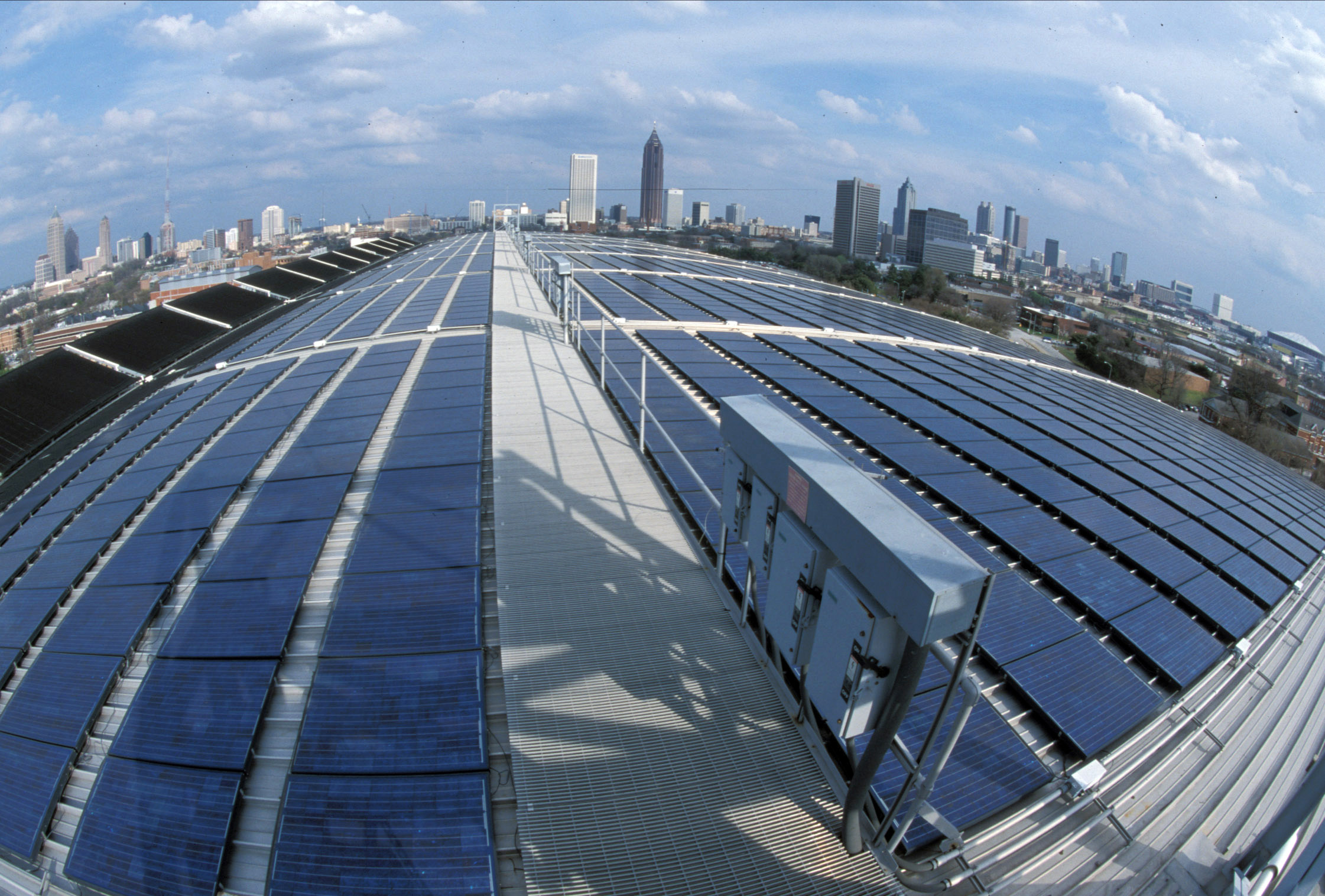
Solar panels, Georgia Tech Aquatic Center

Georgia Power has a solar purchase program, SP-1, for up to 100 kW systems which pays 17¢/kWh. A second meter is installed for the solar generation, all of which is purchased by Georgia Power. The consumer then purchases back any electricity consumed as if they did not have solar power. The program has an aggregate limit of 4.4 MW and is fully subscribed, but will be expanded as consumers purchase "Premium Green Energy", for an additional $5.00/100kWh. Once a consumer enters the program there is no reason to also purchase green energy, as doing so would reduce the 17 cent payment to 12 cents. By comparison, Ontario paid 80¢Canadian/kWh, and Germany €34.05¢/kWh, both with 20 year contracts, vs. the 5-year contract from Georgia Power. Long term power agreements are essential to renewable energy projects, as you pay upfront for 25 years of electricity - the "fuel", the sun or wind, is free, and most of the cost of wind power or solar power is the installation cost.

Approved by the state's Public Service Commission in 2012 and significantly expanded in the following year, Georgia Power's 'Advanced Solar Initiative' is expected to bring online 865 MW of solar capacity by the end of 2016.

In 1982 the country's largest industrial solar installation was completed, the 400 kW Solar Total Energy Project, which operated until 1991.

The $5 million 1 MW Spectro PowerCap on the Hickory Ridge Landfill near Atlanta was one of Georgia's largest solar arrays, when it was completed in October 2011. Another 1MW solar farm in Blairsville was completed in January 2011.

A 30 MW solar farm was built in Social Circle, and began operations in December 2013.

In 2011, Georgia was one of three states being considered for a 400 MW solar park, to consist of 20 20 MW sections. Other states being considered were Florida and North Carolina. Gadsden County, Florida, was chosen. The company, National Solar, is planning 3,000 MW of solar farms in the Southeast.

== Currently operating (Note: As of December 31, 2025) ==
=== Appalachian Plateau region ===
Based on the EIA dataset, there are currently no operable utility-scale solar facilities located in Georgia's Appalachian Plateau region.

=== Blue Ridge region ===
Based on the EIA dataset, there are currently no operable utility-scale solar facilities located in Georgia's Blue Ridge region.

=== Coastal Plain regions ===
==== Lower Coastal Plain region ====
Solar Facilities in Georgia (The Lower Coastal Plain)
#	Plant Name	Utility Name	County	Capacity (MW)	Operating Year
1	Blackwater Solar	Blackwater Solar, LLC	Ware	80.0	2024
2	Bryan Floyd	Madison Energy Holdings LLC	Bryan	1.9	2023
3	Fort Stewart Solar Facility	Georgia Power Co	Liberty	30.0	2016
4	Fountain Folkston	Westbound Solar LLC	Charlton	2.1	2019
5	IKEA Savannah 490	IKEA Property Inc	Chatham	1.2	2012
6	IKEA Savannah 490	IKEA Property Inc	Chatham	1.0	2021
7	Kings Bay Solar Facility	Georgia Power Co	Camden	30.0	2016
8	Lakeland Solar Energy LLC	Invenergy Services LLC	Lanier	1.8	2013
9	Lowndes Cowart	Madison Energy Investments LLC	Lowndes	3.0	2023
10	Lowndes IDA	Safari Energy, LLC	Lowndes	1.5	2020
11	Lowndes Tycor Farms	Safari Energy, LLC	Lowndes	2.3	2020
12	Moody Air Force Base Solar	Georgia Power Co	Lowndes	49.5	2020
13	Pierce Eunice	Westbound Solar 3, LLC	Pierce	1.9	2023
14	Quitman II Solar	Quitman II Solar, LLC	Brooks	150.0	2021
15	Quitman Solar	Quitman Solar, LLC	Brooks	150.0	2019
16	Solar Glynn	Cypress Creek Renewables	Glynn	18.0	2016
17	Valdosta (Terraform)	Terraform Arcadia	Lowndes	1.0	2013
18	Valdosta Prison	Madison Energy Holdings LLC	Lowndes	1.0	2017
19	Ware Avra I	Safari Energy, LLC	Ware	3.0	2020
20	Ware Avra II	Safari Energy, LLC	Ware	1.9	2020
21	Westberry Jesup	Westbound Solar LLC	Wayne	2.6	2020

==== Upper Coastal Plain region ====
Solar Facilities in Georgia (The Upper Coastal Plain)
#	Plant Name	Utility Name	County	Capacity (MW)	Operating Year
1	Apalachicola	Westbound Solar LLC	Richmond	2.5	2019
2	Arnold Cochran	Westbound Solar LLC	Bleckley	1.7	2020
3	Azalea Solar, LLC	Onward Energy	Washington	7.7	2013
4	BE Solar LLC	Cardinal Renewables	Decatur	3.0	2022
5	Bainbridge Solar	Bainbridge Solar, LLC	Decatur	1.0	2019
6	Baxley	SR Baxley, LLC	Appling	25.0	2020
7	Bibb Williams	Madison Energy Holdings LLC	Bibb	2.3	2023
8	Bird Dog Solar	Bird Dog Solar, LLC	Burke	40.0	2023
9	Brady Solar LLC	Cardinal Renewables	Sumter	1.8	2023
10	Bulloch County GA S3 LLC	SolRiver Capital LLC	Bulloch	3.0	2023
11	Bulloch County GA S4 LLC	SolRiver Capital LLC	Bulloch	3.0	2023
12	Bulloch Neville Farms	Safari Energy, LLC	Bulloch	2.7	2020
13	Bulloch Rushing	Westbound Solar 3, LLC	Bulloch	2.9	2023
14	Butler Solar Farm 20	Southern Power Co	Taylor	22.0	2016
15	Butler Solar Project 103	Southern Power Co	Taylor	104.0	2016
16	CPV Stagecoach Solar	CPV Stagecoach Solar, LLC	Macon	80.0	2024
17	Cairo Solar Farm, LLC	Southeastern Solar Farm Fund, LLC	Grady	2.0	2017
18	Camilla Solar Energy Project	Invenergy Services LLC	Mitchell	171.4	2020
19	Camilla Solar Plant	Axium US Solar Holdings LLC	Mitchell	16.0	2013
20	Coody Cochran	Westbound Solar LLC	Bleckley	2.6	2019
21	Cool Springs Solar (Hybrid)	Cool Springs Solar, LLC	Decatur	213.0	2021
22	Curry Solar	Altus Power America Management, LLC	Tattnall	1.1	2015
23	Decatur County Solar Project	Southern Power Co	Decatur	20.0	2015
24	Decatur Parkway Solar Project, LLC	Southern Power Co	Decatur	80.0	2015
25	Decatur Solar	Washington County Solar, LLC	Decatur	200.0	2024
26	Denver Braswell PV	Madison Energy Holdings LLC	Colquitt	1.4	2017
27	Dougherty County Solar, LLC	Dougherty County Solar, LLC	Dougherty	120.0	2019
28	Dublin Solar I	AES Distributed Energy	Laurens	4.1	2015
29	Fort Gordon Solar Facility	Georgia Power Co	Richmond	30.0	2016
30	Fort Valley State University Solar	Georgia Power Co	Peach	10.8	2022
31	Freeman Avenue	Westbound Solar LLC	Sumter	1.4	2019
32	Georgia Power at Jakin GA PV	Luminace Solar Georgia 2, LLC	Early	1.5	2017
33	Georgia Power at Swainsboro	Luminace Solar Georgia 2, LLC	Emanuel	2.9	2017
34	Georgia Power at Wadley GA	Luminace Solar Georgia, LLC	Jefferson	1.0	2014
35	Guyton Community Solar	Georgia Power Co	Effingham	3.6	2019
36	Hazlehurst II	SR South Loving, LLC	Jeff Davis	52.5	2016
37	Hazlehurst III	SR Hazlehurst III, LLC	Jeff Davis	40.0	2019
38	Hickory Park Solar Hybrid	RWE Clean Energy	Mitchell	195.5	2022
39	Hobnail Solar	Hobnail Solar, LLC	Burke	70.0	2023
40	Lancaster Solar GA	Lancaster Solar GA, LLC	Randolph	80.0	2021
41	Live Oak Solar, LLC	Live Oak Solar, LLC	Candler	51.0	2016
42	Marine Corps Logistics Base Solar	Georgia Power Co	Dougherty	31.0	2018
43	McCleskey Cotton	Westbound Solar LLC	Terrell	1.9	2019
44	McIntosh Solar	Georgia Power Co	Effingham	10.0	2024
45	Muscogee Public Works	Westbound Solar LLC	Muscogee	1.5	2019
46	OE_GA3	Onward Energy	Mitchell	57.5	2020
47	Oil Dri 2 Solar	Westbound Solar LLC	Thomas	1.4	2019
48	Old Midville Solar	Citizens Enterprises Corporation	Jenkins	19.7	2016
49	Pawpaw Solar Plant	Southern Power Co	Taylor	30.5	2016
50	Reidsville Renewables, Inc.	Safari Energy, LLC	Tattnall	3.0	2023
51	Richland (GA)	Terraform Arcadia	Stewart	1.0	2014
52	Richland Solar Center	Onward Energy	Twiggs	20.0	2015
53	Richmond County GA S2 LLC	SolRiver Capital LLC	Richmond	3.0	2023
54	Richmond Hayes Solar	Westbound Solar LLC	Richmond	2.3	2018
55	Rincon Solar I	AES Distributed Energy	Effingham	18.4	2016
56	Robins Air Force Base Solar	Georgia Power Co	Bibb	128.0	2021
57	SR Ailey	SR Ailey, LLC	Montgomery	80.0	2024
58	SR Arlington I	SR Arlington, LLC	Early	20.0	2021
59	SR Arlington II	SR Arlington II MT, LLC	Early	102.5	2019
60	SR Cedar Springs, LLC	SR Cedar Springs, LLC	Early	70.0	2022
61	SR Clay, LLC	SR Clay, LLC	Clay	106.0	2022
62	SR DeSoto I, LLC	SR DeSoto I, LLC	Lee	165.0	2022
63	SR DeSoto II	SR DeSoto II, LLC	Lee	65.0	2023
64	SR DeSoto III	SR DeSoto III, LLC	Lee	60.0	2023
65	SR Hazlehurst	SR Hazlehurst, LLC	Jeff Davis	20.0	2015
66	SR Lumpkin	SR Lumpkin, LLC	Stewart	100.0	2021
67	SR Odom	Odom Solar, LLC	Colquitt	20.0	2020
68	SR Perry	SR Perry, LLC	Houston	68.0	2021
69	SR Snipesville II	SR Snipesville II, LLC	Jeff Davis	107.0	2021
70	SR Snipesville III	SR Snipesville III, LLC	Jeff Davis	107.0	2023
71	SR Terrell	SR Terrell, LLC	Terrell	74.0	2020
72	SR Toombs, LLC	SR Toombs I, LLC	Montgomery	250.0	2025
73	Seminole (GA)	Terraform Arcadia	Seminole	1.6	2014
74	Shawnee - GA	Westbound Solar LLC	Burke	2.0	2020
75	Snipesville	SR Snipesville, LLC	Jeff Davis	86.0	2020
76	Statesboro Solar LLC	Cardinal Renewables	Bulloch	3.0	2022
77	Taylor County Solar	Southern Power Co	Taylor	148.0	2016
78	Telfair Thompson	Westbound Solar LLC	Telfair	1.9	2018
79	Terrell Riles Stovall	Safari Energy, LLC	Terrell	1.7	2020
80	Tift Bowen	Madison Energy Investments LLC	Tift	1.9	2023
81	Tift Boyd	Westbound Solar 3, LLC	Tift	2.9	2022
82	Tift Fletcher	Madison Energy Investments LLC	Tift	3.0	2023
83	Twiggs Solar	Onward Energy	Twiggs	204.0	2020
84	Wadley Solar	Wadley Solar, LLC	Jefferson	260.0	2025
85	Washington County Solar	Washington County Solar, LLC	Washington	150.0	2024
86	Waynesboro Community Solar	Georgia Power Co	Burke	2.4	2019
87	White Oak Solar, LLC	White Oak Solar, LLC	Burke	76.5	2016
88	White Pine Solar, LLC	White Pine Solar, LLC	Taylor	101.2	2016
89	Wilkinson DeFore (Safari Energy)	Safari Energy, LLC	Wilkinson	3.0	2020
90	Wilkinson DeFore (Westbound)	Westbound Solar LLC	Wilkinson	2.3	2019

=== Piedmont region ===
Solar Facilities in Georgia (The Piedmont)
#	Plant Name	Utility Name	County	Capacity (MW)	Operating Year
1	Atlanta Falcons Solar	Georgia Power Co	Fulton	0.3	2015
2	Atlanta Falcons Solar	Georgia Power Co	Fulton	0.5	2016
3	Atlanta Falcons Solar	Georgia Power Co	Fulton	0.2	2017
4	Bulldog Solar LLC	Bulldog Solar LLC	Warren	80.0	2023
5	Camp Solar Plant	Axium US Solar Holdings LLC	Meriwether	2.4	2013
6	Cedar Creek Solar, LLC	Southeastern Solar Farm Fund, LLC	Barrow	2.0	2017
7	Columbia Bryson	Westbound Solar LLC	Columbia	1.4	2018
8	Columbia Substation	Westbound Solar LLC	Columbia	2.0	2020
9	Comer Solar	Georgia Power Co	Madison	2.0	2018
10	Franklin Milliken	Safari Energy, LLC	Franklin	3.0	2020
11	Gratis Road Solar Facility	Walton Solar	Walton	3.0	2018
12	Greene Durham	Safari Energy, LLC	Greene	3.0	2020
13	Greenville	Terraform Arcadia	Meriwether	1.0	2014
14	Harris Shiloh	Westbound Solar LLC	Harris	2.1	2020
15	Hickory Ridge Landfill Solar Project	BFI Waste Systems of GA, LLC	DeKalb	0.6	2011
16	Kimberly-Clark Solar	Madison Energy Investments LLC	Troup	2.3	2019
17	Laredo Bus Facility Solar Canopies	MARTA	DeKalb	1.0	2012
18	Meriwether Jackson	Safari Energy, LLC	Meriwether	3.0	2020
19	Mount Vernon Solar	Walton Electric Member Corp	Walton	1.0	2015
20	Pleasant Valley Solar	Walton Electric Member Corp	Walton	2.5	2016
21	Putnam Erickson	Safari Energy, LLC	Putnam	2.7	2020
22	Putnam Erikson 2	SolAmerica Energy, LLC	Putnam	2.9	2021
23	Simon Solar Farm LLC	Simon Solar Farm, LLC	Walton	30.0	2013
24	Solar BESS Hybrid	Cobb Electric Membership Corporation	Cobb	1.5	2020
25	Sonny Solar LLC	Pine Gate Renewables	Elbert	40.0	2023
26	Timberland Solar	RWE Clean Energy	Oglethorpe	140.0	2025
27	Tri-County Solar Facility	Georgia Power Co	Putnam	1.0	2016
28	Troup RC50	Westbound Solar LLC	Harris	2.3	2019
29	Troup RC50 II	Safari Energy, LLC	Troup	1.5	2020
30	Turnipseed Solar, LLC	Southeastern Solar Farm Fund, LLC	Douglas	3.0	2017
31	Upson County GA S1 LLC	SolRiver Capital LLC	Upson	3.0	2023
32	Upson Rocky Creek Solar Plant	Axium US Solar Holdings LLC	Upson	0.8	2012
33	Wolfskin Solar	Wolfskin Solar, LLC	Oglethorpe	38.0	2024

=== Valley and Ridge region ===
Solar Facilities in Georgia (The Valley and Ridge)
#	Plant Name	Utility Name	County	Capacity (MW)	Operating Year
1	Bartow Davidson	Madison Energy Holdings LLC	Bartow	2.6	2023
2	Chattooga Gore	Westbound Solar 3, LLC	Chattooga	2.4	2023
3	Dalton 2	Georgia Power Co	Murray	6.5	2014
4	Gordon Pine Hall	Westbound Solar 3, LLC	Gordon	2.4	2023
5	Gordon Thompson	Westbound Solar 3, LLC	Gordon	3.0	2022
6	Murray Treadwell Farms	Safari Energy, LLC	Murray	3.0	2020
7	Polk Cedartown	Westbound Solar LLC	Polk	2.2	2019
8	Polk Cedartown 2	Westbound Solar 3, LLC	Polk	2.4	2023
9	Polk County GA S1, LLC	Safari Energy, LLC	Polk	3.0	2023
10	Rockmart	Cardinal Renewables	Polk	2.6	2022
11	Whitfield Cooper	Westbound Solar 3, LLC	Whitfield	1.1	2022

== Statistics ==
Source: NREL

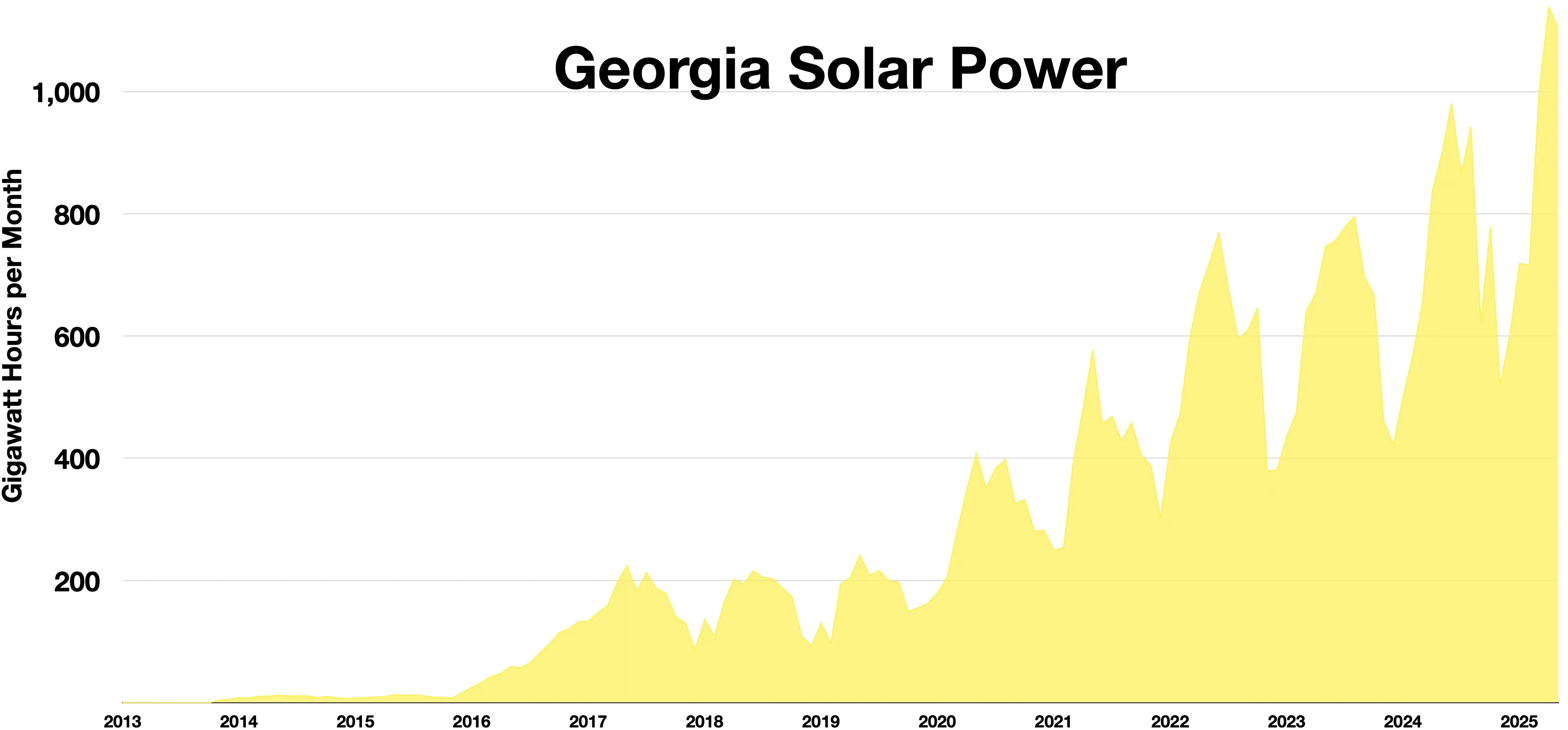
Georgia solar power from 2013 to 2025

Grid-connected PV capacity (MWp)
Year	Capacity	Installed	% change
2008	0.1		
2009	0.2	0.1	100%
2010	1.8	1.6	800%
2011	6.9	5.1	283%
2012	21.4	8.2	210%
2013	109.9	88.5	414%
2014	160	50	46%
2015	370	209	131%
2016	1,470	1,100	297%
2017	1,555	85	5.7%
2018	1,568	13	0.8%
2019	2,448.1	880.1	56%
2020	2,757.9	309.8	12.7%
2021	4,268.5	1,510.6	%
2022	5,033	764.5	%

Utility-scale solar generation in Georgia (GWh)
Year	Total	Jan	Feb	Mar	Apr	May	Jun	Jul	Aug	Sep	Oct	Nov	Dec
2013	11	0	0	0	0	0	0	0	0	0	0	5	6
2014	120	8	8	11	11	13	11	11	12	9	11	8	7
2015	129	8	9	9	10	13	12	13	12	9	9	8	17
2016	880	25	34	43	48	59	57	66	82	97	115	121	133
2017	1,988	134	148	160	198	225	183	214	188	179	141	131	87
2018	1,995	136	108	165	202	194	216	206	203	188	174	109	94
2019	2,162	131	98	194	205	242	209	217	200	198	150	155	163
2020	3,901	182	224	281	350	414	379	414	417	348	340	281	271
2021	3,451	254	267	408	497	582	489	491	463				

== See also ==
- Solar power in the United States
- Renewable energy in the United States
