= Southeastern Freight Lines =

American trucking company

- Type: Private
- Industry: Freight transport
- Founded: 1950; 76 years ago
- Founder: W. T. Cassels
- Headquarters: Lexington, South Carolina, United States
- Area served: Southeastern and Southwestern United States
- Key people: W. T. "Bill" Cassels, Jr. (CEO/Chairman) W.T. "Tobin" Cassels III (President)
- Number of employees: 8,500 (2021)
- Subsidiaries: Southeastern Logistics Services
- Website: sefl.com

Southeastern Freight Lines (SEFL) is a privately owned American less than truckload (LTL) trucking company based in Lexington, South Carolina, that operates in the Southeastern and Southwestern United States.

== History ==
Southeastern Freight Lines was founded in 1950 by William T. Cassels in Lexington, South Carolina. The company first had 14 trucks and 20 employees with a $5,000 loan. In 1975 W. T. "Bill" Cassels, Jr. became President of Southeastern Freight. The Florence facility was opened in September 1953 where Bill Cassels, Jr. operated one of three trucks.

On October 2, 1987 W. T. Cassels died leaving his son Cassels, Jr. as CEO of Southeastern Freight. "Tobin" Cassels III, who worked at Southeastern Freight since 1973, became President in 2001. The Augusta service center was established in March 1976. The expansion into the Southwest began in the 1990s with the establishment of a facility in New Orleans in 1996.

Southeastern Freight expanded into the Texas market by expanding in Tyler in 2005. Eight years later Southeastern Freight further expanded in Texas with a Houston facility on February 21, 2013 and a Lubbock facility on May 11, 2015. International operations were expanded in October 2008 by offering four shipping options to Mexico. Kentucky operations of Southeastern Freight was established in 2015 with expansions to Lexington, Louisville and Bowling Green.

On November 2, 2015 the West Atlanta service center opened enabling service to customers of West Georgia and East Alabama.

In March 2024, Southeastern opened a service center in Bowling Green, Kentucky.

== Operations ==
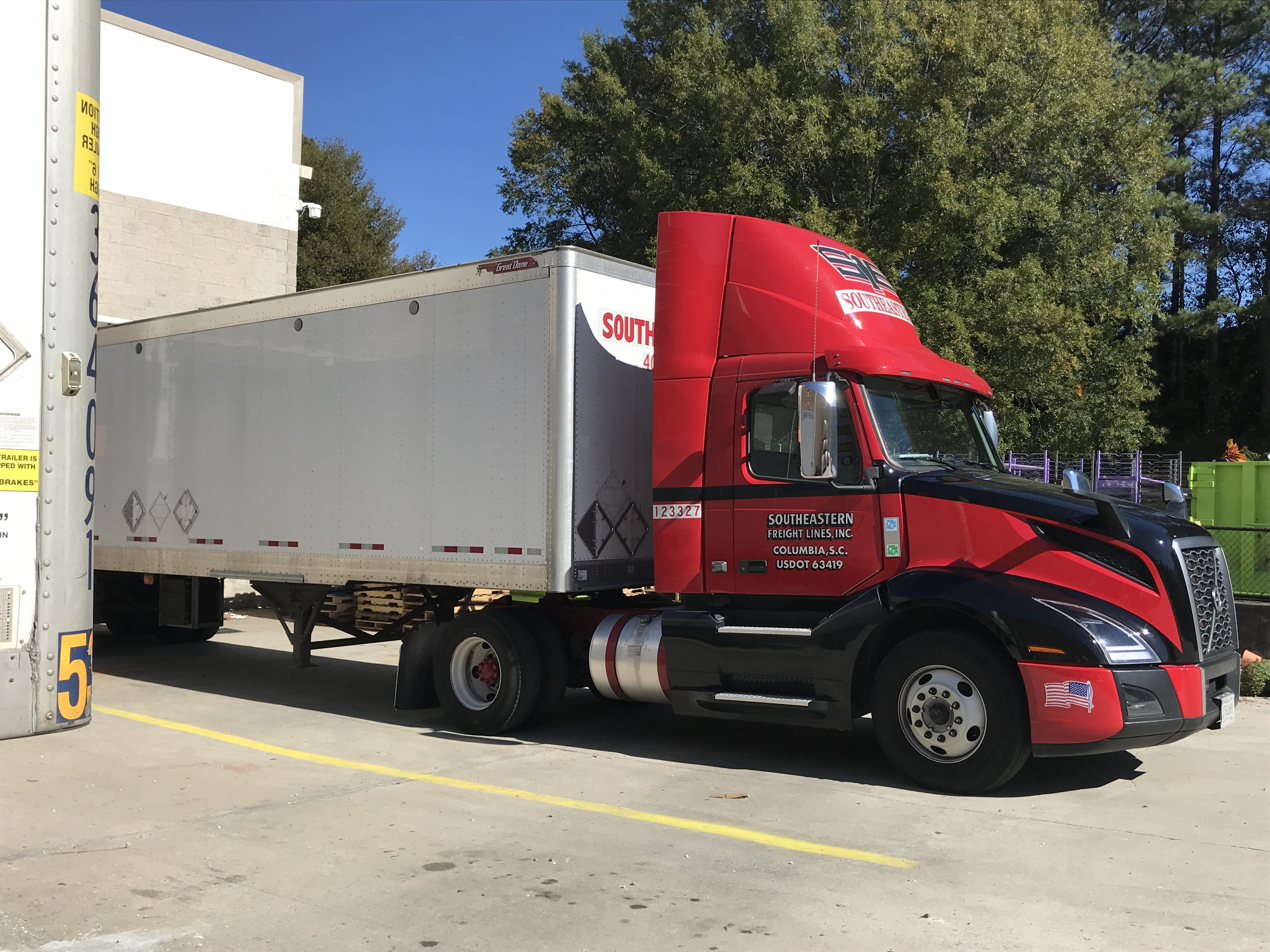
Southeastern Freight Lines truck

Southeastern Freight Lines operates 89 service centers in the Southeast, Southwest and Puerto Rico with a primary focus on next-day delivery, using its own line of semi-trailer trucks. The service centers were established to provide customers with reliable deliveries. There is also a network of service partners for transportation to other areas of the United States not in the South. Transportation internationally includes Canada, Mexico, and the United States Virgin Islands.

In 2011, Southeastern Logistics Solutions was launched as a subsidiary of Southeast Freight to provide expedited service and multi-modal transportation, focusing on projects that require collaborative capacity.
