= Hickory Ridge Landfill =

Municipal solid waste landfill located in Conley

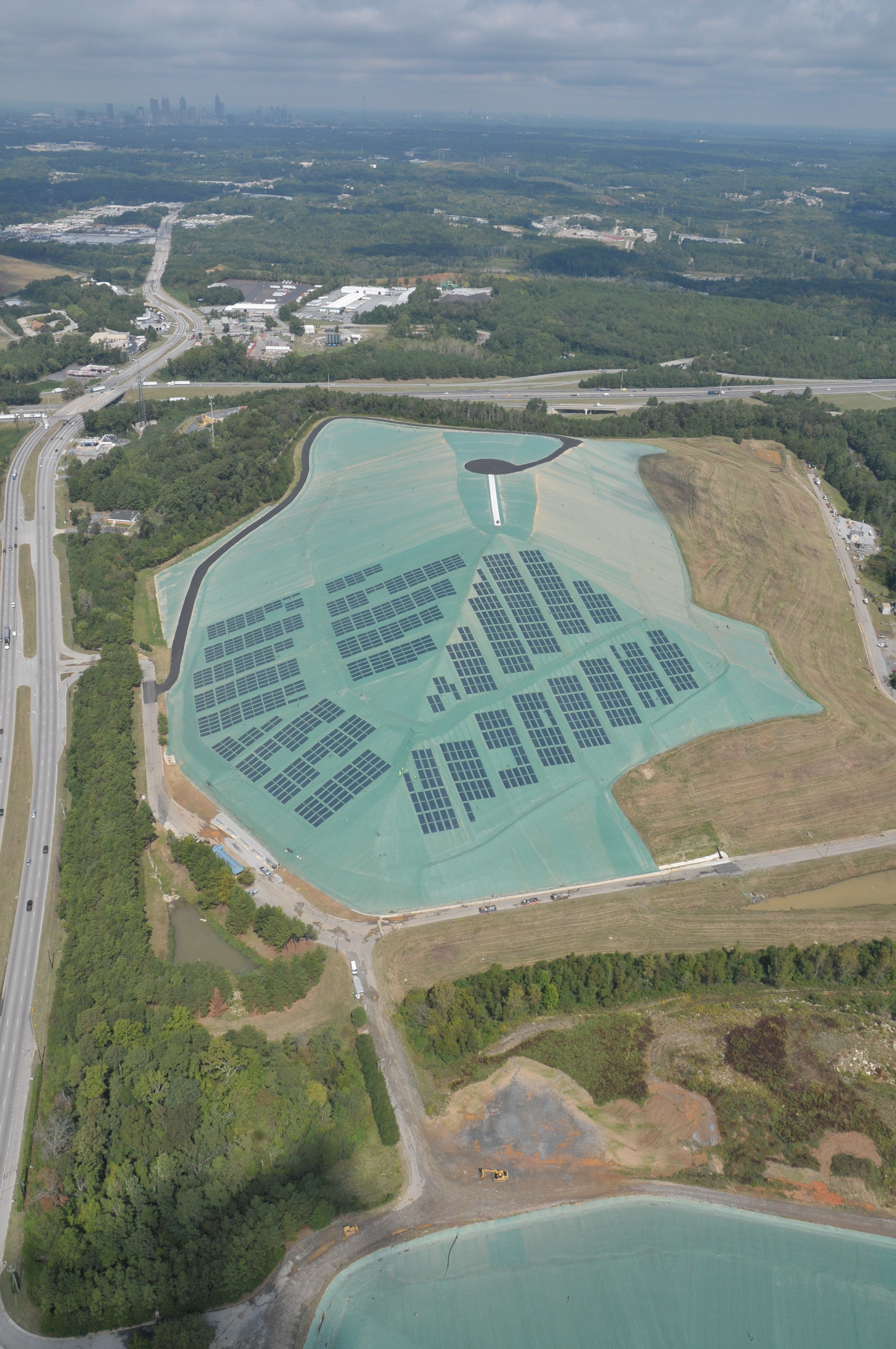
- Photo of completed project taken on 9/23/2011. Atlanta can be seen in the background.
- Country: United States
- Location: Conley, Georgia
- Coordinates: 33°39′54″N 84°20′06″W
- Status: Operational
- Construction began: 6/1/2011
- Commission date: 10/4/2011
- Construction cost: $5,000,000
- Owner: Republic Services, Inc.

Solar farm
- Type: Ground Mount, Flexible PV
- Site area: 48 acres

Power generation
- Units operational: 7,008 UNI-SOLAR PVL-144 photovoltaic panels
- Nameplate capacity: 1,009 KW
- Annual net output: 1.3 GWh

External links
- Website: carlisle.kiosk-view.com/hickory-ridge
- Commons: Related media on Commons

The Hickory Ridge Landfill is a municipal solid waste landfill located in Conley, Georgia, United States, and privately owned by Republic Services. The site was opened in 1993 and closed in 2006. It contains nearly 9,000,000 cubic yards (6,880,994 cubic meters) of waste.

The Hickory Ridge Landfill was capped in October 2011 with a dual-purpose landfill closure system referred to as a Geo membrane. The closure system provides renewable electricity via (photovoltaic) solar panels.

At the time of commissioning it was the largest solar photovoltaic system in the state of Georgia.

== System Details ==
The landfill closure system is a green, 60-mil scrim reinforced TPO (thermoplastic polyolefin) geomembrane covering 48 acres in total. A one-megawatt photovoltaic solar panel array is located on the southwest and southeast slopes of the landfill in an area of approximately 10 acres (4.0 ha).

The one-megawatt solar array has over 7,000 flexible solar laminates, composed of 36 laminates bonded one at a time to 12 feet (4.0 yd) wide by 120 feet (40 yd) long panels. Each photovoltaic roll was rated at 5,184 Wp DC.

The closure system meets infiltration and erosion criteria as prescribed by the United States' Environmental Protection Agency, while also capturing the methane gas that is generated by the landfill, turning it into energy in a separate operation. The Georgia Environmental Protection Division approved the landfill closure system as a "Final" closure system.

The photovoltaic system is actually composed of four separate arrays located on the 3H:1V slopes on the southeast and southwest areas of the landfill. Each photovoltaic array is rated for approximately 250kWp DC each; each with a 260kWp DC inverter.

The photovoltaic array is expected to generate 1,300,000 kWh in its first year of production.

Mas Energy secured the landfill gas rights for the Hickory Ridge Landfill from Republic Services, supplying fuel to their 6.5 Megawatt combined heat and power facility located at Coca-Cola's Cogen Plant in Atlanta, GA.

Coca-Cola is ranked third in the Top 20 Onsite Green Power Generators by the U.S. EPA Green Power Partnership as of July 5, 2012 mainly because of this system and the landfill gas from Hickory Ridge.

== Awards ==
The project has led to some awards received by some organisations, such as HDR Inc and the American Environmental Group (AEG). The HDR Inc. received the following awards for their engineering work on this project:

- 2012 – Grand Award, Engineering Excellence Awards, American Council of Engineering Companies of Georgia
- 2012 – Honor Award, Engineering Excellence Awards, American Council of Engineering Companies
- 2012 – ⁣Honor Award, American Academy of Environmental Engineers

The AEG received the 2013 Award of Excellence from the International Association of Geosynthetic Installers (IAGI) for their work as the geomembrane installer for the project.

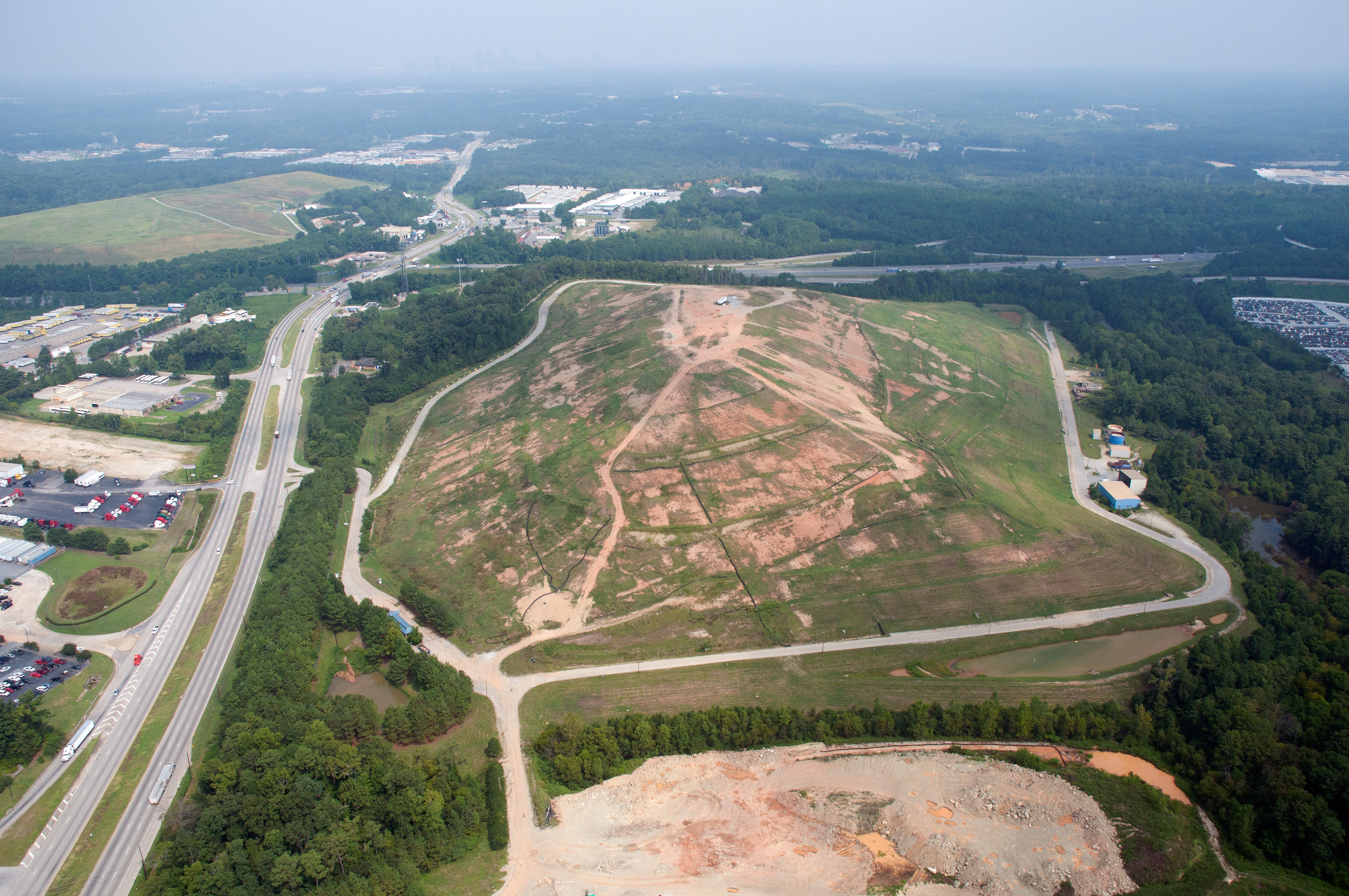
Photo taken on 8/25/2010 prior to construction

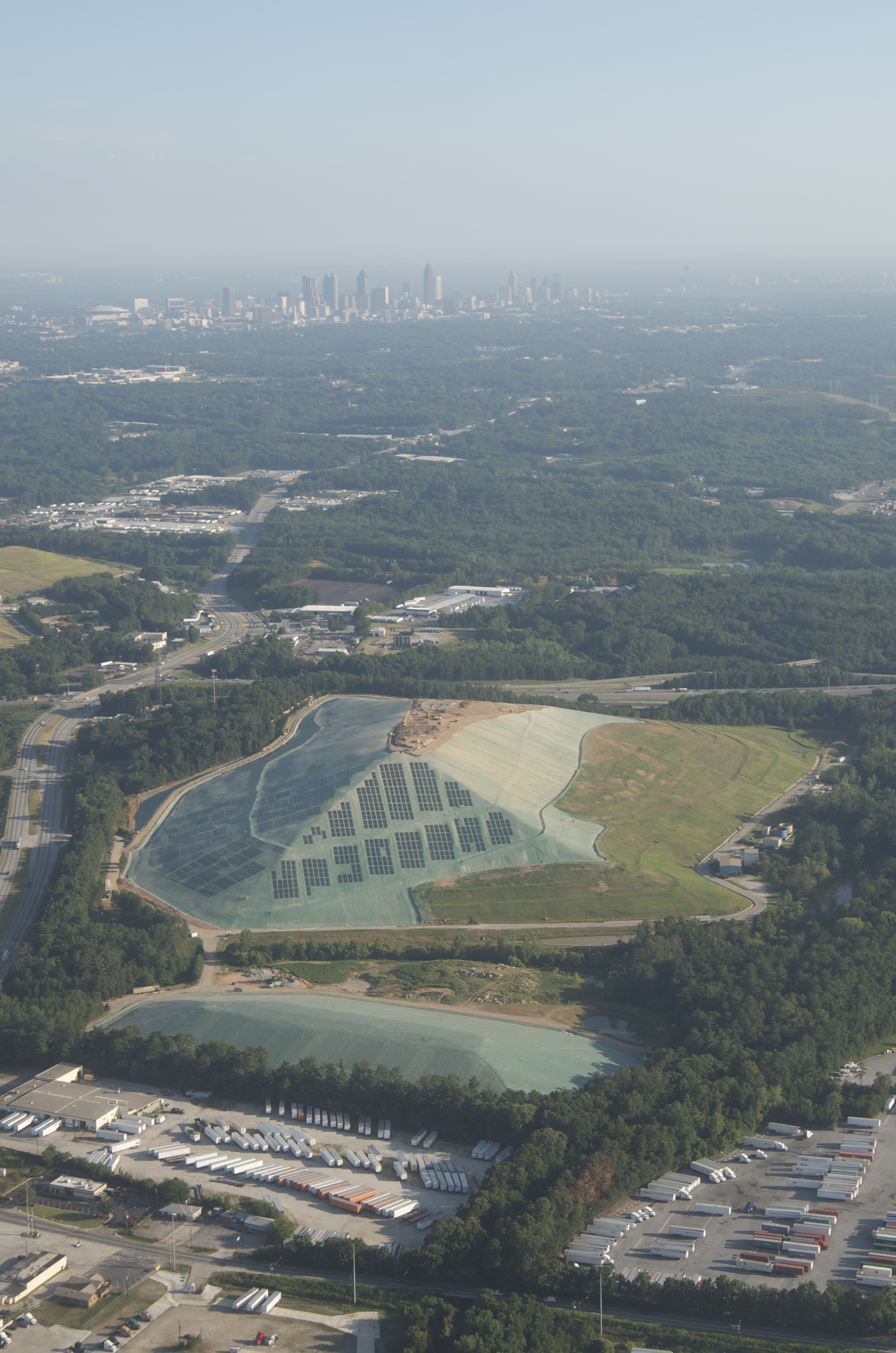
Hickory Ridge Landfill taken from airplane during landing into Atlanta's Hartsfield-Jackson Airport on 6/21/2011 - during construction

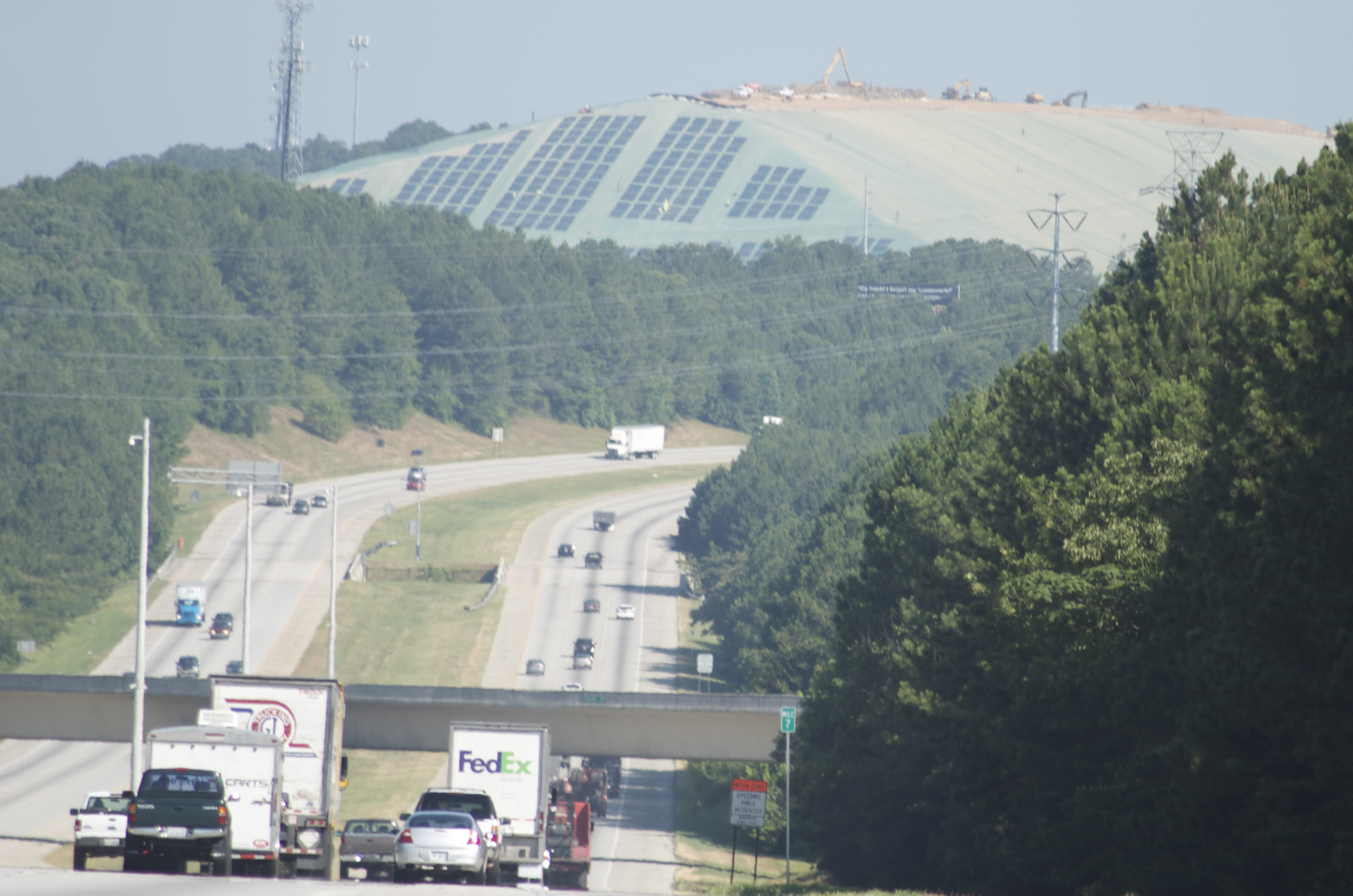
Photo of Hickory Ridge Landfill taken on 6/21/2011 while driving north on I-675
