= Climate change in Massachusetts =

Climate change in the US state of Massachusetts

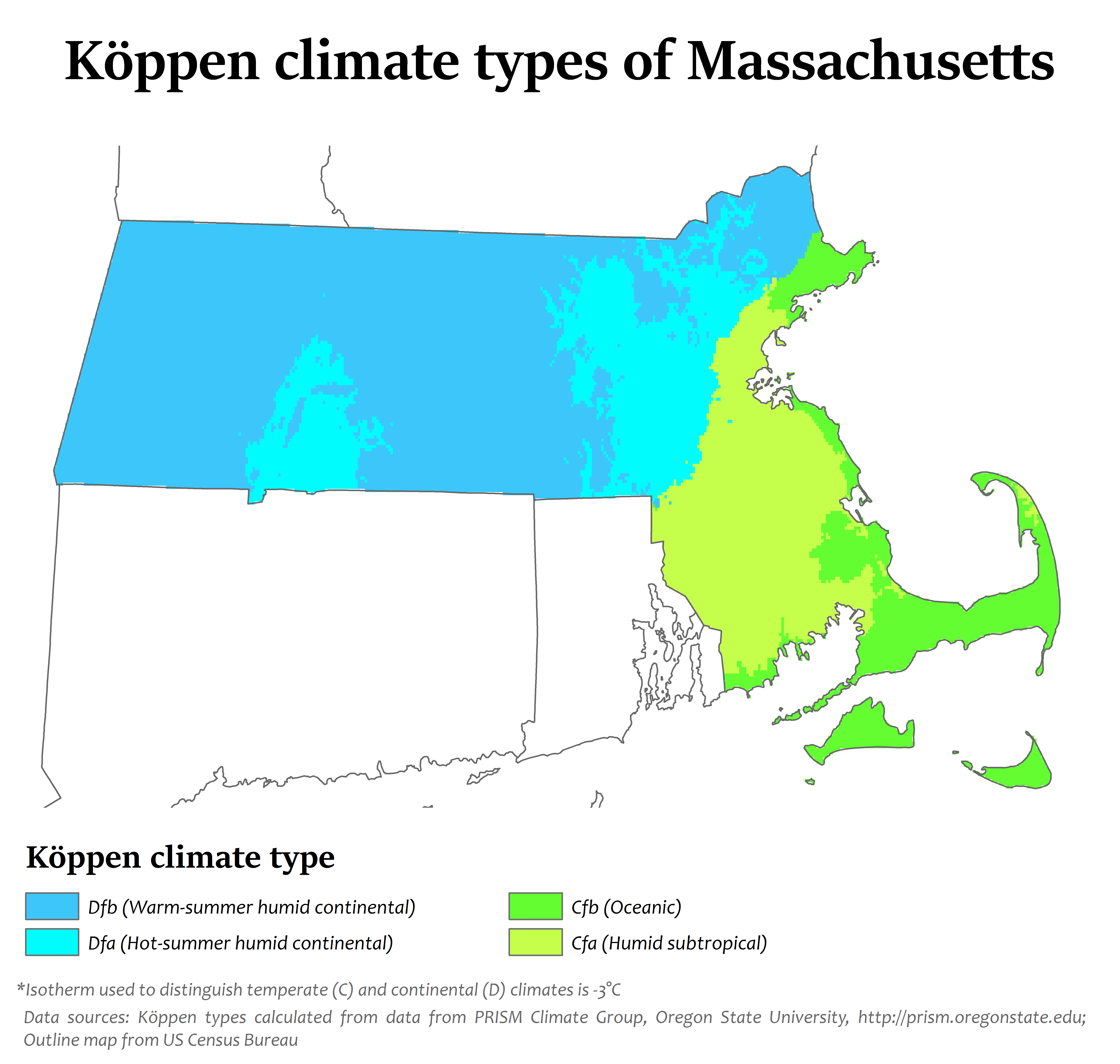
Köppen climate types in Massachusetts

Climate change in Massachusetts affects both urban and rural environments, including forestry, fisheries, agriculture, and coastal development. The Northeast is projected to warm faster than global average temperatures; by 2035, the Northeast is "projected to be more than 3.6°F (2°C) warmer on average than during the preindustrial era."

== Impacts of climate change ==
=== Sea level rise ===
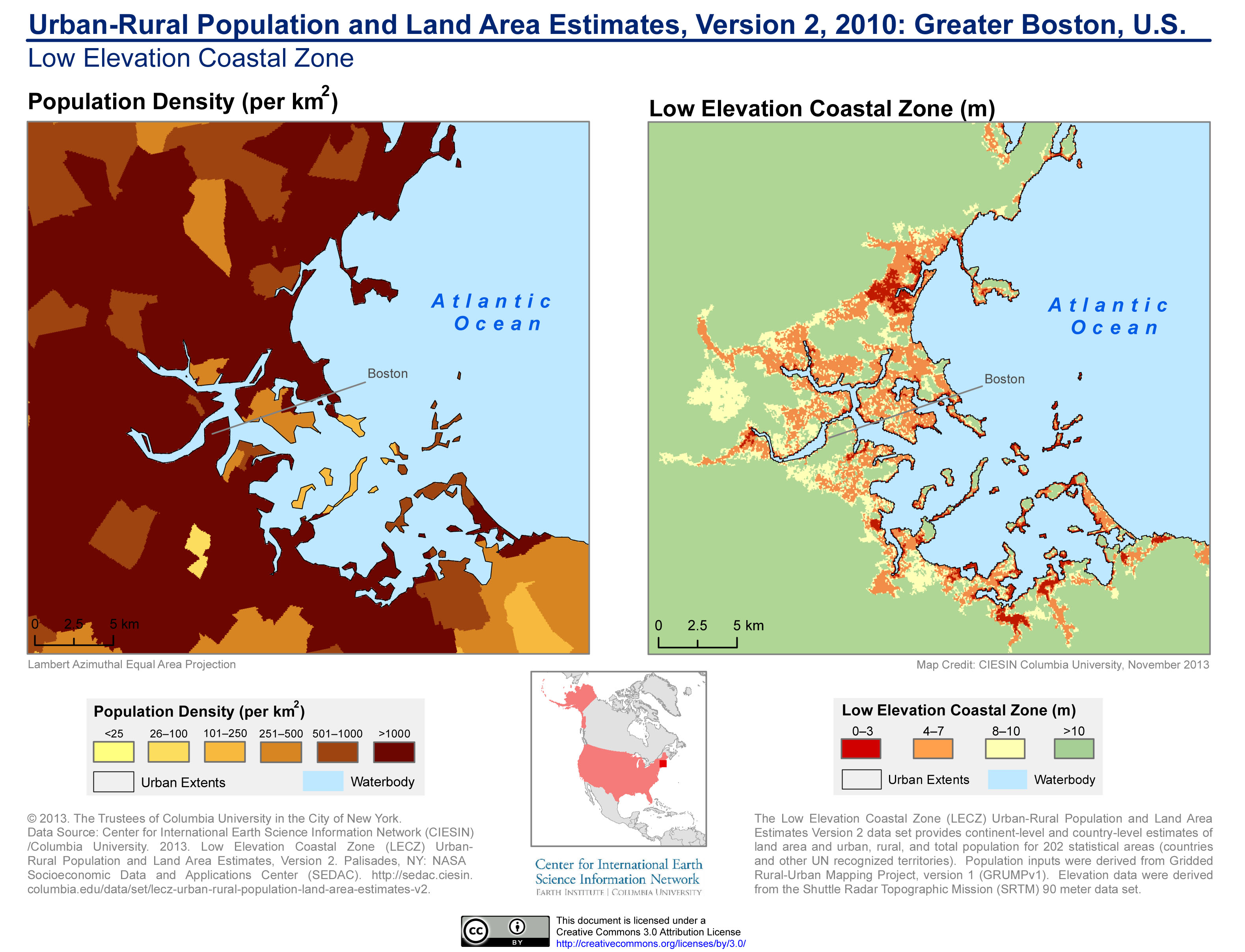
Population density and elevation above sea level in Greater Boston, U.S. (2010)

The city of Boston has identified specific projects in East Boston, Charlestown, and South Boston that would raise small parcels of land and use temporary barriers in key locations to prevent flooding during storms, which due to climate change will be higher than present. In 2016, Climate Ready Boston recommended studying the feasibility of a storm tidal barrier for Boston Harbor. The resulting report from the University of Massachusetts Boston Sustainable Solutions Lab concluded that such a barrier would not be cost-effective compared to a larger number of smaller-scale on-shore projects. A 2016 Executive Order established a climate change strategy for the Commonwealth.

A 2018 noreaster caused flooding in downtown Boston, Quincy, and Scituate, raising more concerns about the impact of sea level rise.

=== Ecosystems ===
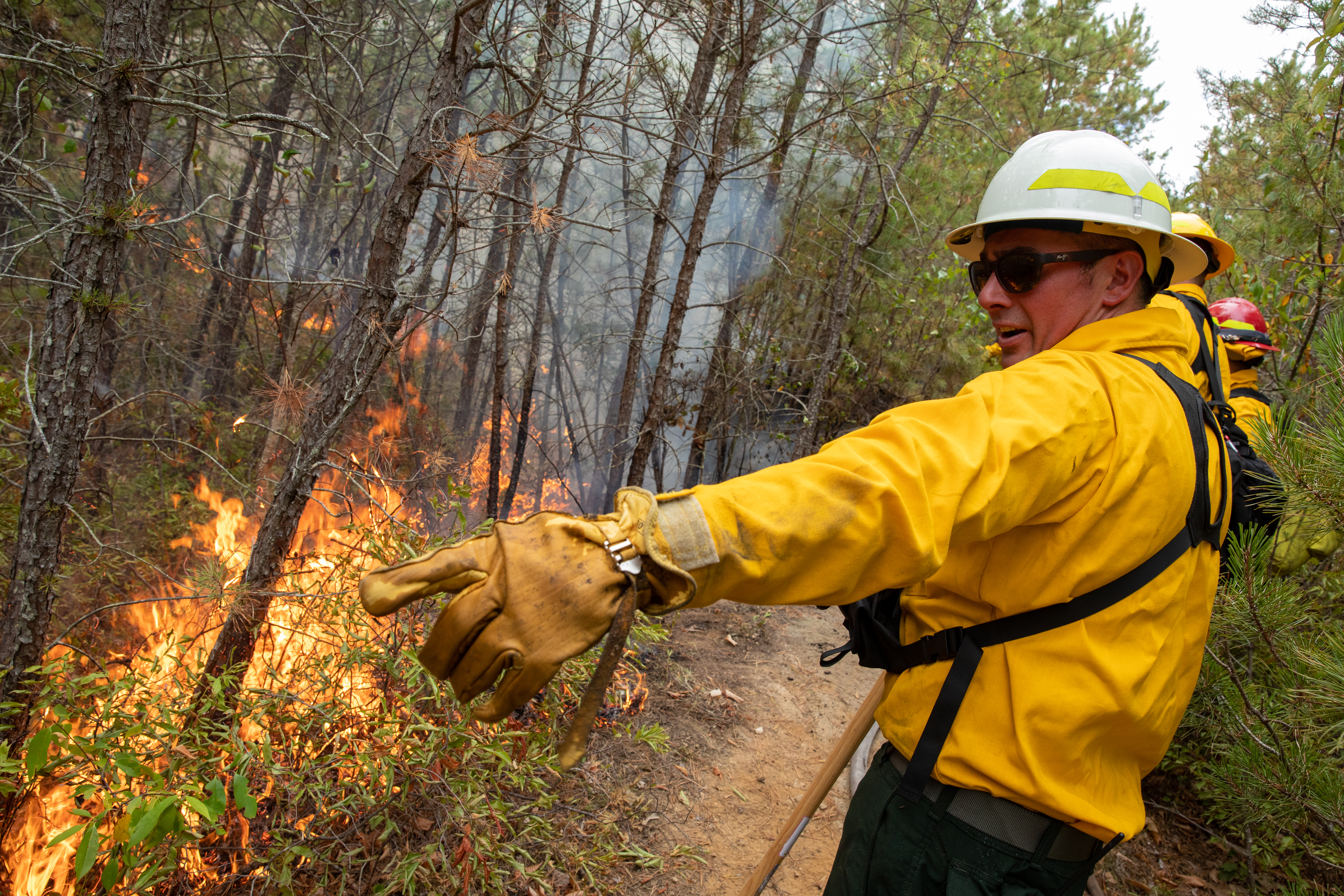
Briarwood Fire near Rockport, 2022

Climate change will affect fishing and farming. Marshlands on the coast of Massachusetts help mitigate storm surges, but development has reduced these crucial ecosystems.

There has also been a reduction in traditional state products due to the increased heat and warming waters. Cranberry harvests and maple syrup have been negatively impacted by climate change.

== Response ==
=== State laws and legislative action ===
Former Massachusetts Governor Deval Patrick signed into law three global warming and energy-related bills that will promote advanced biofuels, support the growth of the clean energy technology industry, and cut the emissions of greenhouse gases within the state. The Clean Energy Biofuels Act, signed in late July, 2008, exempts cellulosic ethanol from the state's gasoline tax, but only if the ethanol achieves a 60% reduction in greenhouse gas emissions relative to gasoline. The act also requires all diesel motor fuels and all No. 2 fuel oil sold for heating to include at least 2% "substitute fuel" by July 2010, where substitute fuel is defined as a fuel derived from renewable non-food biomass that achieves at least a 50% reduction in greenhouse gas emissions. The requirement for both motor diesel fuel and heating oil increases by a percentage point per year until 2013, after which it holds steady 5%. The act also allows the state to expand the requirement to other forms of fuel oil, and it requires the state to work to establish a low-carbon fuel standard under the Regional Greenhouse Gas Initiative.

In early August 2008, Governor Patrick signed two additional bills: the Green Jobs Act and the Global Warming Solutions Act. The Green Jobs Act will support the growth of a clean energy technology industry within the state, backed by $68 million in funding over 5 years. The Global Warming Solutions Act requires a reduction of greenhouse gas emissions in the state to 10%-25% below 1990 levels by 2020 and to 80% below 1990 levels by 2050. Under the act, the Massachusetts Department of Environmental Protection will carry the burdens of determining the baseline level of emissions in 1990 and creating a plan to meet the future emissions limits, including the establishment of interim limits for 2030 and 2040.

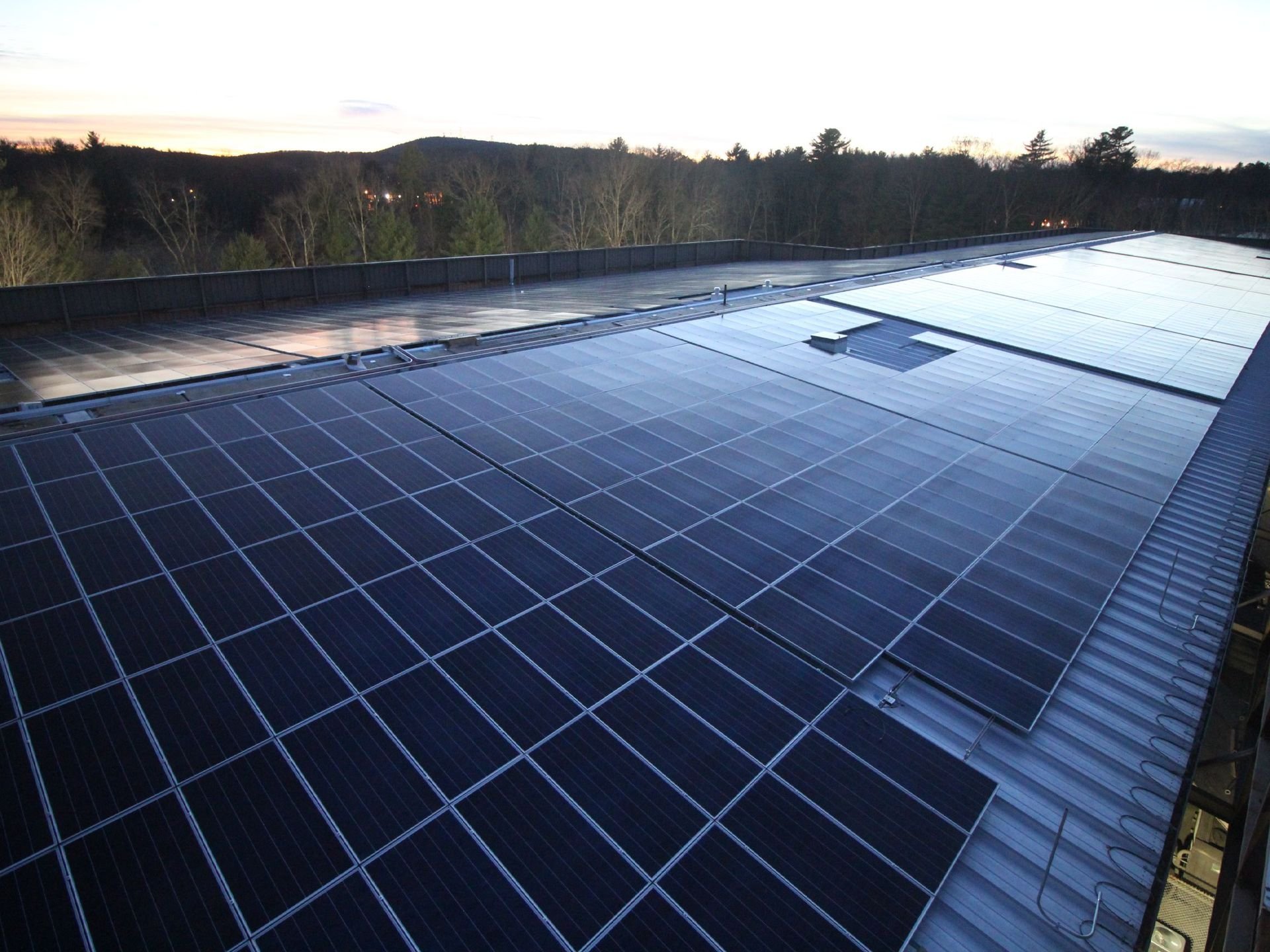
Solar rooftop installation, Sudbury

In December 2019, Massachusetts joined consideration for a multi-state gasoline cap-and-trade program. The plan aims to reduce transportation-related tailpipe emissions, and would levy a tax on fuel companies based on carbon dioxide emissions. The most ambitious version of the plan is projected to reduce the area's tailpipe emissions by 25% between 2022 and 2032. The program is in the public comment phase, with individual states determining whether to participate. The program could begin as early as 2022.

In late 2020, Massachusetts released a Decarbonization Roadmap that aims for net zero greenhouse gas emissions by 2050. The plan calls for major investments in offshore wind and solar energy, heating and cooling upgrades to millions of buildings and would require all new automobiles sold to be zero emissions (electric or hydrogen powered) by 2035.

=== Response by municipalities ===
In addition to state initiatives, several municipalities within Massachusetts have released their own climate action plans, including Boston.

=== Collective buying of electricity ===
The Massachusetts Institute of Technology, Boston Medical Center, and the Post Office Square Redevelopment Corporation bundled their electricity purchasing power in 2016 to finance construction of a 6-megawatt solar farm in North Carolina. The City of Boston is planning a similar initiative with cities across the country.

=== Electricity market legislative timeline ===
- 1997 Restructuring Act - Opened the electricity market to competition and innovation, setting the stage to over 109,000 clean energy jobs in the state today.1997 Restructuring Act (Act 164). 1 July 1997.
- 2008 Green Communities Act - Created the Green Communities Program, aimed at providing financial assistance for efficiency and conservation projects at the municipal level. To qualify, a municipality must agree to a streamlined permitting process for new renewable projects and meet other benchmarks.2008 Green Communities Act (Act 169). 1 July 2008.
- 2016 Energy Diversity Act - Signed into law on August 8, 2016. Sets procurements for 1600 megawatts of offshore wind. These represent the largest purchase of clean energy in the Commonwealth's history.2016 Energy Diversity Act (Act 188). 1 July 2016.
- Implementation of the 2016 Energy Diversity Act - On August 2, 2018, the electric utility companies signed contracts for an 800-megawatt offshore wind farm to be built by Vineyard Wind at a levelized price of 6.5 cents a kilowatt hour for 20 years. The offshore wind farm will result in 3,600 jobs in the region during the construction phase and has a 2021 in-service date. 2016 Energy Diversity Act (Act 188). 1 July 2016.

== See also ==
- Solar power in Massachusetts
- Wind power in Massachusetts
- List of power stations in Massachusetts
- Plug-in electric vehicles in Massachusetts
