= Wind power in Massachusetts =

Electricity from wind in one U.S. state

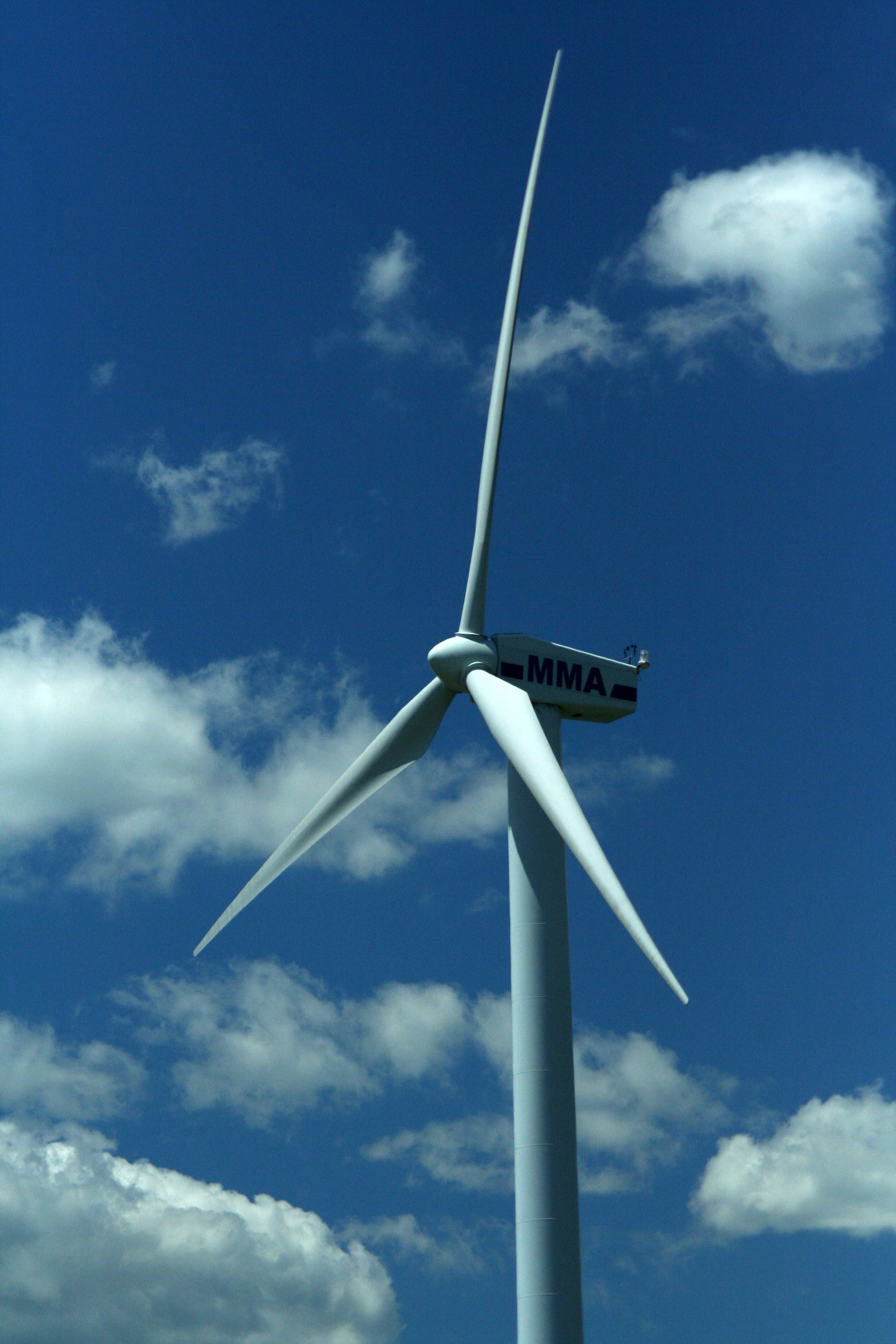
Massachusetts Maritime Academy wind turbine

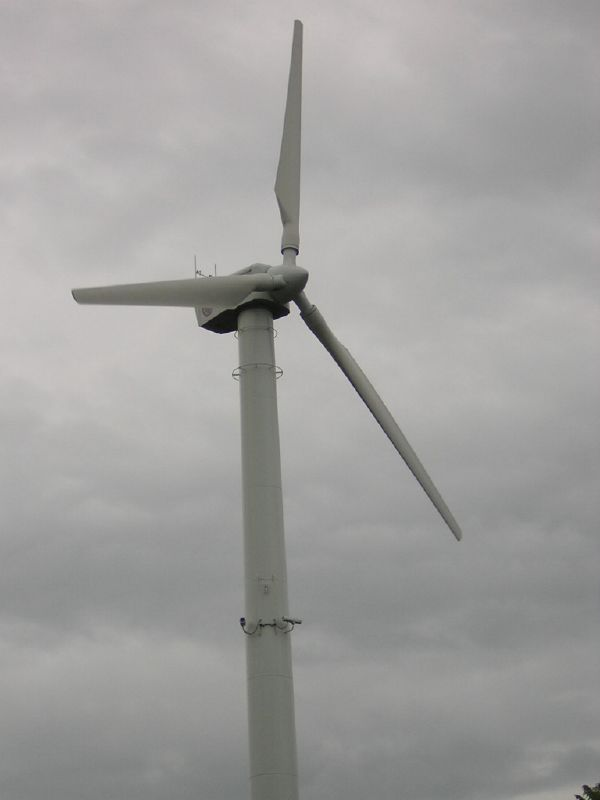
IBEW wind turbine along I-93

The U.S. state of Massachusetts has vast wind energy resources offshore, as well as significant resources onshore. After courts blocked the Trump administration's attempt to shut it down, the offshore Vineyard Wind I project was completed in March 2026 and has been supplying power to the New England grid.

The 2016 update to the states's Clean Energy and Climate Plan had a goal of reducing 1990 baseline greenhouse gas emissions levels by 25% by 2020. Current goals include installing 3,500 megawatts (MW) of offshore wind power in the state by 2035. However, as of Q4 2021, the state had only 120 MW of wind powered electricity generating capacity, responsible for generating 0.9% of in-state electricity production. The state has awarded contracts to two offshore projects, the 800 MW Vineyard Wind project and 804 MW Mayflower Wind project. Construction began on the Vineyard Wind 1 project on November 18, 2021, after a long fight for approval. Commonwealth Wind was selected for development in 2021, but the developer has attempted to cancel the project due to increased costs. There are eight projects planned for off the southern coast of Massachusetts, though some will deliver power to Rhode Island, Connecticut, and New York.

== Notable onshore projects ==
Installed in 2005, the International Brotherhood of Electrical Workers (IBEW) 100 kW wind turbine along I-93 south of Boston drew attention to wind power to tens of thousands of commuters. In 2009, a similar wind turbine was installed along I93 north of Boston, in Medford, expected to generate 170,000 kWh/year.

A GE Wind Energy 1.5 MW turbine was the first wind turbine to be installed at a ski resort in the United States of America at Jiminy Peak in Hancock, MA. The turbine, installed in 2007, is visible from many of the slopes on the mountain and it produces 4,600 MWh annually, about one third of the facilities electricity demands.

At the Joint Base Cape Cod three turbines generate power for the base and construction is underway for two additional 1.68 MW turbines to power the radar unit. The three, soon to be five, turbines are highly visible from both the Bourne Bridge and the Sagamore Bridge looking to the East. The turbines have resulted in significant savings for the base, the turbines also do not generate any controversy because they are located well within the base boundaries far from civilian homes.

In June 2017, the Massachusetts courts shut down two town-owned 1.65-megawatt wind turbines in Falmouth, Massachusetts after a long legal battle. A handful of neighboring residents alleged the turbines decreased their property values, and they claimed they caused sleep disturbances, headaches and other ailments. Several neighbors describe the noise as "torture." The Town of Falmouth in November 2019 approved 2.5 million to disassemble and store the wind turbines. The turbines were designed in the late 1990s and have the original gearboxes and blades.

== Offshore wind ==
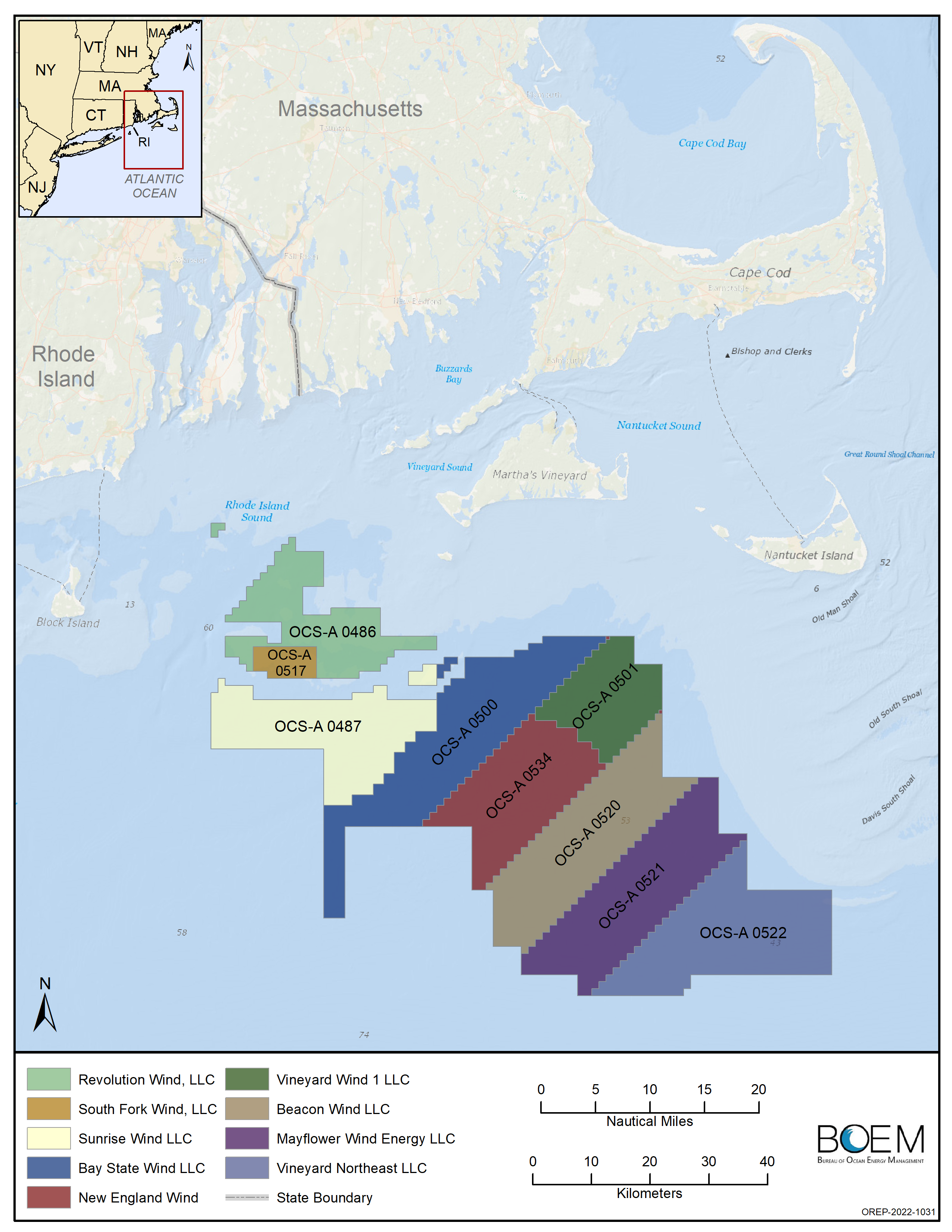
Wind energy lease areas off the southern coasts of Massachusetts and Rhode Island as of October 2022

Cape Wind was an offshore wind farm that would have produced 450 MW, enough electricity to power nearly 420,000 homes using 130 wind turbines, The project made its first federal filings in 2001, and faced a lengthy federal, state, and municipal permitting processes and considerable local controversy because of its location (in federal waters) between Cape Cod, Nantucket, and Martha's Vineyard, within sight of the mainland. It was cancelled in 2017 after losing utility support.

On August 8, 2016 the Massachusetts governor signed Bill H.4568 which mandates that Massachusetts utilities obtain 1.6 GW of offshore wind power by 2027. Policy also mandated that utilities acquire 1.2 GW of power from other renewable sources, including onshore wind.

On December 14, 2018, the U.S. Bureau of Ocean Energy Management (BOEM) opened bids for leases on three parcels, each 13,000 acres, located in federal waters south of Martha's Vineyard and Nantucket. The three tentative winners, subject to final negotiations, were:

- Beacon Wind, jointly owned by BP and Equinor Wind US, a division of the Norwegian oil company Equinor, formerly Statoil
- Mayflower Wind Energy, LLC, jointly owned by Shell and EDP Renewables
- Vineyard Wind, LLC, jointly owned by Copenhagen Infrastructure Partners and Avangrid Renewables

The auction raised a total of $405 million. The three areas could support 4.1 gigawatts of wind nameplate power, according to BOEM estimates.

In April 2019, Vineyard Wind was awarded a contract to supply 800 MW of power to Massachusetts utilities at a price of 8.9 cents/kWh and will also spend $15 million on battery systems for energy storage. They plan to install 84 turbines, with their power line running between the Vineyard and Nantucket to Covell Beach in Centerville, and from there via land to the grid. The vessels used must comply with the Jones Act. Final major federal approval was granted on May 11, 2021. Power from the first turbine started flowing into the ISO New England grid on January 2, 2024. Construction was completed in March 2026 with 62 turbines.

Commonwealth Wind (lease area OCS-A 0534) was selected for development in 2021, and signed agreements with all three major Massachusetts electric utilities - Eversource, National Grid, and Unitil. In 2022, developer Avangrid asked that its project be canceled and rebid due to higher supply costs. The Massachusetts Department of Public Utilities rejected this request and approved the Commonwealth Wind and Mayflower Wind agreements instead. A Mayflower Wind cable is expected to come ashore at the site of the former coal-powered Brayton Point Power Station, which already has transmission infrastructure.

The Park City Wind project would supply power to Connecticut but land cables in Barnstable on Cape Cod. Avangrid attempted to renegotiate its agreement with Connecticut due to cost increases.

The proposed offshore Bay State Wind project failed to arrange purchasing agreements in Massachusetts. The joint venture between Eversource and Ørsted proposed a new design called Revolution Wind 2, to supply clean electricity to Rhode Island Energy. As of March 2026, the project was producing power and about 60 of its 65 turbines were in place.

== Current state support ==
The state has implemented policy and infrastructure to support efforts to reduce greenhouse gas emissions. These policies and infrastructure are partially focused on promoting on- and off-shore wind power.

=== Policy ===
- Green Communities Act (2008): created a commission to provide technical and financial support to reduce energy costs, strengthen local economies, and support renewable energy efforts.
- Green Jobs Act (2008): created the Massachusetts Clean Energy Center (MassCEC), which is a state authority designated for "job development and economic development in the clean energy sector." The Act created the Alternative and Clean Energy Investment Trust Fund to further this economic development.
- Global Warming Solutions Act (2008): requires reduction in 1990 greenhouse gas emission levels to 25% by 2020, and at least an 80% reduction by 2050. Policy information and figures depicting state progress can be viewed on the Mass.gov website.

=== New Bedford Marine Commerce Terminal ===
The New Bedford Marine Commerce Terminal is the first hub in the country designed for the deployment of offshore wind farms. The terminal is managed by the Massachusetts Clean Energy Center which supports the fabrication and implementation of offshore wind projects and the transportation of large scale marine cargo. The Terminal contains 26 acres of storage space that can be used by businesses and to aid shipping and transportation. Besides the auxiliary I-195 interstate running directly through New Bedford's downtown, it also has access roads to two highways, I-495 and I-95, and is accessible from other ports.

=== Wind Technology Testing Center ===
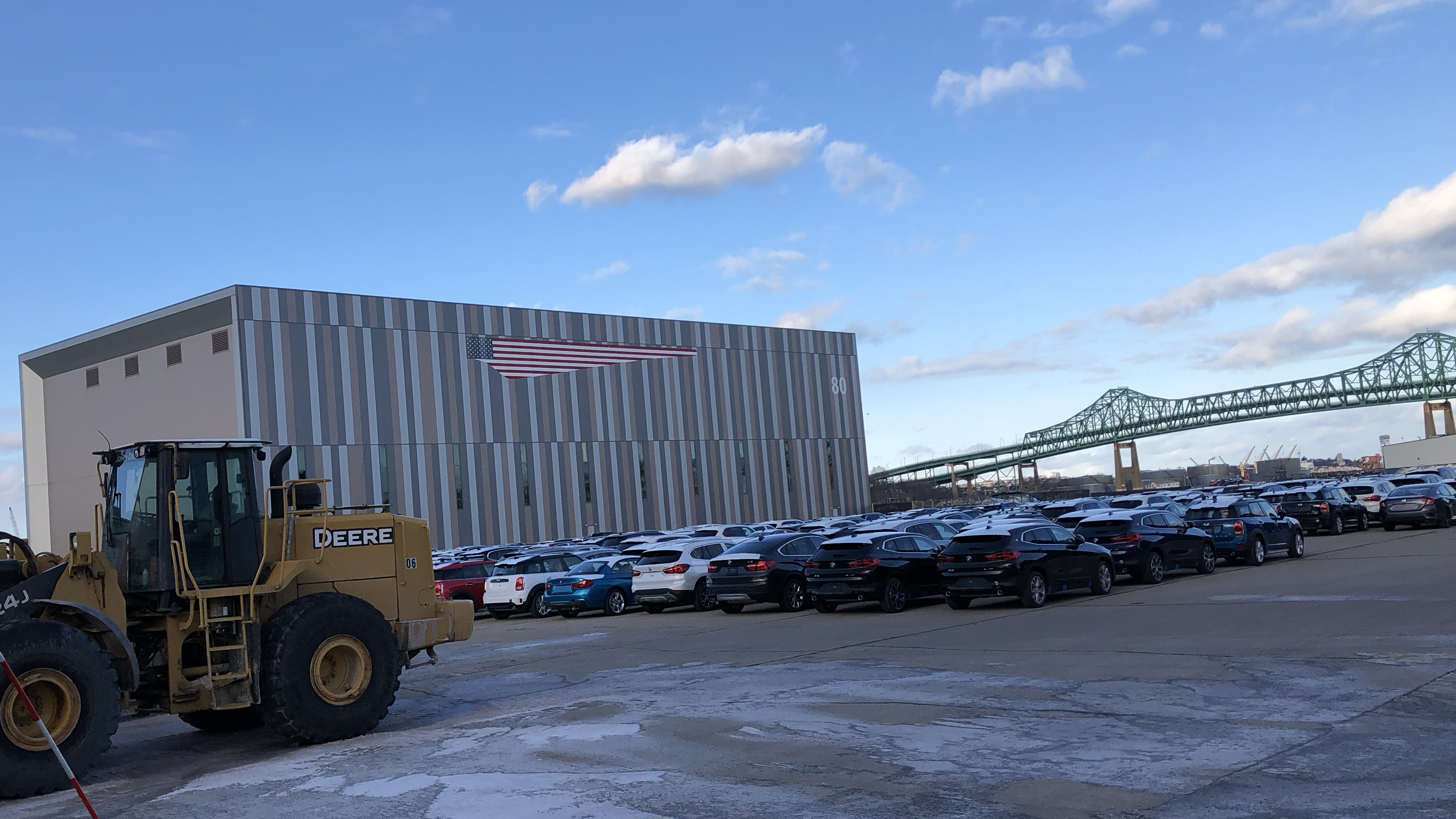
Massachusetts Wind Technology Testing Center

The Massachusetts Wind Technology Testing Center (WTTC) in Charlestown is managed by the Massachusetts Clean Energy Center. The center offers testing for blades up to 90 meters long and different prototyping methods in order to support the production and installation of land and offshore wind turbines. The blade testing is required for turbines to meet international qualifications and to be certified for use.

=== Charlie Baker administration (2015–2023) ===
In July 2015, the administration of Massachusetts Governor Charlie Baker announced that Baker filed legislation to require the state to procure 1,600 megawatts of offshore wind power, as well as 1,200 megawatts of hydropower. In March 2016, the legislation received the endorsement of all three of the Energy and Environmental Affairs Secretaries of the Deval Patrick administration, and the following August, Baker signed the legislation into law. In September 2016, Baker's administration announced that the offshore wind companies Deepwater Wind, DONG Energy, and OffshoreMW agreed to use the New Bedford Marine Commerce Terminal built during the Patrick administration as a staging area for their projects. In June 2017, Massachusetts utilities issued the first RFP under the energy diversification law signed by Baker in August 2016, and the following month, five major bids were submitted.

In May 2018, Baker's administration selected Vineyard Wind to construct an 800-megawatt offshore wind farm off the southern coast of Martha's Vineyard, and the following October, Vineyard Wind announced that it had signed an 18-month lease to also conduct their staging operations at the New Bedford Marine Commerce Terminal. In December 2018, the Bureau of Ocean Energy Management announced the sale of three wind lease plots of 390,000 acres of ocean south of Nantucket and Martha's Vineyard to Equinor Wind, Mayflower Wind, and Vineyard Wind for a national record of $405 million that the agency estimated could generate as much as 4,100 megawatts of wind power. In May 2021, the U.S. Department of the Interior announced that a record of decision had been issued giving final federal approval for the Vineyard Wind project.

An Offshore Wind Study published in mid-2020 analyzed procuring an additional 1.6 GW of off-shore capacity in addition to the 1.6 GW already in progress.

In late 2020, the Baker Administration released a Decarbonization Roadmap that aims for net zero greenhouse gas emissions by 2050. The plan calls for major investments in offshore wind and solar energy.

== Capacity ==

=== Installed ===
The following table shows the growth in wind power installed nameplate capacity in MW for Massachusetts since 1999.

Year	Amount (MW)	Change (MW)	% change
1999	0.3	0	
2000	0.3	0	0%
2001	1	0.7	233%
2002	1	0	0%
2003	1	0	0%
2004	1	0	0%
2005	1.1	0.1	10%
2006	3.5	2.4	218%
2007	5	1.5	43%
2008	5.7	0.7	14%
2009	15	9	163%
2010	17.7	2.7	18%
2011	47	29.3	166%
2012	103	56	119%
2013	106	3	3%
2014	107	1	1%
2015	107	0	0%
2016	115	8	7%
2017	115	0	0%
2018	113	-2	-2%
2019	120	7	6%
2020	120	0	0%

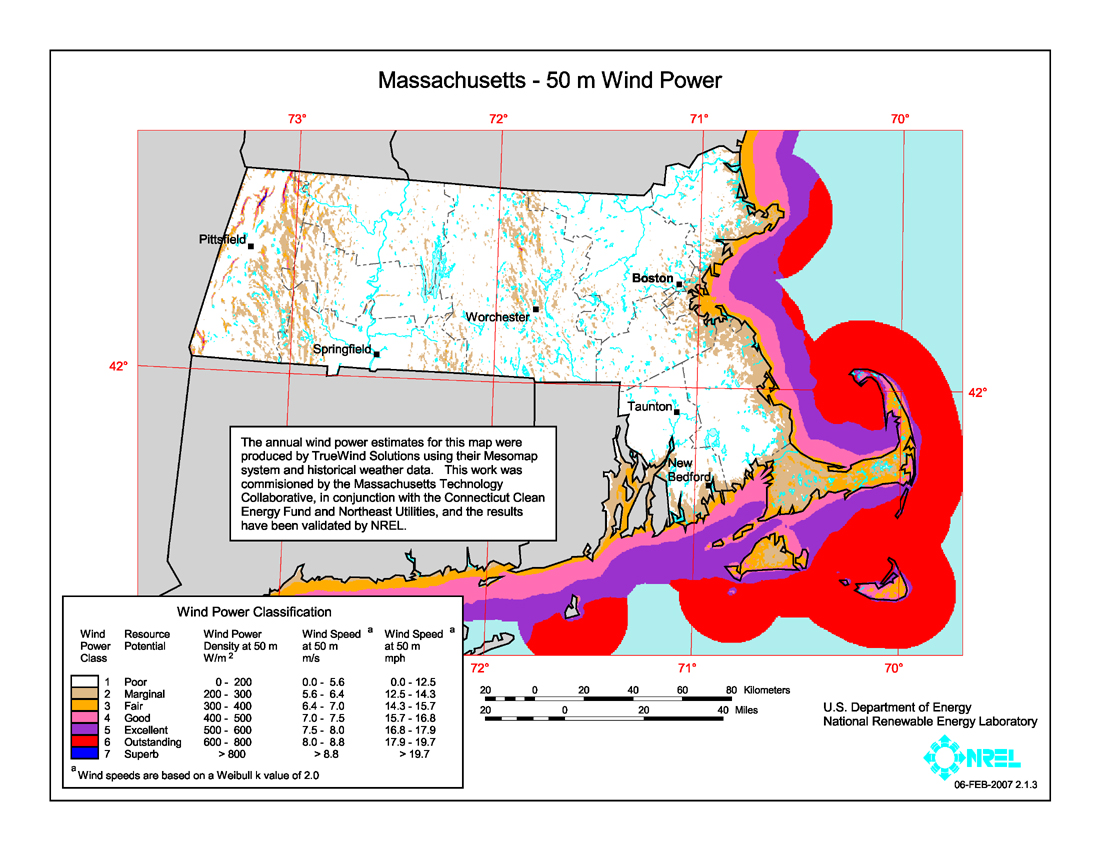
Offshore wind power capacity

=== Potential ===
In early 2010, the National Renewable Energy Laboratory released the first comprehensive update of wind energy potential by state since 1993, showing that Massachusetts had potential to install 1,028 MW of onshore wind power, using 80 meter high wind turbines, and 1,913 MW of 100 MW wind turbines could achieve 30% or better capacity factor - and of those, almost 500 MW could reach a capacity factor of 40%.

=== Locations ===
In 2009, the Massachusetts Department of Energy Resources (DOER) contracted Navigant Consulting to determine new locations of potential wind turbine sites throughout the state. The study identified 44 locations with 947 MW of potential power. The locations are centrally focused in the Berkshire and Barnstable counties. The Massachusetts Executive Office of Energy and Environmental Affairs has this information publicly available with a Wind Energy Site Screening Tool.

== Imports ==
To meet renewable power minimums and with state approval, Massachusetts utilities agreed to pay for 40% of the output of the proposed King Pine wind farm in Aroostook County, Maine developed by Longroad Energy. As of January 2023 was approved by the Maine Public Utilities Commission but required further design and approval of the transmission line developed by LS Power of New York.

== See also ==
- Renewable energy in the United States
- Solar power in Massachusetts
- Wind power in the United States
- List of offshore wind farms in the United States
- Anbaric Development Partners
- Cape Wind
- ISO New England
- SouthCoast Wind
- Vineyard Power Co-operative
