= Vineyard Power Co-operative =

Vineyard Power Co-operative is "a community owned renewable energy co-operative based on the island of Martha's Vineyard, Massachusetts."

Vineyard Power develops local renewable energy projects and plans to assist the island of Martha's Vineyard to meet the energy goals of the Island Plan, and work towards a 100% renewable energy supply. The founding of Vineyard Power was inspired by the renewable energy vision of the people of Samso island in Denmark.

== Wind power ==
Offshore wind development is another of the motivations for creating the Vineyard Power Co-op, with the recognition this energy source would need community support. The National Renewable Energy Lab (NREL) classifies the sound and ocean around Martha's Vineyard to be "Excellent" (between 7.5 and 8 meters per second (m/s) in regard to energy generation potential, at 50 meters altitude) or "Outstanding" (between 8.0 and 8.8 m/s). The first proposal for offshore wind in the area, known as Cape Wind, created significant opposition focused on the lack of community involvement, and visual impacts. https://www.nrel.gov/news/program/2011/1437.html That project obtained a lease for development in Federal waters six miles from land in Nantucket Sound.

Vineyard Power organized public input into the planning wind farm development off the southern shores of the island, with OffshoreMW, and Bureau of Ocean Energy Management, Regulation and Enforcement (BOEMRE). This collaboration began as the Martha's Vineyard Offshore Wind Alliance (MVOWA) in 2011. The Vineyard Power Co-op signed a Community Benefits Agreement with that one developer to formalize this arrangement for mutual benefit, and to pursue better community input and economic development for the people of Martha's Vineyard. The development is now called Vineyard Wind. The permitting process for this offshore windfarm is underway.

== Solar power ==
During the years when the federal process for offshore wind development moved slowly, the co-op identified opportunities to develop solar projects on the island. The first of these were solar canopies in the parking lot at the locally owned supermarket. Benefits for more citizens came through building solar on town-owned landfills. Town of Aquinnah chose the company, after an RFP, for a solar plant. Construction was started and completed in 2012. The most recent solar project completed is on the roof of the Boys and Girls Club.

== See also ==
- Vineyard Wind
- Mayflower Wind
- Energy law § United States

== 100% renewable energy ==
The co-op promotes planning and practices that reduce fossil fuel use and the replacement with renewable electricity. The first solar canopies built by the co-op include electric vehicle chargers. The co-op continues to support electric vehicle adoption. Leaders of island organizations met in September 2017 at the initiative of the co-op and Environment Massachusetts to develop a vision of 100% renewable energy use for the island.
