= Port of New Bedford =

Coordinates: 41°37′25″N 70°55′0″W

The Port of New Bedford, or the New Bedford Harbor, is a deepwater port located at the mouth of the Acushnet River on Buzzards Bay, with access to the Atlantic Ocean. It is in the harbor estuary on the southern coast of Massachusetts in New Bedford, Fairhaven and Acushnet.

Once a major whaling port, it is the largest commercial fishing port by value in the United States. It also handles breakbulk cargo. In the 21st century it is becoming an offshore wind port. The port is part of Foreign Trade Zone (FTZ #28), which also includes New Bedford Regional Airport.

== Geography ==
=== Waterways and lighthouses ===
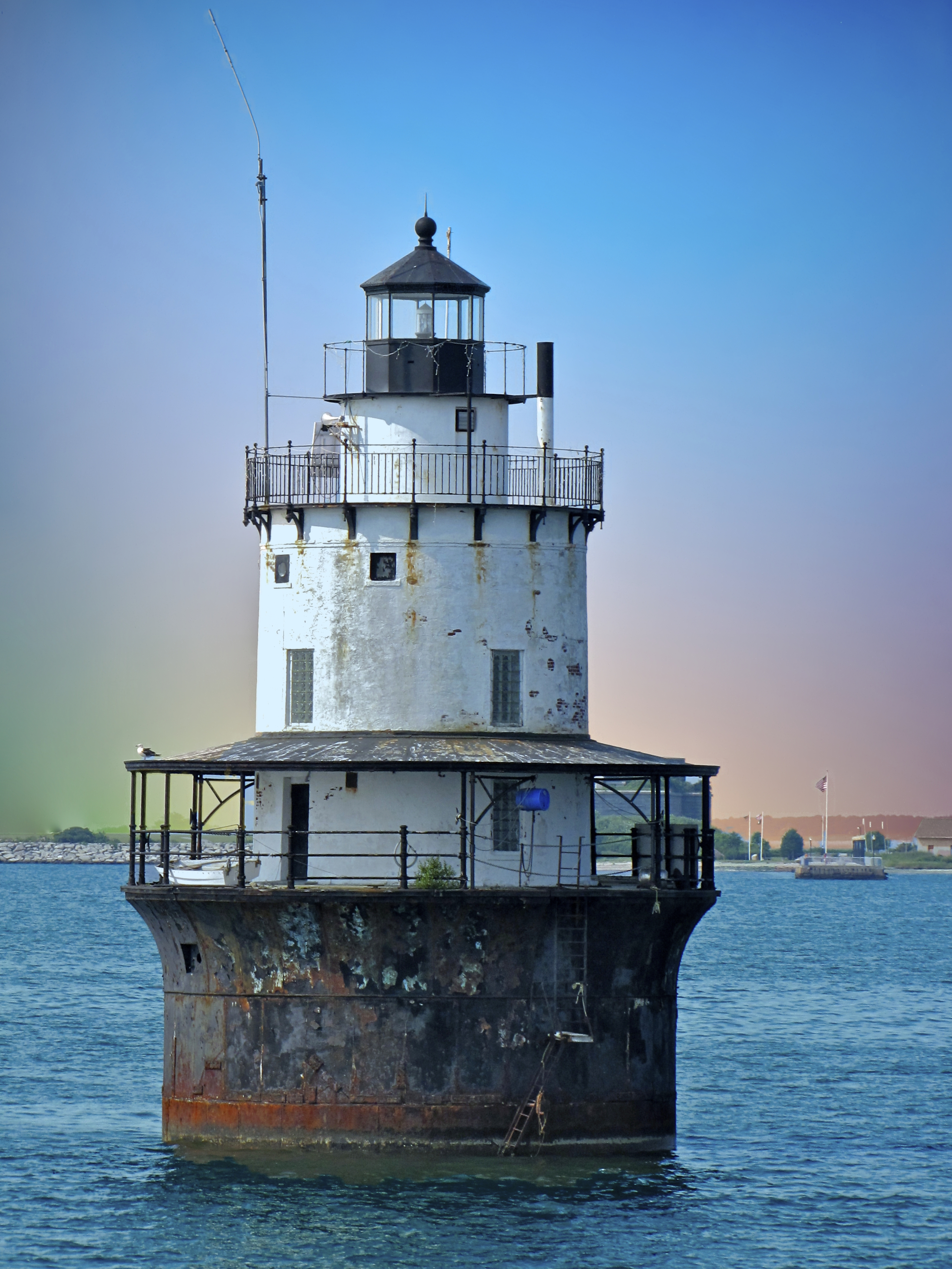
Butler's Flat Lighthouse

The port is at the estuary of the Acushnet River where it empties into Buzzards Bay and beyond that the Atlantic. It is approximately nine nautical miles from the Cape Cod Canal.

To the west of Clark's Point, site of Clarks Point Light is Clark's Cove, which extends landward approximately one and a half mile from the bay.

The Butler Flats Light is located in the outer harbor. Crow Island is in the middle harbor.

=== Environmental remediation and dredging ===
The harbor has ongoing environmental remediation through dredging and capping, largely focusing on removal of PCBs released into it during between the 1940s and 1970s.

=== Road and rail ===
The New Bedford – Fairhaven Bridge carries U.S. Route 6 across the port at the north where it travels over Fish Island and Pope's Island. Between the two islands lies the central section of the bridge with a swing span that allows maritime passage to the upper harbor. Massachusetts Route 18 provides access to Interstate 195 and Massachusetts Route 24 via Massachusetts Route 140

Massachusetts Coastal Railroad provides service to the port along the New Bedford Subdivision with connections to the national rail network via CSX Middleboro Secondary.

=== Hurricane barrier ===
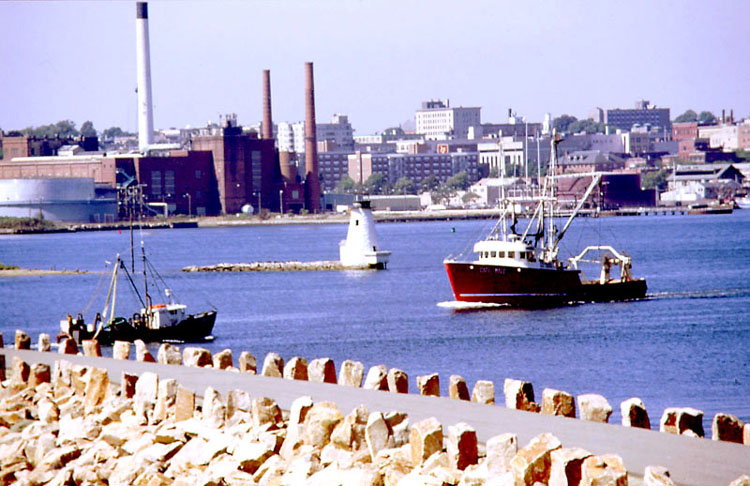
Harbor from the barrier

Just south of Palmer's Island, beginning near Fort Phoenix in Fairhaven, is the harbor's hurricane barrier, built by the Army Corps of Engineers in the 1960s. It is 9,100 feet long and twenty feet above median sea level, and is the largest stone structure on the East Coast. The harbor section has two 440-ton gates in the center that can be closed to protect the port during strong tides or storm surges. A walkway allows for pedestrian access. In 2020, it was struck by a ship departing the harbor.

== Whaling ==
The port was once the epicenter of the whaling industry in the US. In the mid-1700s the port had become a whaling port and shipbuilding center. The Dartmouth, was launched in 1767. By the early 19th century, the port was one of the leading whaling ports in the world. In 1848, Lewis Temple invented a new type of harpoon that revolutionized the whaling industry, the city had significant control over whaling products used around the world, and it soon became one of the richest cities in the world. More than half of the United States' whaling fleet of over 700 vessels was registered at the Port of New Bedford, which played a prominent role in Herman Melville's Moby Dick. In the whaling disaster of 1871, 22 whalers from the port were lost off the coast of Alaska. in 1914, J. & W. R. Wing Company sent out its last whaleship in 1914. The last whaling expedition left the port in 1925. The era is memorialized at the New Bedford Whaling Museum.

== Fishing ==
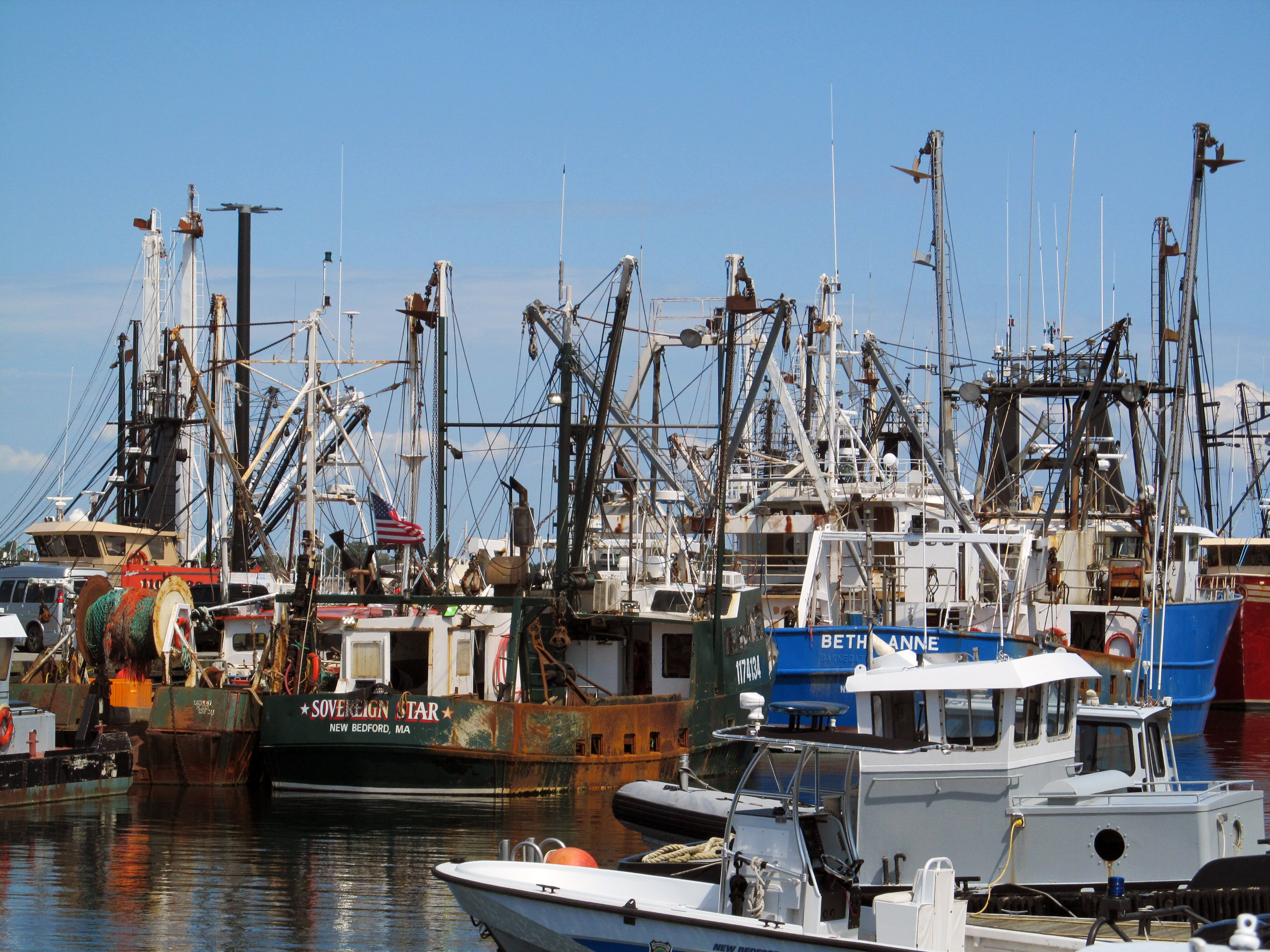
The fishing fleet

The port has been the fishing port with the highest value of fish landed in the United States since 2001. There are several piers which service the fish and seafood industry. Two are listed on Merrill's Wharf Historic District.

=== South Terminal ===
South Terminal has over 25 acres (10 ha) of marine industrial land, with a 1,600 linear foot (490 m) bulkhead and depths of 20 feet (6.1 m), for offloading fish and seafood directly into the on-site processing plants where they are filleted, cleaned, and weighed, for shipment by truck and air freight.

Pier	Linear feet of berthing space	Number of Berths	Number of Vessels	Notes
Steamship Pier	1,300	15	50	NRHP
Leonard's	950	12	40	
Fisherman's	940	9	30	
Homer's Wharf	850	12	30	
Coal Pocket Pier	260	4	10	NRHP

== Terminals ==
=== New Bedford Marine Commerce Terminal ===
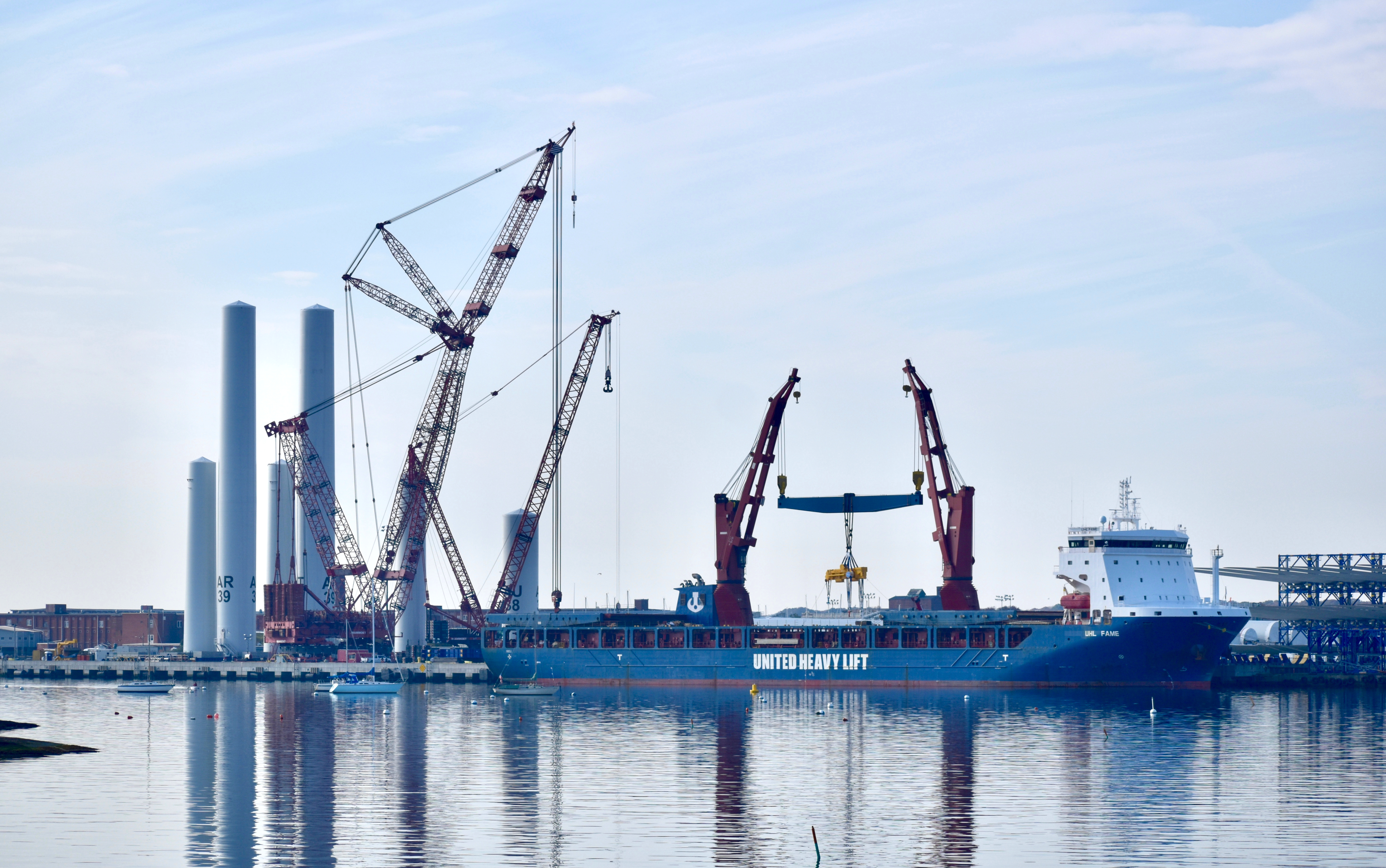
Marine Commerce Terminal during construction of Vineyard Wind 1.

The New Bedford Marine Commerce Terminal is an offshore wind port under development by the Massachusetts Clean Energy Center (Mass CEC). Since the ISO/IEC 17025 accredited Wind Technology Testing Center opened in 2011, the laboratory has run 35 blade testing programmes and hundreds of individual blade tests. The quay site is being developed as the assembly area for the Mayflower Wind and Vineyard Wind projects.

=== Foss Marine Terminal ===
The New Bedford Foss Marine Terminal is a planned new offshore wind facility to be built at the site of the New Bedford Gas and Edison Light Complex.

=== North Terminal ===
The New Bedford North Terminal on the Acushnet River is being redeveloped. It has dockside connections to the rail network.

=== State Pier ===
State Pier houses the terminals for Seastreak ferries to the islands of Nantucket and Martha's Vineyard and the ferry to Cuttyhunk Island. There are plans to add offshore wind crew transfer and operations facility.

== See also ==
- United States Customs District of New Bedford
- USNS New Bedford
- List of ports in the United States
