= Solar power in Massachusetts =

Overview of solar power in the U.S. state of Massachusetts

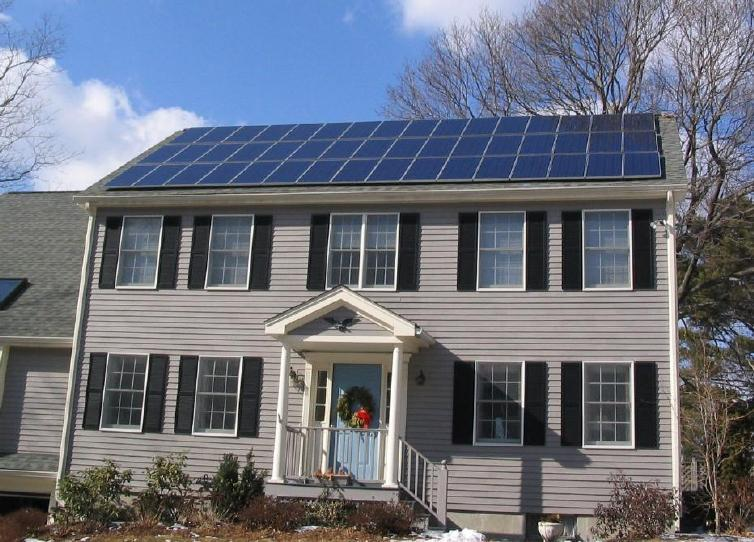
Photovoltaics on a house near Boston

Solar power in Massachusetts has been increasing rapidly, due to Section 1603 grants for installations that began before December 31, 2011, and the sale of SRECs for $0.30/kWh, which allows payback for the system within 5 or 6 years, and generates income for the life of the system. For systems installed after December 31, 2011, and before December 31, 2016, the 30% tax grant becomes a 30% tax credit. There was an appeal to the Congress to extend the 1603 program, the grant program, for an additional year.

Net metering is available with no aggregate limit for systems less than 10 kW, or three phase connected systems less than 25 kW. Larger systems are limited to 3% of total peak load. Approximately 40 municipalities are exempt from net metering. Of these, most choose not to offer it.

The first solar park in the country is the 100 kW array installed in 1981 at Beverly High School. The largest campus to have a solar program is Harvard's 555 kW array.

Massachusetts' largest privately owned solar array is the 7.1 MW Happy Hollow Community Solar and Storage Farm, completed in March 2019. The town of Harvard, Massachusetts has the most solar installations, with 75 planned, of which 21 have been installed. Holyoke is home to two arrays which total 4.5 MW which were completed on December 20, 2011. A 1.8 MW solar farm in Pittsfield was completed in 2010. A 5.75 MW solar park in Canton was completed in 2012. Two 6 MW solar parks are being built, one in Berkley, and the other in Carver. As of August 2012, a total of 129 MW had been installed in the state.

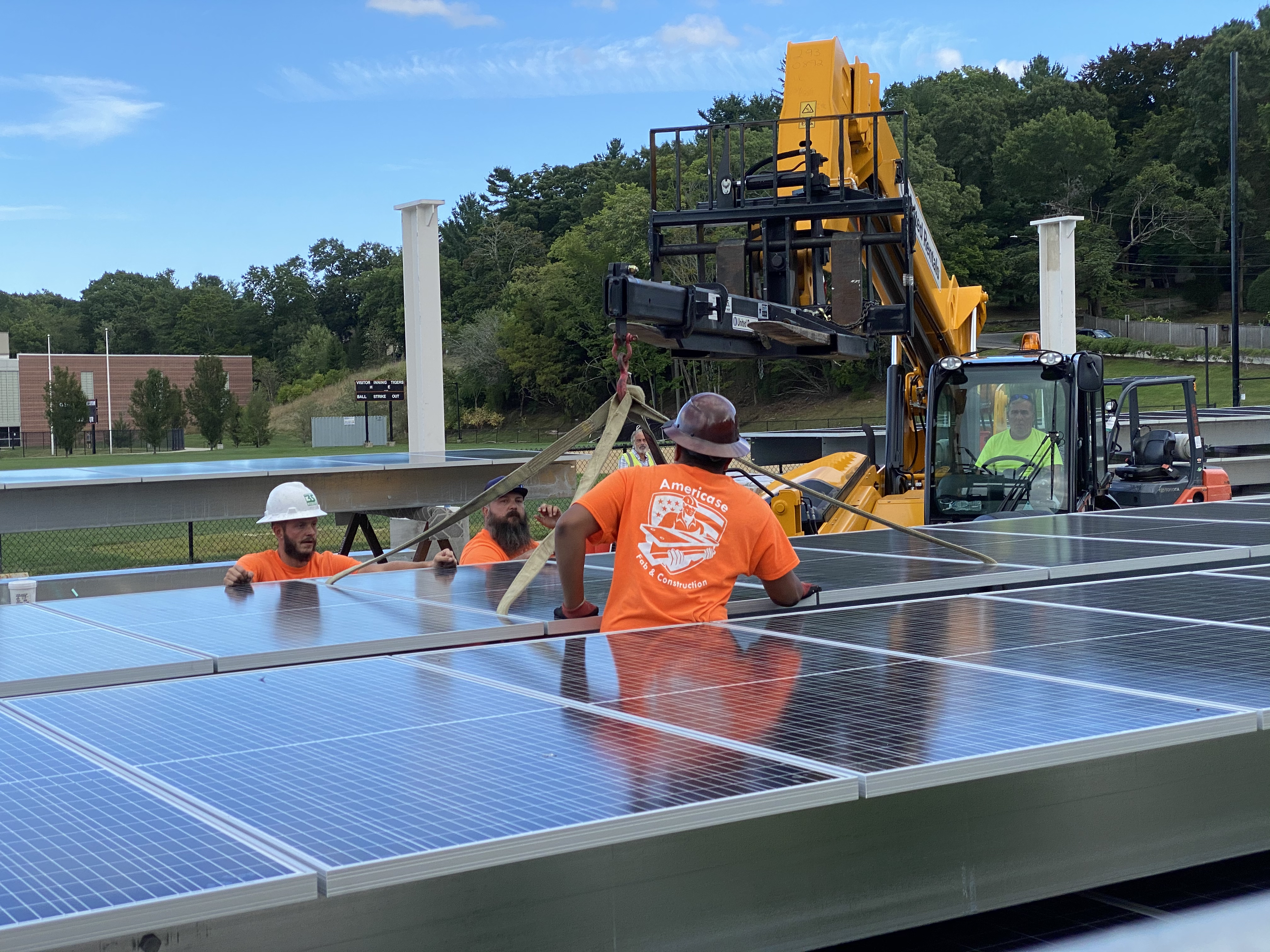
Solar installation, Newton North High School

State officials had set a target of installing 250 MW of solar PV statewide by 2017, and in May 2013 upped the target to 1,600 MW by 2020, as the 250 MW goal had been met four years ahead of schedule. Exceeding projections again, cumulative solar PV capacity in the state reached over 2 GW (2,000 MW) at the end of 2017. The American Solar Energy Industries Association forecasts that another ~1.5 GW of solar PV would be installed in the state over the four years from 2018 to 2021.

The U.S. Energy Information Administration meanwhile reports that solar power, including both utility-scale and small-scale projects, accounted for 7.7% of the electricity generated in Massachusetts in 2017 - the 5th highest percentage nationwide among the 50 states.

Massachusetts has a robust program for solar on closed landfills, with more than 80 projects with over 250 MW of capacity.

== Charlie Baker administration (2015–2023) ==
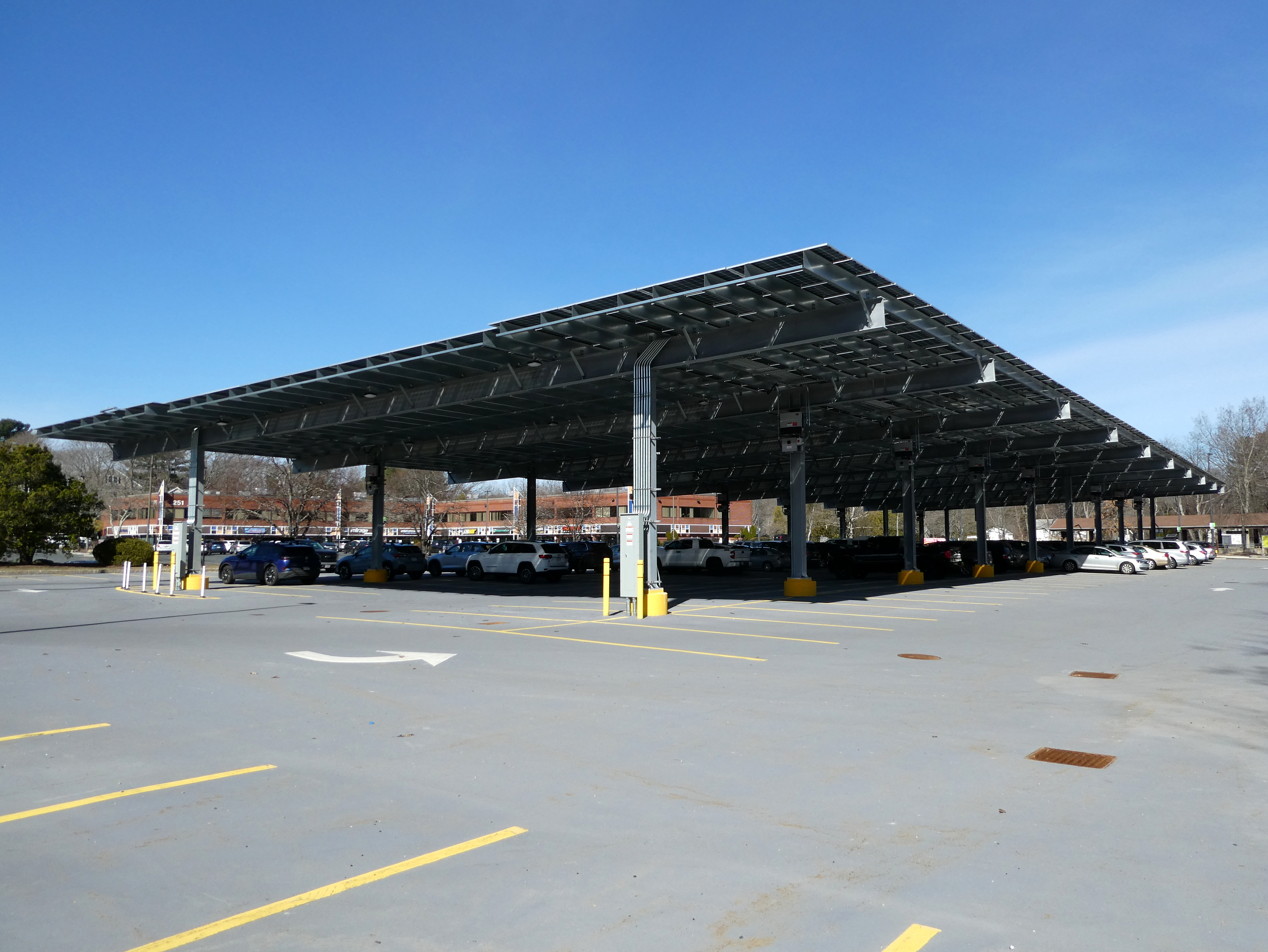
Solar panels at West Natick station parking lot

In July 2015, the administration of Massachusetts Governor Charlie Baker announced that Baker would file legislation to raise net metering caps on solar energy, with officials stating that "The administration looks forward to filing legislation that builds upon the success and continued growth of Massachusetts' solar industry while ensuring a long-term, sustainable solar program that facilitates industry growth, minimizes ratepayer impact and achieves our goal of 1,600 megawatts by 2020". The administration submitted the legislation the following month, and on April 11, 2016, Baker signed the legislation into law. The cap increase prompted a subsequent overhaul the following year of the state's solar incentive program that cut the cost of solar installations to ratepayers in half.

In December 2015, Baker's administration launched a $30 million residential solar loan program to increase direct ownership of solar electricity by lowering fixed interest rates to homeowners purchasing solar panels, with Baker himself stating "Massachusetts is a national leader in solar energy, and this program provides another way for residents to access solar energy while diversifying the Commonwealth's energy portfolio and reducing our overall carbon footprint". In January 2018, when President Trump imposed tariffs on solar panels manufactured outside the United States, Baker's administration criticized the decision, stating that it was "disappointed" but "remains committed to supporting solar energy as an important component of the Commonwealth's diverse energy portfolio and source of clean energy jobs." In February 2018, Baker's administration announced that solar capacity in Massachusetts had increased to 2,000 megawatts.

In late 2020, the Baker Administration released a Decarbonization Roadmap that aims for net zero greenhouse gas emissions by 2050. The plan calls for major investments in solar energy, along with offshore wind, which is considered complimentary.

== Statistics ==
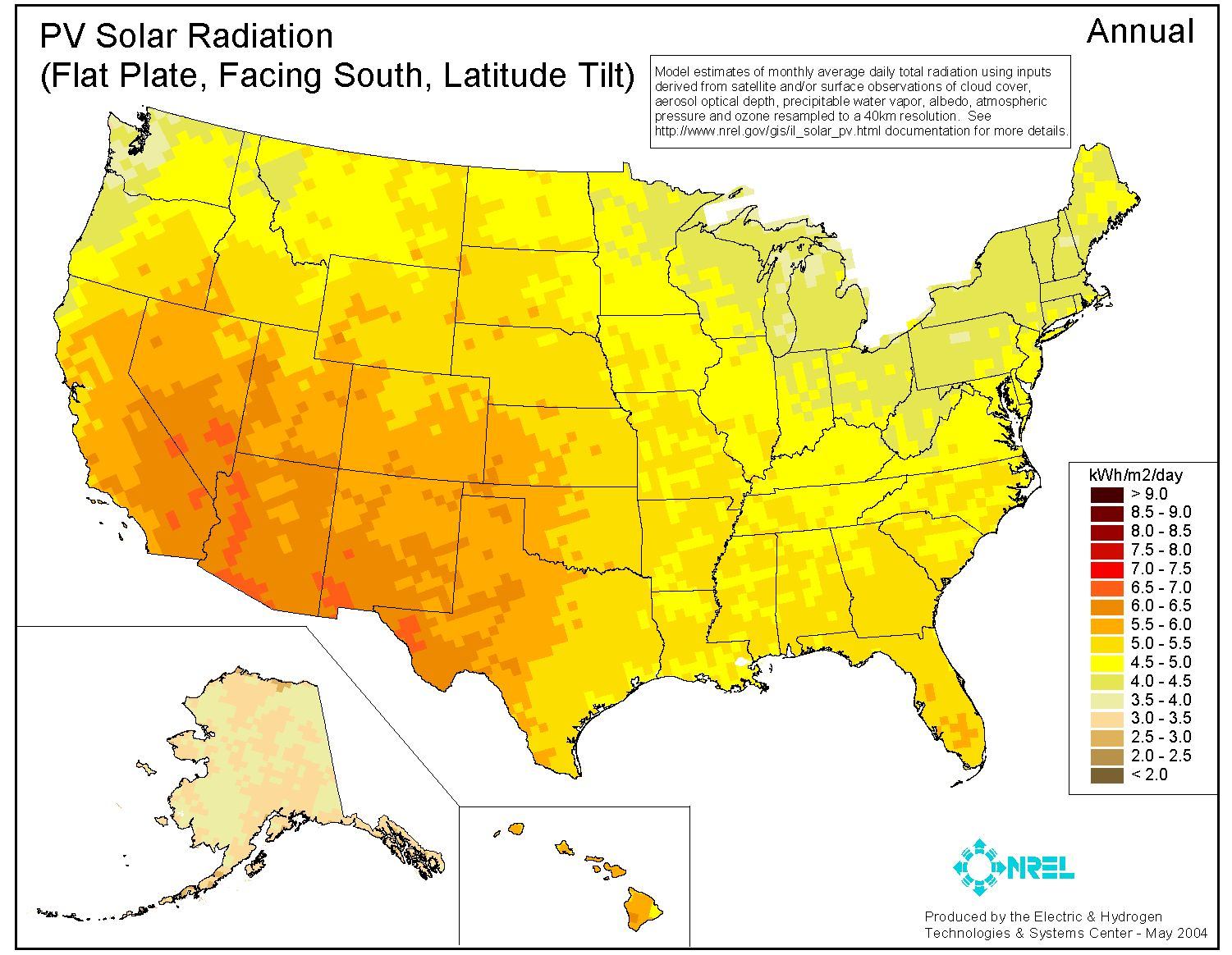
Average solar insolation

=== Potential generation ===
The average insolation in Massachusetts is about four sun hours per day, and ranges from less than two in the winter to over five in the summer.

Massachusetts electricity consumption in 2015 was 54,621 million kWh (54.6 TWh). The state is a net importer of electricity, having only generated 32,086 million kWh (32.0 TWh) that year. Massachusetts has the potential for generating 799,344 million kWh/year (799.3 TWh/y) from 184,076 MW (0.184 TW) of offshore wind farms and 82,205 million kWh (82.2 TWh) from 51,568 MW (0.052 TW) of photovoltaic solar farms, and 26,000 million kWh (26 TWh) (47% of consumption) from 22,500 MW (0.023 TW) of rooftop photovoltaics.

=== Installed capacity ===
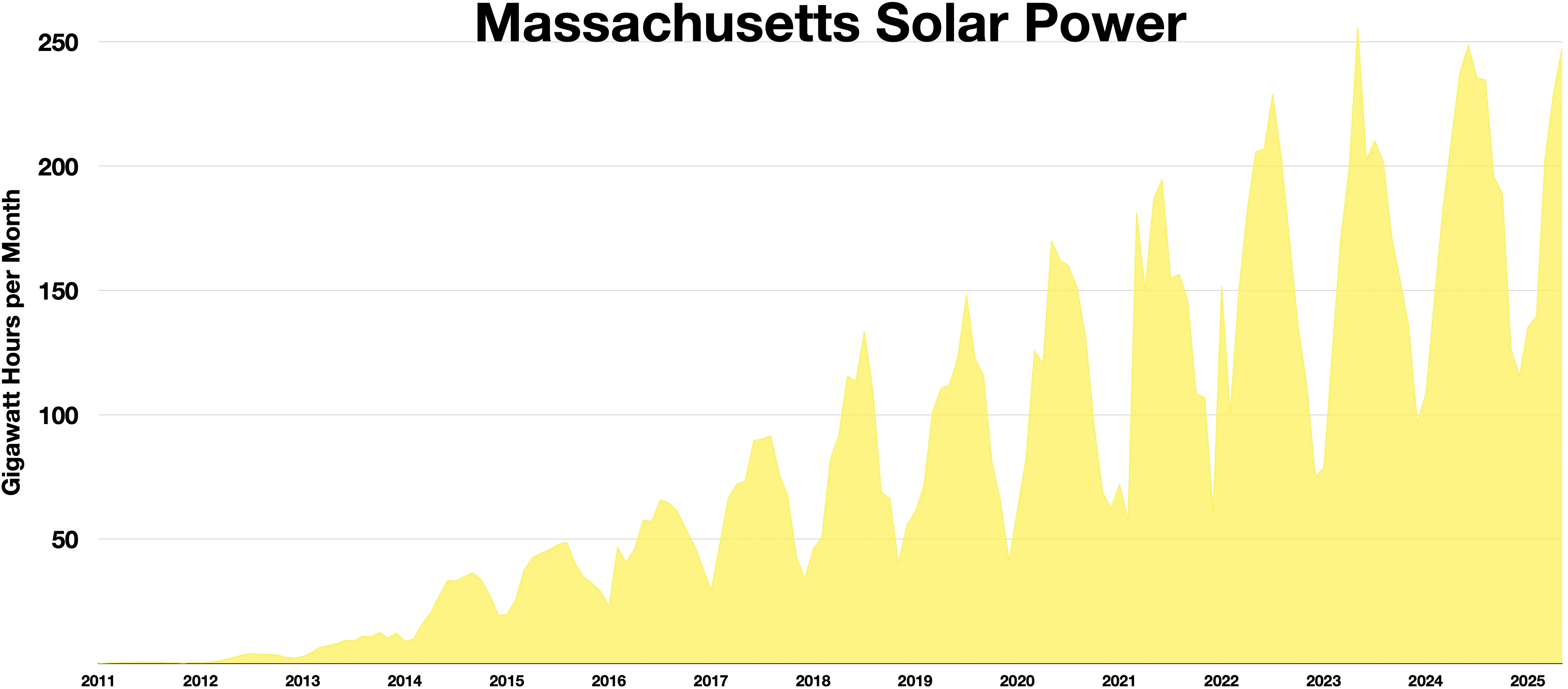
Massachusetts solar power

In 2016, the net metering limits were reached in all utility areas, causing over 240 MW in over 550 projects to be delayed. On April 11, 2016, Massachusetts Governor Charlie Baker signed a bill increasing caps on net metering for private projects from 4% of the utility's load to 7%. Government project caps are 1% higher. The value of net metering credits paid was reduced, with remuneration for large projects set closer to the wholesale electricity price, while smaller projects stay closer to the retail price. Utilities will be able to charge a minimum fee to pay for maintaining the grid.

Massachusetts grid-connected PV capacity (MW)
Year	Capacity	Change	% Change
2003	0.15	0.03	25%
2004	0.21	0.06	40%
2005	0.28	0.07	33%
2006	2.18	1.90	679%
2007	3.83	1.67	76%
2008	7.36	3.53	92%
2009	16.95	9.59	130%
2010	40.07	23.12	136%
2011	74.6	36.4	86%
2012	207.3	123.2	165%
2013	445.0	237.7	115%
2014	734	289	65%
2015	1,020	286	39%
2016	1,360	340	33%
2017	1,699	304	22%
2018	2,465	766	45%
2019	2,767.68	302.68	12%
2020	3,046.7	279.02	10%
2021	3,607.4	560.7	18%
2022	4,158	550.6	%

=== Utility-scale generation ===
Utility-scale solar generation in Massachusetts (GWh)
Year	Total	Jan	Feb	Mar	Apr	May	Jun	Jul	Aug	Sep	Oct	Nov	Dec
2011	4	0	0	0	0	1	1	1	1	0	0	0	0
2012	30	0	0	1	2	3	4	4	4	4	3	3	2
2013	106	3	4	7	7	8	10	9	11	11	13	10	13
2014	307	9	10	16	21	28	34	34	36	37	34	28	20
2015	452	20	26	38	43	45	46	48	49	41	35	32	29
2016	609	23	47	41	47	58	58	66	65	62	55	48	39
2017	790	30	48	67	73	74	91	91	93	77	68	44	34
2018	977	46	51	82	92	116	114	134	110	69	67	40	56
2019	1,166	62	72	102	112	113	124	150	124	117	82	66	42
2020	1,406	63	83	127	122	171	164	161	152	133	97	70	63
2021	1,776	91	89	146	173	190	174	183	176	169	143	135	107

== See also ==
- Wind power in Massachusetts
- Solar power in the United States
- Renewable energy in the United States
- ISO New England
