= Brayton Point Power Station =

Coal-fired power plant in Somerset, Massachusetts, U.S.

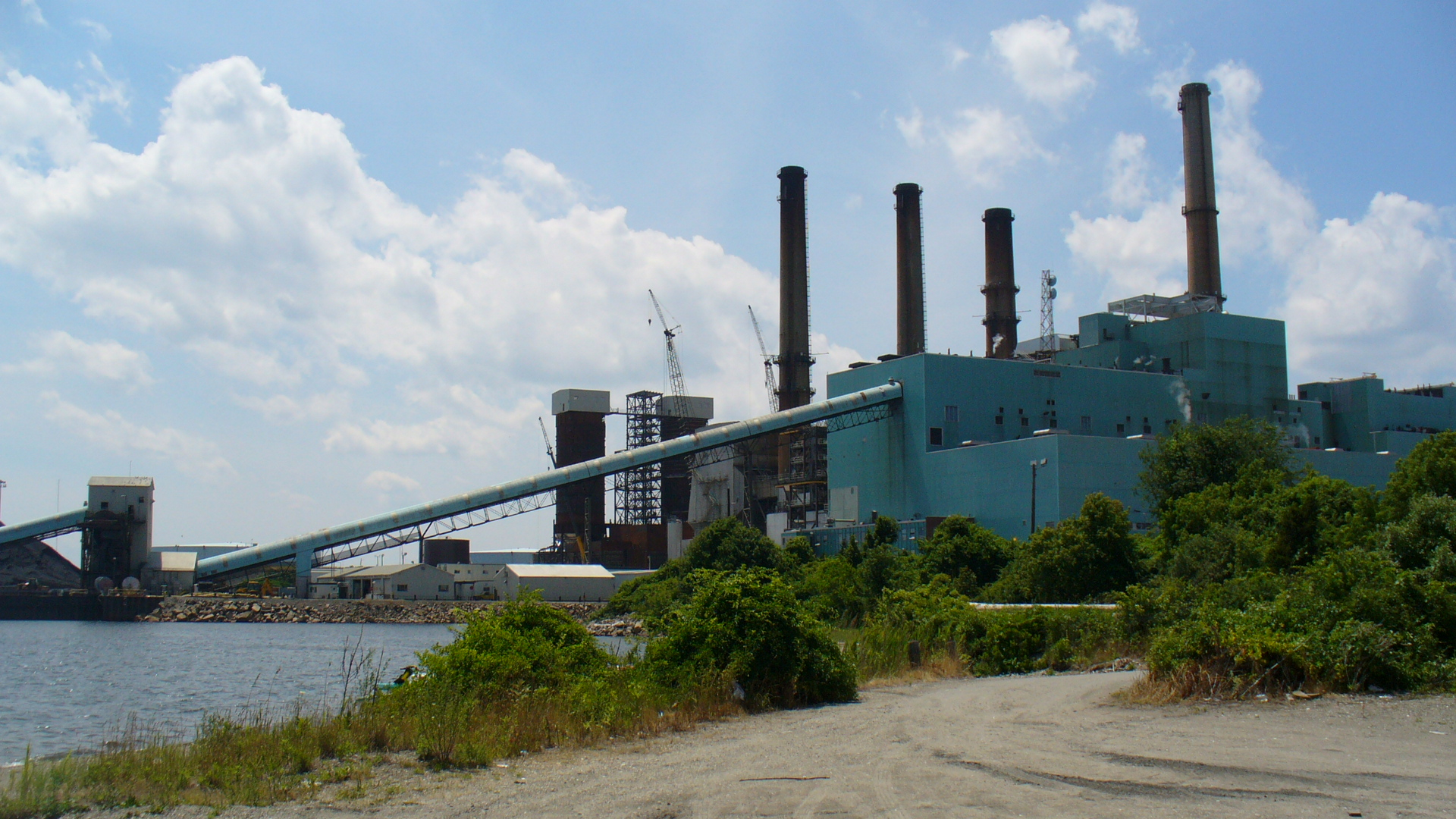
- Brayton Point Power Station
- Country: United States
- Location: Somerset, Massachusetts (near Fall River, Massachusetts)
- Coordinates: 41°42′45″N 71°11′38″W
- Status: Demolished
- Construction began: 1957
- Commission date: 1963
- Decommission date: 2017
- Owner: Dynegy

Thermal power station
- Primary fuel: Coal
- Secondary fuel: Oil (Primary Fuel 1969–1981)
- Cooling source: Taunton River (1963–2011); Cooling Towers (2011-2017)
- Combined cycle?: Yes

Power generation
- Units decommissioned: 4 Unit 1: 243 MW; Unit 2: 240 MW; Unit 3: 612 MW; Unit 4: 435 MW Black start capacity = 3 Diesel Generators (7.6 MW Combined)
- Nameplate capacity: 1,537.6 MW

External links
- Commons: Related media on Commons

Brayton Point Power Station was a coal-fired power plant located in Somerset, Massachusetts. It was the largest coal-fired generating station in New England, and was the last coal-fired power station in Massachusetts to provide power to the regional grid. It had been owned by the power company Dominion Energy New England since 2005, after it was purchased from PG&E. The plant was owned from August 2013 to April 2015 by Energy Capital Partners, and is now owned by Dynegy. The plant ceased power generation and went offline on June 1, 2017.

== Operations ==
The power station began operations in the 1960s and was one of the largest in New England, standing on a 306-acre site. The plant had 262 full-time staff, with four power generating units powering in the region of 1.5 million homes using coal, natural gas and oil as its fuel sources. Its energy outputs from the four units were:

- Unit 1: 243 megawatts
- Unit 2: 240 megawatts
- Unit 3: 612 megawatts
- Unit 4: 435 megawatts

Brayton Power Station had been estimated to burn 40,000 tons of coal in three days, and fresh supplies were brought by barge every four days. The coal was brought from Colombia, Kentucky, and Colorado.

== Environmental improvements ==
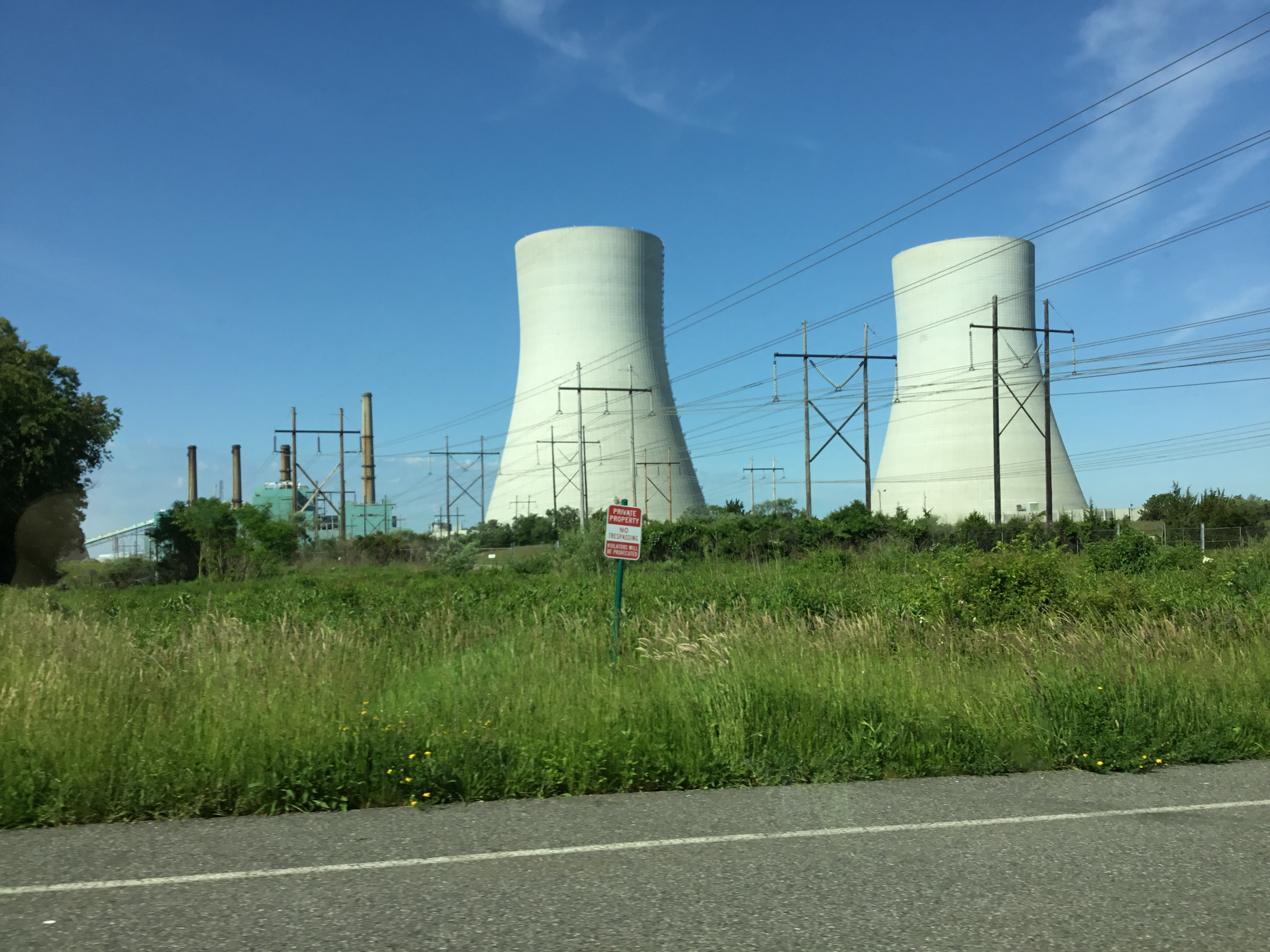
Brayton Point Power Station on the left behind its 497-foot cooling towers.

With regulations and concerns from the public, Dominion agreed to make investments to improve in the environmental impacts of the plant in two areas. Emissions of mercury, sulfur oxide and nitrogen oxide were addressed through the implementation of a system called Novel Integrated Desulphurization (NID). The NID injects lime to allow its reaction with the fumes to separate chemicals from the smoke which reduces the emissions of mercury and sulfur oxide. The company also implemented another system to pass the fumes through ammonia to reduce nitrogen oxide emission. The company reported having a reduction of those emissions by 90 percent after the installation. The other area was to reduce the impact on the water consumption and the release of heated water which was killing fish. Dominion began construction of two 497-foot cooling towers in 2009, which were completed in 2011 at a cost of $600 million. This was to create a closed-cycle water cooling system whereby the heated water is cooled by the towers and the water is recycled back to be used in the system again. This stopped the heated water being released back to Mount Hope Bay.

== Sale and shutdown ==
In March 2013, the Virginia-based owners Dominion announced that Equipower would purchase the power station. The purchase was closed in August 2013 as part of the $650 million deal that Energy Capital Partners took over three power plants, including two other plants in Illinois, the natural gas-fired Elwood Power Station and the coal-fired Kincaid Generating Station. In September 2013, the new owners announced that the plant would be shut down in May 2017, citing low electricity prices as well as high costs to meet environmental standards and maintain aging facilities. It was the last coal-fired power station in Massachusetts.

== Timeline ==
- 1957 - New England Power purchased the land for Brayton Point Power Plant
- August 1, 1963 - Brayton Point Power Plant service begins
- July 1964 - Unit 2 goes online
- 1969 - Third generating unit constructed with the capacity to burn coal or oil
- July 29, 1969 - Third unit went online making the station's total generating capacity 1,100,000 KW
- End of 1969 - All three units, originally designed to burn coal, were converted to burning oil as a result of low oil prices at the time
- May 1973 - The Department of the Army Division Corps of Engineers issues draft environmental statement on addition of a 4th generating unit at Brayton Point. Environmental groups contest the expansion because of water resources Brayton Point is using from Mount Hope Bay and the heat being discharged from the existing three units. A resident says the plant's continued abuse of the air, land, and water, combined with size, presents a daily threat to the quality of life in the area.
- March 30, 1981 - Permanent coal burning began as Unit 1 begins burning coal on a permanent basis
- August 17, 1988 - Brayton Point celebrates 25th anniversary of commercial operation in Unit 1
- June 26, 1995 - Rhode Island Dept of Environmental Management study blames Brayton Point for unique loss of aquatic life in Mount Hope Bay of 87 percent.
- October 23, 1996 - EPA revokes Brayton Point water discharge permit two years before it was set to expire, concerned about decline in Mount Hope Bay fish populations
- September 16, 2000 - Brayton Point must stop use of unlined basins to filter ash which contains metals that can find their way into groundwater
- June 6, 2001 - Mount Hope Bay's temperature has risen two degrees, a warming trend based on discharge from Brayton Point Power Plant in Somerset, according to a study released by a Brown University geologist
- October 3, 2001 - Brayton Point is investing in ambitious new technology to reduce emissions, increase recycling of coal ash and limit any potential damage to Mount Hope Bay... The plant's parent company, PG&E Corp., plans to spend $250 million on these projects
- June 8, 2002 - Brayton Point Emission Plan approved to comply with acting Gov. Jane Swift's tougher regulations on power plants
- July 25, 2002 - On Monday, EPA released its draft water discharge permit for the plant, which stated the station must dramatically reduce the amount of water it withdraws from and discharges back into Mount Hope Bay... The massive cuts will force the power plant to install a closed-cycle cooling system to reduce the amount of hot water discharge.
- October 7, 2003 - EPA approved a new permit that will force the plant to virtually stop releasing massive amounts of heated water into the Taunton River daily, a situation that environmentalists say decimated the fish population.
- September 10, 2004 - USGen New England Inc. agrees to sell Brayton Point and two other power plants to Dominion Resources Inc. of Richmond, Virginia for $656 million
- June 13, 2005 - Inflating of a 107-foot tall dome erected by Dominion Energy New England in Somerset in an effort to reduce fly ash produced at the plant
- July 27, 2005 - Environmental groups' report showed that coal-fired Brayton Point at that time was the top carbon dioxide emitter in the Northeast
- 2006 - Brayton Point installed pulse jet fabric filters (PJFFs) on Units 1 and 2 in series with the existing Koppers and Research-Cottrell electrostatic precipitators (ESPs) to reduce fine particulate, especially PM 2.5 (particulate with particle diameters of up to 2.5 microns). It also installed a "common" spray dryer absorber (SDA) to reduce sulfur dioxide (SO2) emissions. The SDA was common to, and treated the flue gas from, both Units 1 and 2. A limestone preparation plant and a powdered lime and water slurry injection system, spraying downwards at the top of the SDA, was installed to react with the sulfur dioxide to form calcium sulfate. A powder activated carbon (PAC) storage and injection system was also installed on both Units 1 and 2 to reduce mercury emissions. The PAC was injected upstream of the ESPs. The fly ash was pneumatically conveyed to storage silos. Two "booster" centrifugal fans were installed on each Unit to provide additional induced draft to overcome the pressure drop across the PJFFs. The equipment was supplied by Wheelabrator Air Pollution Control, Inc. (changed to Siemens during the construction) and the general construction contractor was Nicholson & Hall Corp. based in Buffalo, NY. Construction was performed in 2006 and 2007.
- October 25, 2007 - Dominion reaches agreement with Cambridge-based startup GreatPoint Energy to build a demonstration facility and research and development center for its new natural gas conversion process
- January 23, 2008 - Dominion reps show renderings and details of proposed 500-foot cooling towers to Somerset residents that they were required to build as a result of agreement with federal EPA
- February 23, 2008 - On Tuesday, EPA New England Regional Office released list of top five polluters in MA for 2006 and Brayton Point topped the list
- September 1, 2009 - Construction is under way on Dominion Energy's two massive 500-foot cooling towers aimed at eliminating the environmental impact of heated water being pushed back into Mount Hope Bay
- October 2011 - The first 497-foot-high cooling tower at Brayton Point will begin use for the first time, a major step in the $620 million project
- March 12, 2013 - Dominion announced Monday that the coal-powered Brayton Point Station has been sold to Energy Capital Partners
- July 29, 2013 - About 44 protesters were arrested for trespassing onto the Brayton Point Power Station site as they marched, while holding handmade signs, and chanted with more than 300 others late Sunday morning in the shadow of the plant's two cooling towers. Protesters cheered on speakers urging state leaders to shut down the coal-fired plant they described as an environmental menace.
- September 2, 2013 - Energy Capital Partners, an energy infrastructure company headquartered in Short Hills, N.J., bought Brayton Point and two Illinois power plants for $650 million, including tax credits, on September 2
- October 8, 2013 - Unable to reach a new deal to supply power to ISO New England, the region's electric grid utility, the new owners of Brayton Point announced that they plan to close the 1500-megawatt coal-fired plant by June 2017
- January 4, 2014 - Owners of Brayton Point and ISO New England could return to price negotiations after the administrators of the region's wholesale electricity market recently said the 1535 MW resource "is needed to ensure reliability" for at least another year
- January 28, 2014 - The owners of the Brayton Point announced that they will go ahead with plans to close the facility in 2017, despite requests from regulators that they keep the plant open
- August 23, 2014 - Dynegy Inc. announced that Brayton Point is part of a $6.25 billion package of power plants – totaling 12,500 MW of coal, gas and oil generation – it was acquiring in two separate deals. The Texas-based company planned to honor the agreement made by Energy Capital Partners, Brayton Point's current owner, which pledged to retire the 1535-megawatt coal plant on May 31, 2017, and to complete its decommissioning
- February 19, 2017 - Several workers leaving their shifts Friday afternoon confirmed they believed this was the final coal shipment
- May 31, 2017 - Brayton Point Power Station closed
- September 25, 2018 - Commercial Development Co. received permits to demolish the pollution emission stacks and the cooling towers
- March 24, 2019 - Three generating units with their 350 foot tall reinforced concrete chimneys torn down
- April 27, 2019 - The two 497-foot tall cooling towers used to reduce thermal pollution from superheated water inside the plant demolished
- November 10, 2019 - A large chunk of the former power plant building was imploded
- February 22, 2020 - The final chimney fell
- July 20, 2022 - President Joe Biden visits Brayton Point and gives a speech announcing new environmental plans.

== Future ==
Due to its existing connections to high voltage transmission lines, the site was considered for potential reuse as a solar farm or onshore connection point for an offshore wind farm.

In February 2022, it was announced that Prysmian Group would purchase land at the site to build an offshore wind undersea cable factory. The first cables are expected to be used for the Commonwealth Wind project being built by Avangrid. In January 2025 Prysmian announced that they were no longer going forward with the project. There is an impression among stakeholders that the decision may have been impacted by incoming President Donald Trump's announcement of deemphasizing wind power.

The Mayflower Wind project proposes to use Brayton Point as one of two onshore connection points for its marine wind turbines.

== See also ==
- List of power stations in Massachusetts
