= SouthCoast Wind =

Proposed offshore wind farm in Massachusetts, United States

- Country: United States
- Location: WEA OCS-A 0521Lease; Outer Continental Shelf; Offshore Massachusetts
- Coordinates: 40.797153°N 70.616667°W
- Status: Proposed
- Owner: Ocean Winds North America

Wind farm
- Type: Offshore
- Distance from shore: 20 miles (32 km)

Power generation
- Make and model: Haliade-X 12 MW
- Nameplate capacity: 2,400 MW

External links
- Website: https://southcoastwind.com/

SouthCoast Wind, formerly known as Mayflower Wind, is a proposed offshore wind farm in U.S. federal waters about 30 miles south of Martha’s Vineyard and 23 miles south of Nantucket, Massachusetts in Lease OCS-A 0521, which covers 127,388 acres. Construction was expected to start in 2025, with power delivery from the project in 2030.

The project is backed by Ocean Winds North America (a global offshore wind collaboration of Engie and EDP Renewables).

It will connect to the grid at the former Brayton Point Power Station.

The project was awarded contracts with Massachusetts for 1,087 MW and with Rhode Island for 200 MW in September 2024.

== Project ==
Wind farm	Offshore BOEM wind energy lease area			States	Coordinates	Capacity (MW)	Completion year	Turbines	Developer/utility	Regulatory agency	Refs
SouthCoast Wind	Offshore Massachusetts; OCS-A 0521	25 nautical miles south of Martha's Vineyard (MA)	127,388 acres (51,552 ha)	MA		1,287	2030	TBA	Shell New Energies; Ocean Winds	MDPU	

== See also ==
- List of offshore wind farms
- List of offshore wind farms in the United States
- Vineyard Wind
- Cape Wind
- East Coast of the United States
- Territorial waters
