= Vineyard Wind =

Offshore wind farm off Massachusetts, U.S.

Vineyard Wind 1
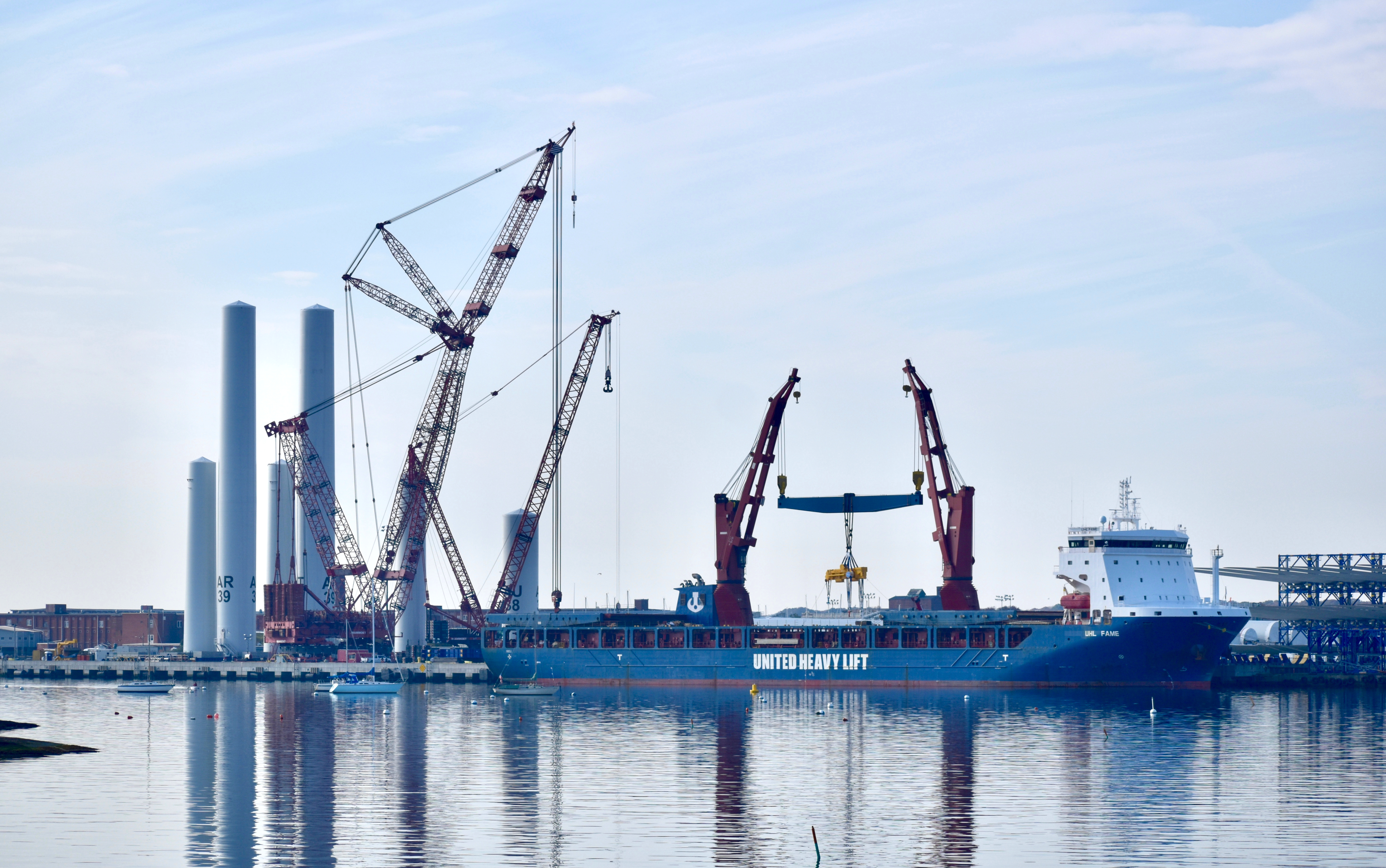
- Turbine components being staged at the New Bedford Marine Commerce Terminal
- Country: United States
- Location: OCS-A 0501 Lease Area; Outer Continental Shelf; Offshore Massachusetts
- Coordinates: 41°02′00″N 70°37′00″W
- Status: Operational
- Construction began: November 18, 2021
- Commission date: October 29, 2026
- Construction cost: $2.3–2.8 billion
- Owners: Avangrid; Copenhagen Infrastructure Partners

Wind farm
- Type: Offshore
- Distance from shore: 15 miles (24 km)
- Rotor diameter: 220 m (720 ft)
- Power purchase agreement: $0.09 / kWh for 20 years

Power generation
- Make and model: GE Haliade-X 13 MW
- Units planned: 62 × 13 MW
- Nameplate capacity: 804 MW

External links
- Website: www.vineyardwind.com

Vineyard Wind 1 is an offshore wind energy project located about 24 km (15 mi) south off the coast of Martha's Vineyard, Massachusetts, United States. Vineyard Wind 1 features 62 fixed-bottom wind turbines, with a combined nameplate capacity of 804MW. At peak production, this provides energy equivalent of powering 400,000 homes. The turbines used are manufactured by GE Offshore Wind, each capable of generating up to 13MW. The $4 billion project was developed by Copenhagen Infrastructure Partners in partnership with Iberdrola and aimed to contribute substantially to Massachusetts' renewable energy targets while reducing carbon emissions. The Massachusetts Department of Public Utilities approved the project in 2019, and construction began in November 2021. Power from the first turbine started flowing into the ISO New England grid in January 2024. The onshore cable landing sites is an onshore substation in Hyannis village, positioned next to the existing Eversource substation.

Construction of the wind farm was completed when the final wind turbine blades were installed on March 13, 2026. Construction was paused in late December 2025 due to a Trump administration order to pause all offshore wind leases to review "national security risks". A preliminary court injunction in January 2026 allowed construction to resume while the lawsuit proceeded. The wind farm became fully operational on October 29, 2026.

== Project overview ==
The project is jointly owned by Copenhagen Infrastructure Partners and Iberdrola, through a subsidiary of Avangrid Renewables. GE Offshore Wind (a subsidiary of GE Wind Energy based in Europe) is supplying the 62 turbines. Windar Renovables is building the foundations. Nexans Group & Prysmian Group is providing cabling.

Two independent submarine power cables run from an offshore 220 kV transformer about 15 miles south of the southeast corner of Martha's Vineyard, to Covell's Beach in Centerville in Barnstable on Cape Cod about 34 miles (some 55 km) away. They feed into the 115 kV grid at Barnstable Switching Station owned by Eversource.

The Port of New Bedford has been used as a staging area for the project. DEME is handling some construction and installation logistics. The vessels used must comply with the Jones Act, so feeder barges transport components from port to site. Salem Harbor has also been developed as an offshore wind port in conjunction with the project.

During construction a bubble curtain from Thayer Mahan, Inc. is being deployed.

A final environmental impact statement (FEIS) was released in March 2021. Approval was delayed during the term of U.S. president Donald Trump, due to concerns regarding fishing and safety. The permission was fast-tracked after Joe Biden took office. Final major federal approval was granted on May 11, 2021.

A total of $2.3 billion in project funding was secured in October 2021. The Responsible Offshore Development Alliance representing fishing interests filed a federal lawsuit several months later disputing the approval, and a group of Nantucket residents did so in January 2023. Solar competitor Allco Renewable Energy also filed suit. Construction proceeded despite the lawsuits.

Electricity from the first turbines began flowing on January 2, 2024, with the final turbines expected to be installed by the end 2024.

The developers have agreed to suspend construction during right whale activity in the area, and University of New Hampshire monitors their sounds. The project is expected to both reduce greenhouse gas emissions and reduce electricity costs for Massachusetts consumers. The wind farm has secured 20-year contracts to sell the power it produces for a fixed 20-year price of $0.09/kWh and has agreed to provide a total of $15 million for a fund to provide battery storage in low-income communities.

Six beaches on the island of Nantucket were closed after a wind-turbine blade from the offshore wind farm broke apart on July 13, 2024, sending fiberglass shards into the Atlantic Ocean and onto the nearby coast. GE Vernova said the cause of the blade failure was a manufacturing defect involving "insufficient bonding" and a failure of the factory's quality control to catch the issue. GE Vernova inspected more than 100 other blades, and removed blades from at least two turbines due to finding defects. The federal government ordered the project to stop producing power as a result of the incident, with wind turbine operation only restarting in January 2025. In July 2025, GE Vernova announced a $10.5 million dollar settlement with the town of Nantucket for costs associated with the incident.

In order to reduce nighttime visual impact, the red warning lights on the top of the towers are only turned on when radar detects an approaching aircraft. In September 2025, Nantucket residents complained this system was malfunctioning.

== Development timeline ==
This timeline traces the development from the project from 2015 to 2025 when the operation of Vineyard Wind 1 is expected begin. It is organized in four distinct phases that the project must go through in order to be complete. The first phase is early development and planning, during which time the Bureau of Ocean Energy Management (BOEM) gauges interest in a new lease area, evaluates the environmental impacts that may be imposed on it by construction, and conducts an auction to select a developer for a new offshore wind project. During the second phase, environmental review and permitting, the developer must submit a plan for how they will build, operate, and decommission the project. In response to this, BOEM must conduct an environmental analysis to assess the impacts of the plan, and consider comments submitted from the public regarding the public. In the third phase, record of decision and approvals, BOEM along with other implicated agencies must consider the environmental analysis and make a final decision on whether or not to approve the project. If approved, the project moves to the final phase during which is the action construction and installation of the wind farm.

| Early Development & Planning | January 2015: Bureau of Ocean Energy Management (BOEM) awarded Lease OCS-A 0501, encompassing approximately 166,886 acres, to Vineyard Wind.; April 1, 2015: The effective date of Lease OCS-A 0501.; May 10, 2018: BOEM approves Vineyard Wind's Site Assessment Plan (SAP). |
| Environmental Review & Permitting | December 2017: Construction & Operation Plan submitted to BOEM for approximately 800 megawatts (MW).; March 30, 2018: BOEM publishes a Notice of Intent (NOI) to prepare an Environmental Impact Statement (EIS) for Vineyard Wind initiating a 30-day public comment period.; April 30, 2018: Public comment period for EIS ends.; December 7, 2018: BOEM publishes a Notice of Availability (NOA) for the draft of EIS.; December 5, 2024: COP Revision submitted to BOEM detailing the removal of the blades from up to 22 wind turbine generators. |
| Record of Decision & Approvals | March 12, 2021: The project received the Final Environmental Impact Statement (FEIS) from BOEM, which signaled approval for the project.; May 10, 2021: U.S. Department of the Interior releases Record of Decision (ROD) favoring 84 or fewer turbines. |
| Construction & Installation | 2021: Onshore construction for underground export circuits begins.; 2022: Offshore construction begins with export cable installation.; 2023: Wind turbine installation commences.; January 2, 2024: First power is achieved as one turbine delivers approximately 5 MW of power to the grid.; July 13, 2024: Installed blade at wind turbine generator AW-38 fails, releasing blade debris. BOEM halts construction and power generation.; January 18, 2025: Further construction reauthorized; complete wind turbines allowed to generate power again.; July 25, 2025: 17 turbines are operational.; October 5, 2025 30 turbines are operational, with another 25 installed.; End of 2025: Construction was expected to be complete. Construction was 95% complete when it was paused in December 2025 due to a lawsuit, but the pause was at least temporarily lifted in January 2026.; March 3, 2026 60 turbines have been installed, and 52-55 are operational.; March 13, 2026 Construction is completed, with the last turbine installed.; October 29, 2026 Wind farm fully operational. |

== Lease area ==
=== Location ===
Vineyard Wind 1 is located in federally controlled water on the Commercial Lease Outer Continental Shelf (OCS)-A-0501, which is approximately 12 nautical miles off the coast of Martha's Vineyard and 12 nautical miles from Nantucket. The lease area comprises 166,886 acres, and only the Northern section will be occupied by Vineyard Wind 1 project.

=== History of lease area ===
In 2009, the Bureau of Ocean Energy Management (BOEM) initiated the renewable energy program (authorized under the Energy Policy Act of 2005), which provides a structure for regional planning and analysis, lease issuance, site assessment, and construction and operations. BOEM is required by the Outer Continental Shelf Lands Act (OCSLA) to award offshore wind lease areas competitively, through a "Call for Information and Nominations" process. BOEM published its Call for Information and Nominations on the 6th of February 2012 in the Federal Register to gauge interest for the Call Area. The Call additionally asked for information from the public regarding issues relevant to the review of nominations for the potential lease area.

On the 12th of November 2012, BOEM published a Final Environmental Assessment and Finding of No Significant Impact for commercial wind lease issuance and site assessment activities on the Atlantic Outer Continental Shelf (OCS) in the Call Area. On June 17, 2014, BOEM and Massachusetts announced that a total of 3,002 square kilometers (742,000 acres) would be designated for commercial wind energy leasing. Later, on January 29, 2015, BOEM conducted a competitive auction to lease sections the area. Vineyard Wind 1 won the lease area, with a bid of $135.1 million, outcompeting 10 other developers, the most company participants in an OSW auction in the US thus far.

== Regulatory and permitting process ==
In March 2017, the Site Assessment plan, detailing the methods Vineyard Wind 1 project might use to collect data on the marine environment in the lease area to better understand it, was submitted to BOEM and approved in November 2017. The Construction and Operations plan (COP) was submitted in December 2017 to BOEM, laying out detailed plans for construction and operations offshore and extensive archaeological surveys evaluation. Onshore transmission plans were submitted to the state of Massachusetts at the same time. In May 2019, the state board approved Vineyard Wind 1 transmission plan.

During the public comments period in June 2020, 29,000 positive comments were received for Vineyard wind. In March 2021, BOEM released Final Environmental Impact Statement (EIS). After a 3-year review of the Environmental Impact Statement (EIS) by multiple agencies, BOEM approved the COP with revisions.

=== Environmental Impact Statement (EIS) ===
BOEM released a Notice of Intent in March 2018 to prepare an Environmental Impact Statement, to review the potential impacts of the COP and inform a final decision on Vineyard Wind 1. The release of the NOI marked the beginning of a 30-day public comment period, in which BOEM held five public scoping meetings in Massachusetts and Rhode Island. In December 2018, BOEM published a draft EIS and following public commenting and review, the final EIS was published in March 2021, including a full and fair discussion of the significant environmental impacts of the project.

To carry out their analysis, BOEM employs a maximum case scenario methodology, whereby each aspect of the project is analyzed according to what the greatest potential impact could be. Consideration is given to physical, biological and socioeconomic and cultural factors that might be affected. Therefore, Vineyard was required as part of their COP to develop a Project Design Envelope (PDE) which defines project parameters and characteristics while maintaining a degree of flexibility for selection of components and design. With the PDE, each aspect of the project is analyzed according to its highest conceivable impact, and classified as negligible, minor, moderate or major.

The in depth environmental analysis was carried out not only for the proposed project in the COP but also for a range of alternatives. These alternatives were developed by BOEM in consultation with other agencies, such as the NMFS and in response to comments received during the public comment period. Analyzing various alternatives allowed BOEM to identify a preferred plan of action, picking and choosing various action plans in combination. This informs BOEMs final decision in the Record of Decision (ROD). For Vineyard Wind, 20 total alternatives were considered by BOEM during the EIS preparation and only 6 were carried forward. The other 14 were not continued because they did not meet the purpose or need of screening criteria.

The proposed Action plan, “Alternative A” outlines a plan of 100 Wind turbine generators (WTGs), each with 8 to 10 MW generation capacity and spaced between 0.75 and 1 mile apart. Up to two electric service platforms would be used. One of two Onshore export cable routes (OECRs) would be used, either New Hampshire Avenue and Covell's Beach.

The first Alternative “B” would eliminate the New Hampshire Avenue cable landfall option and OECR route, limiting the OECR to the Covell's Beach option only. This was in response to extensive public comments against the NH avenue. Vineyard Wind acquired all the local and state permits required for the Covell's Beach OERC, and therefore, Covell's Beach became the default OERC for the proposed action and thus alternative B was no longer evaluated as an alternative. Alternative C is the No Surface Occupancy in the northernmost Portion of the project area alternative, to reduce the visual impacts of the proposed project and potential conflicts with existing ocean uses such as fishing. Consequently 6 WTGs would be excluded from the northern corner, and they would be relocated to the southern part of the lease area.

Alternative D proposes Wind Turbine Layout modification, whereby the wind turbine array layout would be changed to potentially reduce impacts on existing ocean uses. Two alternative layouts were proposed: D1, whereby WTGs would have at least 1 mile between them and then lanes between turbines would also be a minimum 1 mile. D2 whereby the wind turbine layout would be arranged in an East to West orientation and all WTGs would again have a minimum of 1 mile of spacing between them. Alternative E is the reduced project size alternative, where the proposed project would consist of no more than 84 WTGs in order to potentially reduce impacts on the environment. Alternative F is where a vessel transit line through the WDA would be established, in which no surface occupancy can occur. This lane would allow for the transit of vessels through the project area from southern New England ports, such as New Bedford. This would disclose the effect a transit lane could have on the expected effects from the other action alternatives. The final alternative ‘G’ was named “No Action” which means that BOEM would not approve Vineyard Wind 1. Analyzing this as an alternative provides a baseline comparison of environmental impact of the offshore wind project.

== Finance ==
Vineyard Wind 1 was financed through a combination of equity and debt financing, tax equity investments, and government incentives. The project is a joint venture between Copenhagen Infrastructure Partners and Avangrid Renewables, a subsidiary of Iberdrola. The project secured approximately $2.3 billion in senior debt financing in 2021 from a group of nine leading international and U.S. banks, including Santander, BNP Paribas, BBVA, Bank of America, MUFG, Credit Agricole, JP Morgan, Natixis, and NatWest. Since, additional banks have joined the syndication process to bring the total funder count to 25 institutions. This initial funding was advised by Santander and led by Vineyard Wind's General Counsel, Jennifer Simon Lento along with the legal firm, Norton Rose Fulbright, serving as lead financing counsel. This financial milestone allowed Vineyard Wind to issue their notice to proceed to contractors in order to begin construction.

A large portion of the financing for Vineyard Wind 1 was secured through tax equity investments, a common way for renewable energy projects to be funded. Tax equity financing allows investors to fund projects in exchange for tax benefits, reducing their federal tax obligations. In October 2023, the project closed a $1.2 billion tax equity package, the largest single-asset tax equity deal in American history. This financing was led by J.P. Morgan Chase, Bank of America, and Wells Fargo. It was structured as a partnership flip, which means that tax equity investors receive most of the tax benefits and profits in the early stages of the project, but eventually ownership shifts back to the original project sponsors. This investment was made possible through the Investment Tax Credit, which allows developers to reduce their tax burden by a certain percentage of the project's overall cost. According to the Inflation Reduction Act (IRA), Vineyard Wind qualified for a 30% Investment Tax Credit. The developers initially sought a 40% ITC rate, but due to IRS and Treasury Department regulations, were unable to secure it.

The overall financing of Vineyard Wind 1 benefited significantly from federal tax credits and supportive government policies aimed at expanding offshore wind capacity in the U.S. For example, the Inflation Reduction Act from the Biden administration helped to increase the availability of tax equity financing. Additionally, Massachusetts state policies and power purchase agreements (PPAs) with National Grid, Eversource, and Unitil guarantee that these three utilities will buy electricity from Vineyard Wind at an agreed upon price.

== Infrastructure ==
=== Offshore Wind Farm ===
The Vineyard Wind 1 farm consists of 62 wind turbine generators installed in a grid pattern spaced 1 nautical mile apart. The developers selected General Electric as their turbine provider, choosing their Haliade-X turbines capable of producing 13 MW of electricity each. Each turbine consists of a three-bladed rotor, with a total rotor diameter between 164 and 222 meters. The total height of each turbine from the seabed to the tip of the blade ranges from 191 to 255 meters. The turbines are anchored using monopile foundations driven into the seabed.

The wind farm also features one offshore substation (OSS), placed within the wind turbine generator grid and will serve to consolidate and step up the voltage of the electricity before its transmission to the onshore grid. This OSS is mounted on a monopile foundation designed to withstand extreme marine conditions. The electricity is transmitted from the turbines to the OSS via a network of 66-kilovolt (kV) inter-array cables buried beneath the seabed.

=== Grid Interconnection ===
From the OSS, two 220-kV export cables transport the electricity to the onshore grid. These cables are buried under the seabed using jetplows, specialized underwater tools that use high-pressure water to fluidize the seabed. The cables can then be laid up to six feet below the seafloor before the sediment naturally resettles, minimizing environmental impact. The offshore cables make landfall at Covell's Beach in Barnstable, Massachusetts, where they transition to onshore transmission lines through a technique called horizontal directional drilling (HDD). HDD is a trenchless construction technique utilized to minimize surface disturbance in the installation of underground cables or pipelines. A pilot hole is drilled along a predetermined path and then enlarged to allow room for the cables, which are pulled through the hole. This method ensures minimal environmental disruption, especially in environmentally sensitive areas, such as beaches and wetlands.

From the landfall point at Covell's Beach, the onshore export cables travel underground along public roads for approximately 5.3 miles before reaching the Vineyard Wind 1 onshore substation, in Barnstable's Independence Park. This underground cable system is placed in a concrete-encased duct bank to ensure protection and reliability. The onshore substation is crucial to the integration of the electricity generated by the turbines into the regional electricity grid. Four 220/115-kV transformers are stored in the substation, along with switchgear and other electrical equipment. The Barnstable Switching Station allows the electricity generated by Vineyard Wind 1 to be supplied to the Massachusetts energy grid.

=== Ports and Vessels ===
The New Bedford Marine Commerce Terminal is a 26-acre port facility that supports the construction of the Vineyard Wind 1 project. The facility serves as a hub for assembling, staging, and transporting turbine components. In addition to New Bedford, multiple other port facilities along the Northeast U.S. coastline are used for different aspects of the project.

Specialized installation vessels transport turbine components from staging areas to the offshore construction sites where they can be assembled and installed. Among these specialized vessels are jack-up installation ships, that can lift turbine components into place, and cable-laying vessels, which can install the underwater transmission cables that connect the wind farm to the onshore grid. In addition, crew transfer vessels (CTVs) and service operation vessels (SOVs) support offshore construction and long-term maintenance. These vessels ensure safe access to the turbines and substations for technicians to work on construction and maintenance.

== 2025–2026 ==
As of July 2025, Vineyard Wind was expected to be finished at the end of 2025. With their first project nearing completion, the developers, Copenhagen Infrastructure Partners (CIP) and Avangrid, are looking to future offshore wind projects in the region. They secured leasing for Vineyard Wind 2 in September 2024 in what was expected to be a joint agreement between Connecticut, Rhode Island, and Massachusetts. However, in December 2024, Connecticut decided to not go through with the tri-state procurement and the project was shelved.

The Vineyard Wind 1 project has had strong support from federal, state, and local governments, environmental organizations, and labor groups. However, worries for the broader offshore wind industry have arisen with the inauguration of the Trump administration in January 2025. President Trump has made his intentions to prevent future development of the offshore wind industry very clear. While Vineyard Wind 1, has secured all necessary permits and agreements, and has already connected to the onshore grid, future offshore wind projects will likely encounter increased uncertainty depending on federal energy policies.

On 22 December 2025, the US interior department suspended Vineyard Wind 1 and four other offshore wind leases (Sunrise Wind and Empire Wind in New York, Coastal Virginia Offshore Wind and Revolution Wind (Rhode Island)) over what it said were 'national security concerns'.

Ørsted filed a lawsuit. On January 12, 2026, US district judge Royce Lamberth has overturned the construction freeze of Revolution Wind. He said this project is likely to succeed in the ongoing legal dispute.

On January 27, a federal judge in the U.S. District Court for the District of Massachusetts issued a preliminary injunction that Vineyard Wind could resume construction during the lawsuit.

Construction of the wind farm was completed when the final wind turbine blades were installed on March 13, 2026.

Vineyard Wind sued GE Vernova in April 2026, after GE Renewables said it would terminate its services and maintenance contract by the end of April. The lawsuit aims to stop GE Vernova from terminating the contract. GE Vernova claims that Vineyard Wind owes it $300 million for work performed, while Vineyard Wind claims that GE Vernova owes $545 million to make up for costs and delays associated with the July 2024 blade collapse. A federal judge issued a preliminary injunction against GE Vernova in April, ordering that GE cannot exit its contract, and denied GE Vernova's motion to reconsider the injunction in June. As of May 2026, Vineyard Wind said 36 of the 62 turbines were not spinning and that GE Vernova needed to perform additional work on the wind turbines.

== See also ==
- Renewable energy commercialisation
- Sea breeze
- Sustainable energy
- Wave farm
- East Coast of the United States
- Wind power in Massachusetts
- List of offshore wind farms
- List of offshore wind farms in the United States
