= Plug-in electric vehicles in Massachusetts =

As of November 2021, there were about 30,000 electric vehicles in Massachusetts.

In July 2021, Massachusetts was ranked by AutoInsuranceEZ as the second-best state in the United States to own an electric car, behind California.

== Government policy ==
In December 2020, the state government announced a requirement that all new cars sold in the state be electric by 2035.

As of November 2021, the state offers a $2,500 tax rebate for electric vehicle purchases.

== Charging stations ==
As of 2022, there were around 1,600 charging stations in Massachusetts.

In February 2022, the state government announced a US$13 million program to build charging stations.

== Public opinion ==
A poll conducted in 2021 by Coltura and the Green Energy Consumers Alliance showed that 56% of Massachusetts voters were likely to buy an electric vehicle in the next five years.

== By region ==
=== Boston ===
As of 2019, there were about 2,000 electric vehicles registered in Boston. As of 2023, 8% of new cars registered in Greater Boston were electric.

As of December 2021, there were 10 municipally owned charging stations in Boston. In December 2021, Boston mayor Michelle Wu announced plans to add about 70 additional charging stations.

=== Cape Cod ===
As of February 2024, there were four public charging stations in Orleans, three in Harwich, and none in Chatham or Brewster.

=== Springfield ===
Springfield installed the first public charging stations in Western Massachusetts in 2018 at Union Station.

=== Worcester ===
As of 2021, about 4% of vehicles in Worcester were electric.
