= ISO New England =

Oversees the operation of New England's bulk electric power system

- Founded: 1997; 2005 (designated RTO)
- Type: Non profit, independent system operator
- Headquarters: 1 Sullivan Rd; Holyoke, MA; 01040
- President and CEO: Vamsi Chadalavada
- Website: www.iso-ne.com

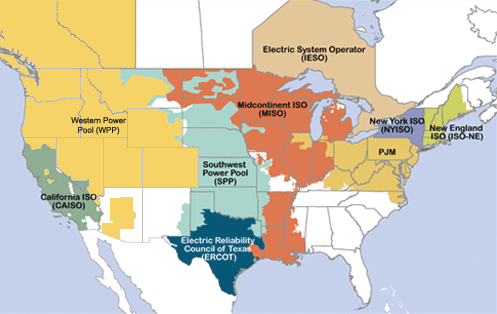
ISOs and RTOs of North America as of 2024

ISO New England Inc. (ISO-NE) is an independent, non-profit regional transmission organization (RTO), headquartered in Holyoke, Massachusetts, serving Connecticut, Maine, Massachusetts, New Hampshire, Rhode Island, and Vermont.

ISO-NE oversees the operation of New England's bulk electric power system and transmission lines, generated and transmitted by its member utilities, as well as Hydro-Québec, NB Power, the New York Power Authority and utilities in New York state, when the need arises. ISO-NE is responsible for reliably operating New England's 32,000 megawatt bulk electric power generation and transmission system. One of its major duties is to provide tariffs for the prices, terms, and conditions of the energy supply in New England.

ISO New England ensures the day-to-day reliable operation of New England's bulk power generation and transmission system, oversees the administration of the region's wholesale electricity markets, and manages the regional planning processes.

ISO-NE was created in 1997 by the Federal Energy Regulatory Commission, as a replacement for the New England Power Pool (NEPOOL), which was created in 1971.

The ISO-NE grid does not extend to remote parts of eastern and northern Maine in Washington and Aroostook Counties. The power grid in these areas is managed by the Northern Maine Independent System Administrator on behalf of local utilities which are interconnected only via NB Power.

== History ==
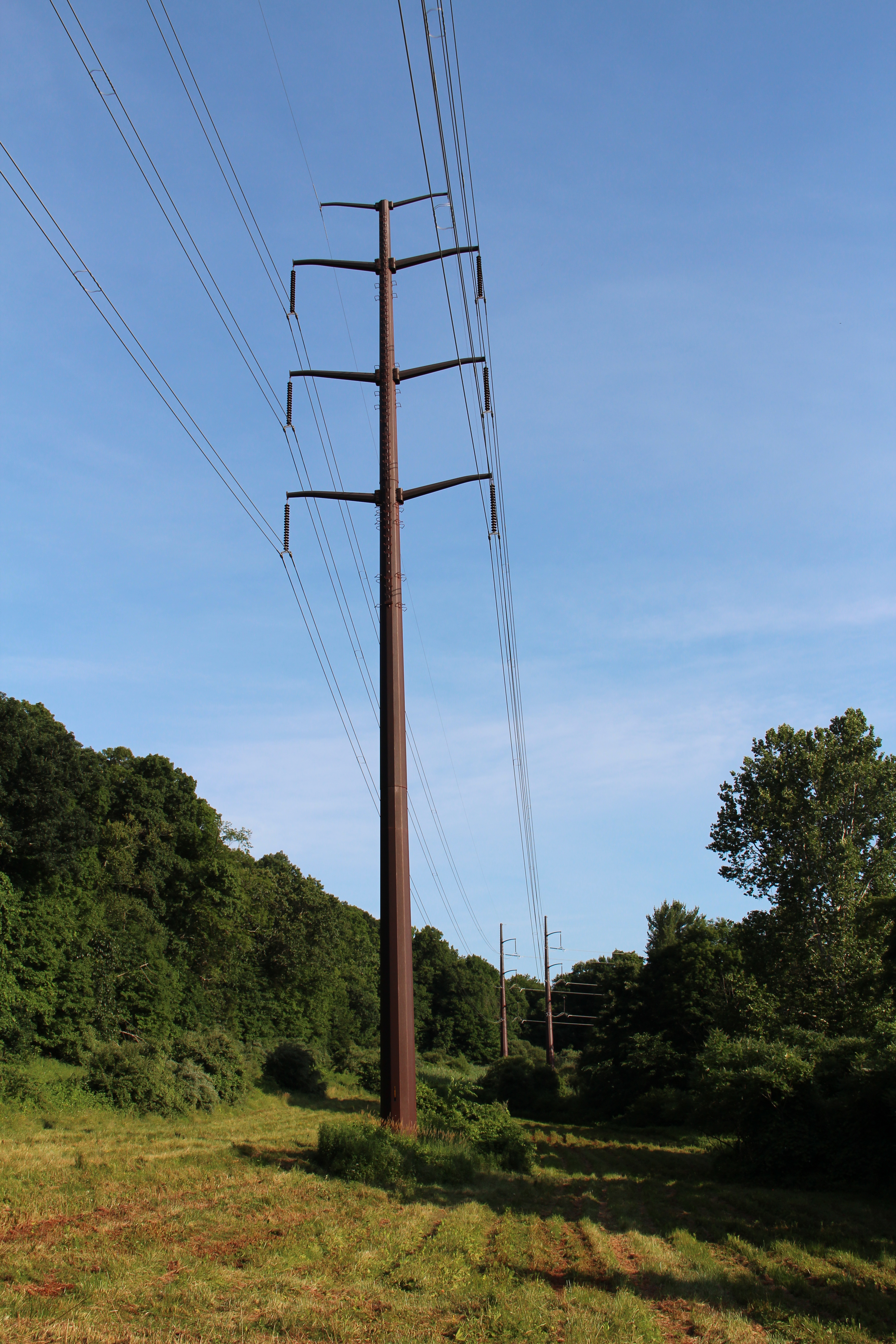
345 kV transmission lines in western Connecticut

New England's electric power industry, like that of the entire nation, changed dramatically during the past few decades. Until the 1970s, the industry consisted of utilities that handled every aspect of providing electricity: generating it, transmitting it and then distributing it to homes and businesses. These utilities were regulated local monopolies that operated independently of each other.

The Northeast Blackout of 1965 marked a turning point for the region's electric power industry. It shut down power for 30 million customers. In January 1966, the Northeast Power Coordinating Council (NPCC) formed to improve system reliability. Concerned about the system's reliability, the Northeast's power companies formed three "power pools" to ensure a dependable supply of electricity. The New England Power Pool (NEPOOL), formed in 1971 by the region's private and municipal utilities, was intended to foster cooperation and coordination among utilities in the six-state region.

During the next three decades, NEPOOL created a regional power grid that now includes more than 300 separate generating plants and more than 8,000 miles of transmission lines.

While the electric power industry's regulated monopolies worked well for generations, by the 1990s the lack of competition provided little reason to improve service, minimize prices or invest in new facilities and technologies. In New England, electricity rates were among the nation's highest, and the region had an antiquated electric power infrastructure.

In the early 1990s, Congress and the Federal Energy Regulatory Commission (FERC)—which oversees the electricity industry nationally—began enabling the restructuring of wholesale electric power. They believed competition would provide needed renewal, much as it had in transportation, telecommunications and financial services.

The FERC created a level playing field for competitive markets, ensuring equal access to transmission grids and encouraging states to require utilities to sell off power plants and gradually eliminate regulator-set rates in favor of prices determined by the markets.

In 1996, FERC Order 888 deregulated portions of the electric power market. In 1997, the ISO created a management system for the regional bulk power system and proposed new wholesale markets and ensure access to transmission systems. In 1999, the ISO began managing restructured regional wholesale power markets.

In 2005, ISO New England begins operation as a Regional Transmission Organization.

In 2008, the RTO held the first auction under the new Forward Capacity Market, designed to ensure the region continuously develops the resources needed to meet demand and maintain reliability. In 2010, it launched the final phase of the Forward Capacity Market.

== Creating independent system operators ==
The FERC created independent system operators, or ISOs, to oversee restructuring on a regional basis. These ISOs were given responsibility for ensuring reliability and establishing and overseeing competitive wholesale electricity markets.

ISO New England was approved by FERC in 1997. Utilities in five of the six states have sold off their power plants through state sponsored retail choice programs designed to add competition at the retail level. Vermont investigated but did not opt for retail choice, and did not require its distribution utilities to sell off their generation resources.

Its board of directors and over 500 employees have no financial interest in any company doing business in the region's wholesale electricity marketplace.

=== The move to markets ===
Working closely with the New England Power Pool, now a group of generators, utilities, marketers, public power companies and end users, ISO New England implemented wholesale markets in 1999. About 400 market participants complete $10 billion in wholesale electricity transactions annually.

ISO New England enhanced these markets in 2003, when it adopted a “Standard Market Design (SMD).” SMD added features such as a Day-Ahead Market to protect against price volatility and locational pricing that improves efficiency by accurately gauging the true cost of producing and supplying power anywhere in the region.

=== Strengthened oversight and governance through RTOs ===
In 2005, FERC designated ISO New England as the regional transmission organization for the six-state region. In this role, ISO New England continues to fulfill its responsibilities, but with broader authority over the day-to-day operation of the transmission system and greater independence to manage the power grid and wholesale markets.

There are 6.5 million customer households and businesses.

In 2021, the market rules of ISO New England were criticized as inflating the bid prices of renewable energy compared to other sources, resulting in higher consumer costs and more pollution.

In February 2022, ISO-New England reversed a previous decision that would have encouraged the development of clean energy -- solar and wind -- for New England's electrical grid. The decision, rejecting a request by the Federal Energy Regulatory Commission, is expected to delay clean energy development in the region by two years or more. "It's another example of not meeting the moment to usher in the clean energy transition," according to Jeremy McDiarmid of the Northeast Clean Energy Council.

== See also ==
- Energy law
- Smart Grid
- Independent system operator
- List of United States electric companies
- Northeast Blackout
- Northeast Power Coordinating Council (NPCC)
- Wind power in Massachusetts
- Solar power in the United States
- Renewable energy in the United States
