= Massachusetts Department of Public Utilities =

Massachusetts state agency

The Massachusetts Department of Public Utilities is one of two Public Utilities Commissions of the Commonwealth of Massachusetts, in the Executive Office of Energy and Environmental Affairs. There are currently three members of the commission. Its major duties include the regulation of public utility companies that distribute electric power, natural gas, and water to the citizens of Massachusetts. Current commissioners as of 2026 are Jeremy McDiarmid, chair, Staci Rubin, and Liz Anderson.

DPU also has a number transportation oversight responsibilities not handled by the Massachusetts Department of Transportation. Specifically, its Transportation Network Company Division exercises oversight of rideshare companies, service, and drivers. Its Transportation Oversight Division regulates the rates and practices of common carriers used to transport passengers, buses, household moving companies, and towing companies and also licenses all intrastate Massachusetts-based motor bus companies. Lastly, the DPU's Rail Transit Safety Division is responsible for overseeing the safety of equipment and operations of the Massachusetts Bay Transit Authority and has exclusive regulatory authority over all public rail crossings in Massachusetts.

Prior to 2007, the DPU also was responsible for the regulation of telecommunications and cable services under a predecessor agency, the Department of Telecommunications and Energy. In 2007, the Massachusetts Department of Telecommunications and Cable was established as a separate regulatory body, whose duties include the regulation of public utility companies that distribute satellite & cable television (licenses), broadband, and telecommunications services.
