= List of power stations in Massachusetts =

Sources of Massachusetts utility-scale electricity generation in gigawatt-hours, full-year 2025:
1. Natural gas: 17,807 (75.8%)
2. Solar: 2,529 (10.8%)
3. Biomass: 875 (3.73%)
4. Hydroelectric: 827 (3.52%)
5. Petroleum: 402 (1.71%)
6. Wind: 210 (0.89%)
7. Other: 838 (3.57%)

This is a list of electricity-generating power stations in the U.S. state of Massachusetts, sortable by type and name. In 2023, Massachusetts had a total summer capacity of 12,850 MW through all of its power plants, and a net generation of 19,695 GWh. In 2024, the electrical energy generation mix was 74.7% natural gas, 10.9% solar, 4.4% biomass, 3.8% hydroelectric, 0.9% petroleum, 0.9% wind, and 4.5% other. The state's last remaining nuclear power plant was retired in May 2019.

Massachusetts consumes about twice as much electricity as it generates, but is among the lowest electricity consumption states on a per capita basis, as well as on a per dollar of GDP basis. Distributed small-scale solar, including customer-owned photovoltaic panels, delivered an additional net 4,064 GWh to the state's electricity grid in 2024. This compares as about 80 percent more than the amount generated by Massachusetts' utility-scale solar facilities that year.

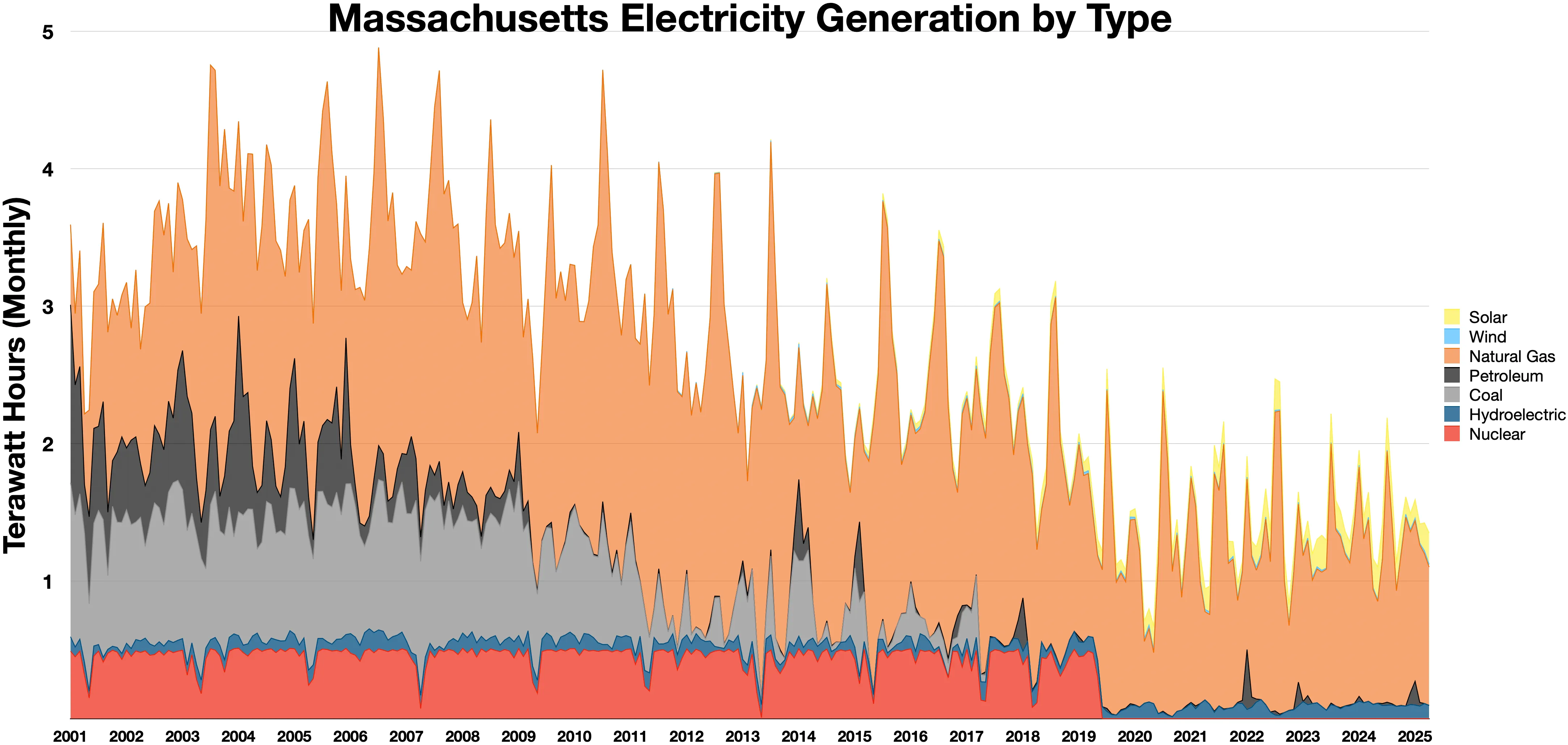
Massachusetts electricity generation by type

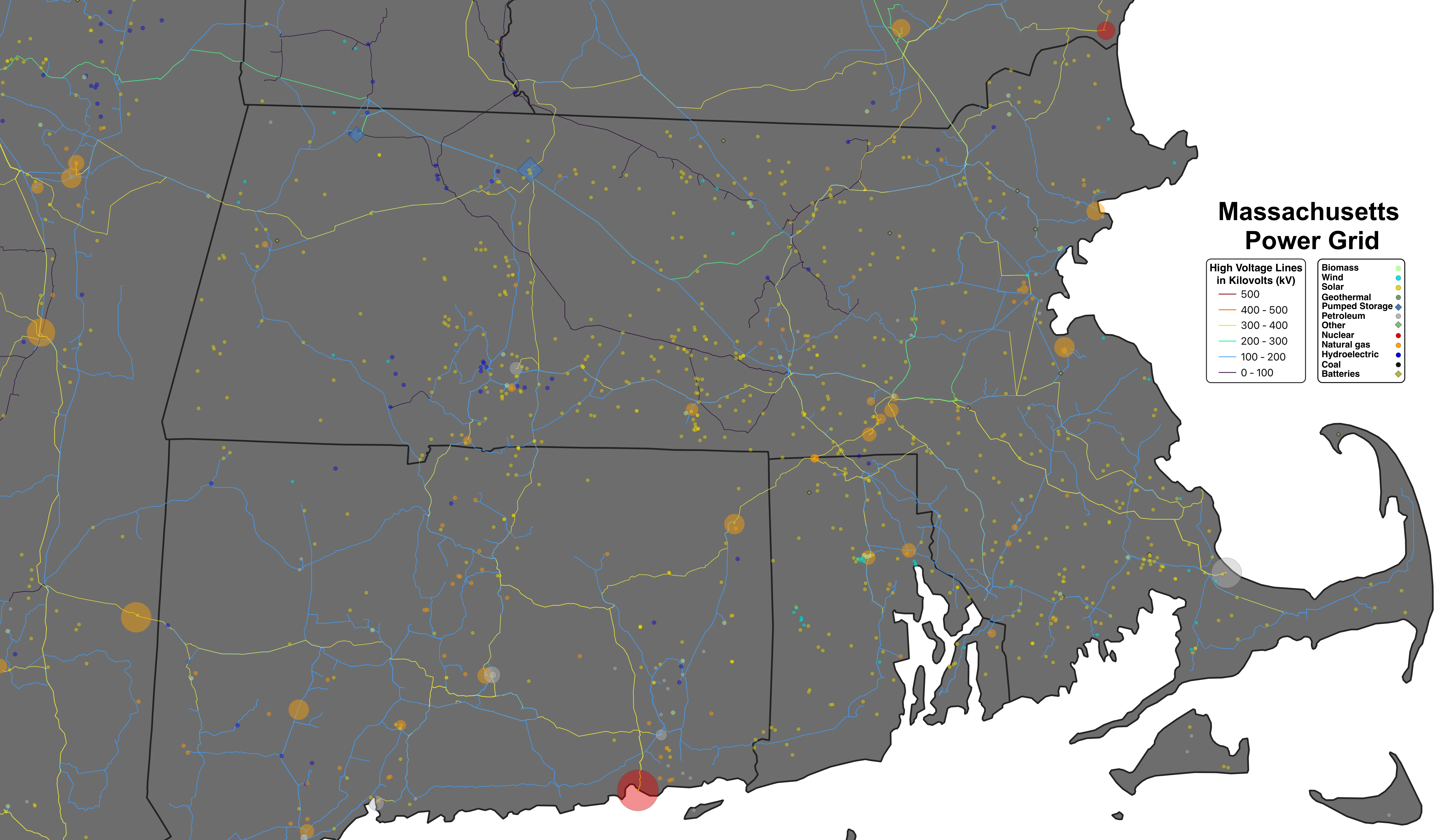
Massachusetts power grid

== Active ==
=== Pumped storage ===
Plant	Capacity (MW)
Bear Swamp	600
Northfield Mountain	1146

=== Natural gas ===
Plant	Capacity (MW)
Amherst College Co Gen	1.7
ANP Bellingham Energy Project	471.7
ANP Blackstone Energy Project	454.8
Bellingham Cogeneration Facility	264
Berkshire Power	229.3
Clark University	2
Dartmouth Power Associates LP	82.6
Dighton Power Plant	164.2
Fore River Generating Station	726
General Electric Aircraft Engines	47.1
Kendall Cogeneration Station	225.7
L'Energia Energy Center	75
Masspower	245
MIT Cogeneration Plant	19
Milford Power LP	148
Millennium Power Plant	334.9
NECCO Co-Generation	5.6
Newark America Mill	3
Pittsfield Generating LP	154.3
Rousselot Inc	6.3
Salem Harbor Power Station	674
Simonds	1.8
Smith College Central Heating Plant	2.7
Southbridge Energy Center LLC	6.5
Waters River	46.6
Wellesley College Central Utility Plant	6.7
Williams College – Campus CHP	3

=== Petroleum ===
Plant	Capacity (MW)
Anderson Power Products Division	1
Canal	1113
Cherry Street	15.3
Doreen	16.6
Exelon Framingham LLC	31.4
Exelon L Street	16
Exelon Medway LLC	123.8
Front Street	8.4
M Street Jet	50
MBTA South Boston	68
Nantucket	5.2
Oak Bluffs Diesel Generating Facility	8.4
West Tisbury Generating Facility	5.6
Wilkins Station	5
Woodland Road	16.7

=== Biomass/Wood ===
Plant	Capacity (MW)
AMERESCO Chicopee Energy	7.7
Covanta Haverhill	42.8
Fitchburg Gas Recovery	4.8
MM Taunton Energy	3.6
Pioneer Valley Resource Recovery	7.5
SEMASS	80
Southbridge Landfill Gas-to-Energy	1.5
Wheelabrator Millbury Facility	40
Wheelabrator North Andover	30
Wheelabrator Saugus	32
Pinetree Power Fitchburg	16

=== Hydropower ===
Plant	Capacity (MW)
Boott Hydropower	21.7
Cabot	61.8
Cobble Mountain	32.6
Deerfield 2	6.3
Deerfield 3	6.3
Deerfield 4	6.3
Deerfield 5	13.9
Fife Brook	11.2
Hadley Falls	30.3
Indian Orchard Hydroelectric	3.7
Lawrence Hydroelectric Associates	14
Pepperell Hydro Power Plant	2.2
Putts Bridge	3.6
Red Bridge	4
Turners Falls	6.4

=== Wind ===
Plant	Capacity (MW)
Applied Materials Wind Turbine	2.5
Bartlett's Ocean View Wind Farm	0.25
Cape Cod Air Force Station – 6 SWS	3.4
Charlestown Wind Turbine	1.5
Hoosac Wind Power Project	28.5
Hull Wind 1	0.66
Hull Wind II	1.8
Ipswich Wind Independence	2
Massachusetts Military Reservation Wind Project	4.5
Mount Wachusett Community College	3.4
Princeton Wind Farm	3
Scituate Wind Turbine	1.5
Town of Falmouth WWTP	1.6
University of MA Wind Turbine	0.6
Winter Island Wind	Unknown
Vineyard 1	804

=== Solar ===
Plant	Capacity (MW)
651 Chase Solar NG	1
Acushnet AD Makepeace	4.7
Acushnet Hawes Reed Road	2
Acushnet- High Hill	3.2
Acushnet-Braley Road 1	1.9
Agawam Solar	1.5
Axio Green LLC	2
Bellingham PV	3
Bolton PV	4.9
Boston Scientific Solar	1.1
Brockelman	3
Cottage Street Solar Facility	3.2
Dartmouth	6.3
Dartmouth II Solar	2
Dartmouth Landfill	1.3
Dartmouth Solar	1.6
Dorchester Solar Site	1
Douglas Solar	2
Easton Landfill	1.9
EBZ Solar	2.5
EDF Lancaster	4.5
Fairview Farms Solar	0.8
Gardner Solar 1	2
Grafton	1.5
Groveland Solar	3.2
Harwich Landfill	4
Haverhill Solar Power Project	0.8
Holyoke Solar Cooperative at Mueller	2.7
Indian Orchard PV Facility	2.3
Katama Farm	1
Lepomis PV Energy LLC	4.5
Ludlow Landfill	2.6
Marshfield PV	3
Mass Midstate Solar 1	5
Mass Midstate Solar 2	5
Mass Midstate Solar 3	4
Maynard PV	1
Merrimac Solar	1.5
Methuen Landfill	1.3
Millbury Solar	3
NEDC Solar Site	0.8
Needham RTS Landfill Solar	3.5
NFM Solar Power LLC	1.9
North Brookfield	3
Northbridge Solar	1.9
Nunnepog	1
Orange PV	2
Padelford Solar	2.2
Pittsburgh Waste Water Treatment Plant	0.3
Plymouth Site 1	5.6
Quittacas Pond Solar	3.5
Rehoboth Solar	2
Revere Solar Site	0.6
Rockland Solar	2.5
Route 57 Solar	1.5
Scituate PV	2.5
Shrewsbury Solar	2.5
Stow PV	2
Sudbury Landfill	1.3
Tihonet Solar	1
Town of East Bridgewater	2
Town of Uxbridge MA at Commerce Dr	1.8
True North	4.8
Walpole Solar 2	2.4
Westford Solar Park	4
Whately Solar	1.5
Wilson Solar	2

=== Other Active Power Plants ===
Plant	Capacity (MW)	Type
Indian Orchard Hydroelectric	3.7	Hydropower
MBTA South Boston [Primarily Transit Backup Power]	68	Petroleum (No. 2 Fuel Oil)
Northeastern University Cogeneration		Cogeneration

== Retired ==
Plant	Capacity (MW)	Type	Year
Brayton Point Power Station	1538	Coal	2017
Edison Power Plant (same site as Exelon New Boston Generating Station / Exelon L Street, 776 Summer Street, Boston)		Petroleum	
Mount Tom Station	136	Coal	2014
Boston Edison Company’s Charles L. Edgar Station (same site as Fore River Generating Station)	~140	Coal	1970
Mystic Generating Station	2001.9	Natural gas, petroleum	2024
NAEA Energy Massachusetts LLC (West Springfield Generating Station)	193.9	Natural gas, petroleum	2022
Pilgrim Nuclear Power Station	677	Nuclear	2019
Reading Municipal Light and Power Station		Coal	1925
Somerset Power Plant	174	Coal	2010
Yankee Rowe Nuclear Power Station	185	Nuclear	1992

== Future ==
Plant	Capacity (MW)	Type	Year
South Coast Wind	1287 (1087 for MA, 200 for RI)	Offshore-Wind	2030

== See also ==
- List of power stations in the United States
