= Everett Woodel =

American government official

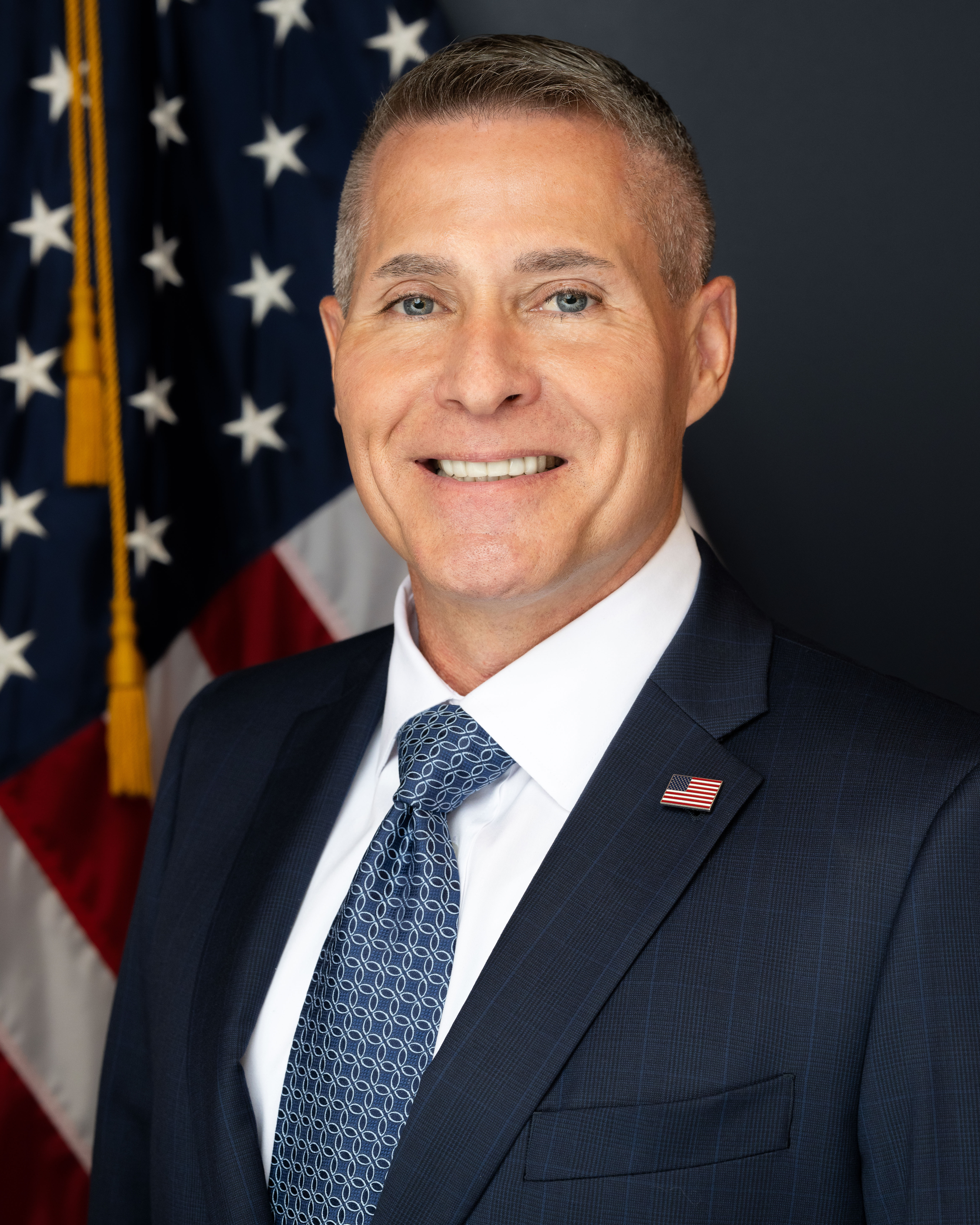

Acting Chief Counsel for Advocacy
- Incumbent
- Assumed office 2026
- President: Donald Trump

Acting Administrator of the Small Business Administration
- In office January 20, 2025 – February 20, 2025
- Preceded by: Isabel Guzman
- Succeeded by: Kelly Loeffler

Personal details
- Education: Bowling Green State University (BS); Ohio University (MBA)

Military service
- Allegiance: United States
- Branch/service: United States Army

Everett M. Woodel, Jr. is an American government official who is the U.S. Small Business Administration’s (SBA) Great Lakes Regional Administrator. He oversees the SBA District Offices in the six-state Great Lakes Region that includes Illinois, Indiana, Michigan, Minnesota, Ohio and Wisconsin. His appointment started on March 3, 2025.

Prior to being Regional Administrator, Woodel served for six years as the SBA District Director for the Columbus District Office, which serves Central and Southern Ohio. In this role, he oversaw programs that facilitated billions in small business lending and federal contracting.

On January 20, 2025, Everett was designated by President Donald J. Trump to be the acting Administrator of the U.S. Small Business Administration until the confirmation of current Administrator Kelly Loeffler in February 2025.

== Biography ==
Woodel received his bachelor's degree in education from Bowling Green State University and his MBA from Ohio University. He is a U.S. Army veteran.

Prior to joining the SBA, Woodel was Ohio regional director for Vermont Energy Investment Corporation, an energy efficiency nonprofit, and Director of Business Development at American Structurepoint, Inc. He also held leadership positions in Ohio state government, including Director of Public Affairs for the Ohio Treasurer’s Office and Director of Operations for the Industrial Commission of Ohio. Additionally, he spent over a decade in congressional service as District Director and Deputy Communications Director for Ohio’s Fifth Congressional District.

As of July 22, 2026 Woodel serves as Acting Chief Counsel for Advocacy within the SBA.

Political offices
Preceded by Isabel Guzman	Administrator of the Small Business Administration; Acting; 2025	Succeeded by Kelly Loeffler
