= Energy in Vermont =

Vermont electric power needs are served by over twenty utilities. The largest is Green Mountain Power, a subsidiary of Énergir which recently also took over Central Vermont Public Service. Together this single company represents 70% of the retail customers in Vermont. The state is a small electricity consumer compared with other states. Therefore, its electricity sector has the lowest carbon footprint in the country. As of 2010, the state had the lowest wholesale electricity costs in New England. Efficiency Vermont engages in aggressive initiatives to cut residential electricity waste, which often identifies other problems (leaks, pest entry points, mold, rot) that it claims can save hundreds per household per year. Accordingly, Vermont's overall energy bills are also relatively lower than in the rest of the New England states.

Vermont's transmission grid is linked by 1,300 miles (2,100 km) of optical fiber cable, which is available not only for smart grid applications but also for connectivity purposes for Vermont communities. The state-owned transmission utility VELCO (Vermont Electric Power Company) has marketed this capacity for municipal broadband, WISP and commercial ISPs as backhaul.

== Vehicle fuels ==
Vermont, like most of the US, relies on gasoline and diesel as primary vehicle fuels. Electric vehicle charging stations are still uncommon in rural areas, and electric vehicles (whose batteries are affected by cold climates) are not in widespread use.

== Industrial and agricultural uses ==
Direct utilization of wind, water, sun and geothermal power by industrial plants and mills is now very uncommon in the state except for a few artisan or demonstration or museum projects. Windmills are still used for water pumping in some areas but increasingly this generates electricity to drive an on-demand pump, rather than operating only when the wind is blowing.

== Electricity ==
=== Grid ===
Vermont has one of the most sophisticated smart grid implementations in the United States. In 2012 the state, VELCO and all 20 distribution utilities built (with contractor IBM) a 17-terabit-capable dark fiber optic network to all electrical substations in Vermont, at a cost of about $53 million recovered from operations savings (mostly prevention of outages). By contrast with other smart grid initiatives in Tennessee and Virginia, where universal wired fiber communication connectivity was a major goal, VELCO cited its internal "high-bandwidth, two-way communication requirements [for] synchophasors" and latency-sensitive protocols that respond to shifts in demand in under 50ms (one-twentieth of a second) to prevent problems.

About 1,300 miles (2,100 km) of fiber was deployed to 65 substations, reaching nearly 70 percent of Vermont's towns. This capacity was considered in setting Vermont's 10-year Telecommunications Plan that would "essentially require fiber optic broadband speeds to every Vermont home by 2024" as mandated by the National Broadband Plan (United States). Providers like ECFiber have reached many Vermont towns using public backhaul already. In 2015 the FCC ruled in favour of public and thus also ratepayer subsidies that achieve economic development goals. Accordingly, there was no regulatory barrier to deploying grid fiber for this need.

=== Supply ===
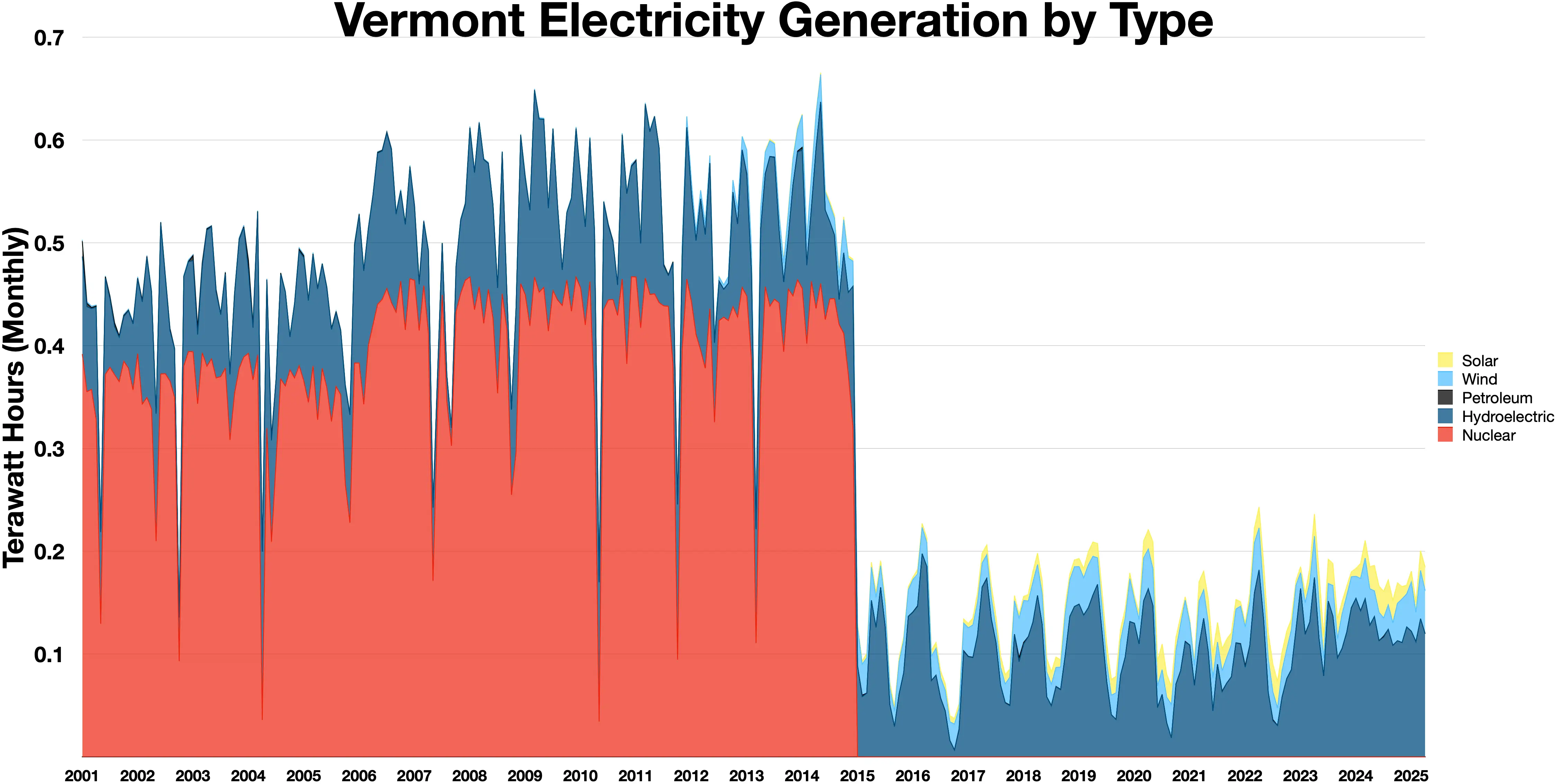
electricity generation by type

In 2013, the total summer generating capacity of Vermont was 1,235 megawatts.

==== Imports ====
Since the 1980s, the state has turned to Quebec, its northern neighbor, to fulfill part of its energy needs. A first long-term supply contract has been signed between Vermont utilities and government-owned Hydro-Québec on July 25, 1984. The contract was renewed for 26 years in a deal signed in 2010.

Despite the closing of Vermont Yankee, the state continued to rely on nuclear fission power imported from Seabrook Station Nuclear Power Plant in NH.

==== Renewable energy ====
In May 2009, Vermont created the first statewide renewable energy feed-in law. In 2010, there were about 150 methane digesters in the nation, Vermont led the nation with six online.

The state has 78 hydro power dams with a combined capacity of 143 MW, about 12 percent of the state's total requirement. Vermont experts estimate that the state has the capacity to ultimately generate from 134 to 175 MW of electricity from hydro power.

=== Transmission ===
All Vermont utilities get their power from lines run by ISO New England. Each utility pays a share of transmitting power over these lines. Vermont's share is about 4.5 percent. A unique aspect of Vermont's electric power system is the Vermont Electric Power Company (VELCO.) VELCO is a utility that's sole purpose is to maintain the state's main transmission lines which move power through the state and deliver it to the various customer-facing utilities' systems throughout the state. VELCO is owned collectively by the state's customer-facing utilities and operates the higher voltage 115 kV, 345 kV, and HVDC lines throughout the state as well as the major transmission substations. The customer facing utilities, such as Green Mountain Power, maintain lower voltage subtransmission lines (below 69 kV) which bring power from the major VELCO transmission substations to smaller distribution substations as well as the distribution lines that bring power from substations to customers.

=== Demand ===
In 2005, the inhabitants of the state used an average of 5,883 kilowatt hours of electricity per capita. Another source says that each household consumed 7,100 kilowatt-hours annually in 2008.

Retail sales in 2013 totalled 5.5 million MWh.

=== Retail industry structure ===
Vermont does not allow customers to shop for competitive energy suppliers. The state's sole investor owned utility, Green Mountain Power (GMP), serves about 80 percent of Vermont's customers. The remaining customers are served by two non-profit cooperative utilities and 14 municipal utilities. GMP became the state's largest power company through its merger with Central Vermont Public Service (CVPS) in 2012.

=== Cost (to consumer) ===
While Vermont paid the lowest rates in New England for power in 2007, it was still ranked among the highest eleven states in the nation; about 16 percent higher than the national average. In 2017, retail electric rates were $.17 per kwh, in direct contrast to rates in other states such as Delaware, where retail rates were $.07-.09 per kwh. In 2009, the state had the highest energy rates for energy (including heating) in the US and the worst affordability gap nationwide.

The state's strategy to reduce costs focused on reliability, outages and maintenance, including the rollout of one of the best-connected smart grid infrastructures in the US, at a cost of $53 million, paid back entirely by such savings, starting in 2012. Increased economic activity due to reliable power and broadband was expected to further spread costs of maintenance of rural power networks across a larger tax base.

Efficiency Vermont estimates that about $300/year in savings can be achieved simply by monitoring power use effectively via passive device replacements and by monitoring enabled by home automation or by smart meters. In the above comparison, if Vermont were to deregulate the electric market and allow outside electric suppliers to bid on providing energy, such as Delaware, a family who uses 1,000 kwh per month could see a 50% reduction in their bill, or $90 per month, or $1080 per year. This far surpasses the Efficiency Vermont target. The state has been aggressive in assisting persons exposed to peak pricing to identify waste and remove it, and focused on reduction of the overall energy bill rather than on reducing rates.

== History ==
=== James Bay ===
Vermont become embroiled in the controversy regarding James Bay hydroelectric developments by Hydro Quebec in the 1980s and 1990s. It was one of the customers that refused to buy imported power from Quebec until the James Bay Cree and Inuit had signed an agreement. By 2010 these issues were considered fully settled and a comprehensive agreement between Quebec and Vermont guaranteed the latter a reliable supply of hydroelectric power via the massive HQ transmission corridor.

=== Vermont Yankee ===
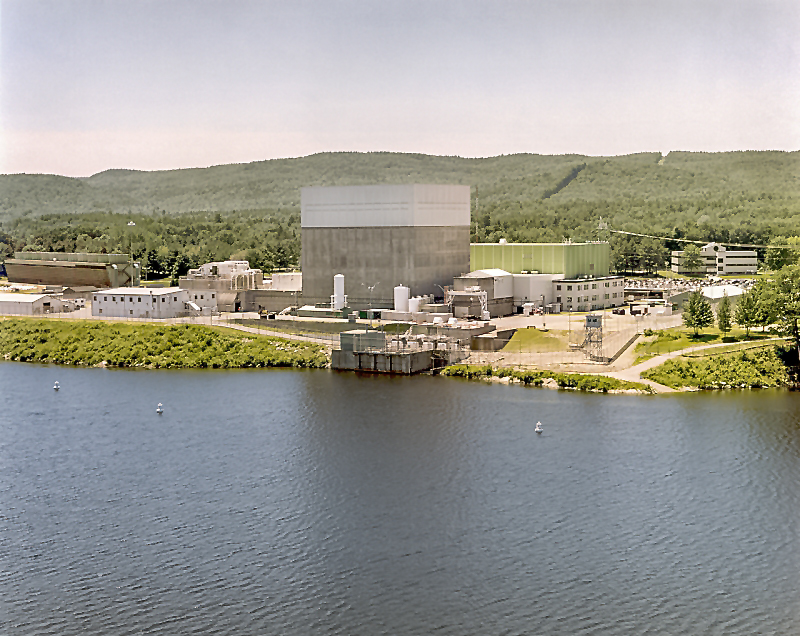
The Vermont Yankee Nuclear Power Plant, in Vernon.

The Vermont Yankee Nuclear Power Plant was commissioned in 1972.

Vermont through the 2010s had the highest rate of nuclear-generated power in the nation, 73.7 percent. Vermont was also one of only two states with no coal-fired power plants, which nuclear proponents often cited as a reason to keep it open.

Anti-nuclear political pressure ramped up after Three Mile Island accident, Chernobyl and especially the Fukushima nuclear disaster in March 2011.

As of 2010, most of the energy was purchased wholesale for distribution from Vermont Yankee nuclear power plant and Hydro-Québec. The costs at Vermont Yankee were about 3 to 5 cents per kilowatt hour.

In August 2013, Entergy announced that economic factors, notably the lower cost of electricity provided by competing natural gas-fired power plants, forced it to cease operations and schedule the decommissioning of the plant, which happened at the end of 2014. The plant closed eighteen years before its current operating license was set to expire on March 21, 2032.

== See also ==
- Energy in the United States
- Green Mountain Energy (Texas, formerly Vermont)
