= Fore River =

Fore River may refer to:

- Fore River (Maine), an estuary, separating Portland and South Portland in Maine
- Fore River (Massachusetts), a.k.a. Weymouth Fore River
  - Fore River Shipyard, Massachusetts
- Fore River (soccer), an amateur U.S. soccer team
