= Cochato River =

River in Massachusetts, United States

Coordinates: 42.195°N 71.013°W

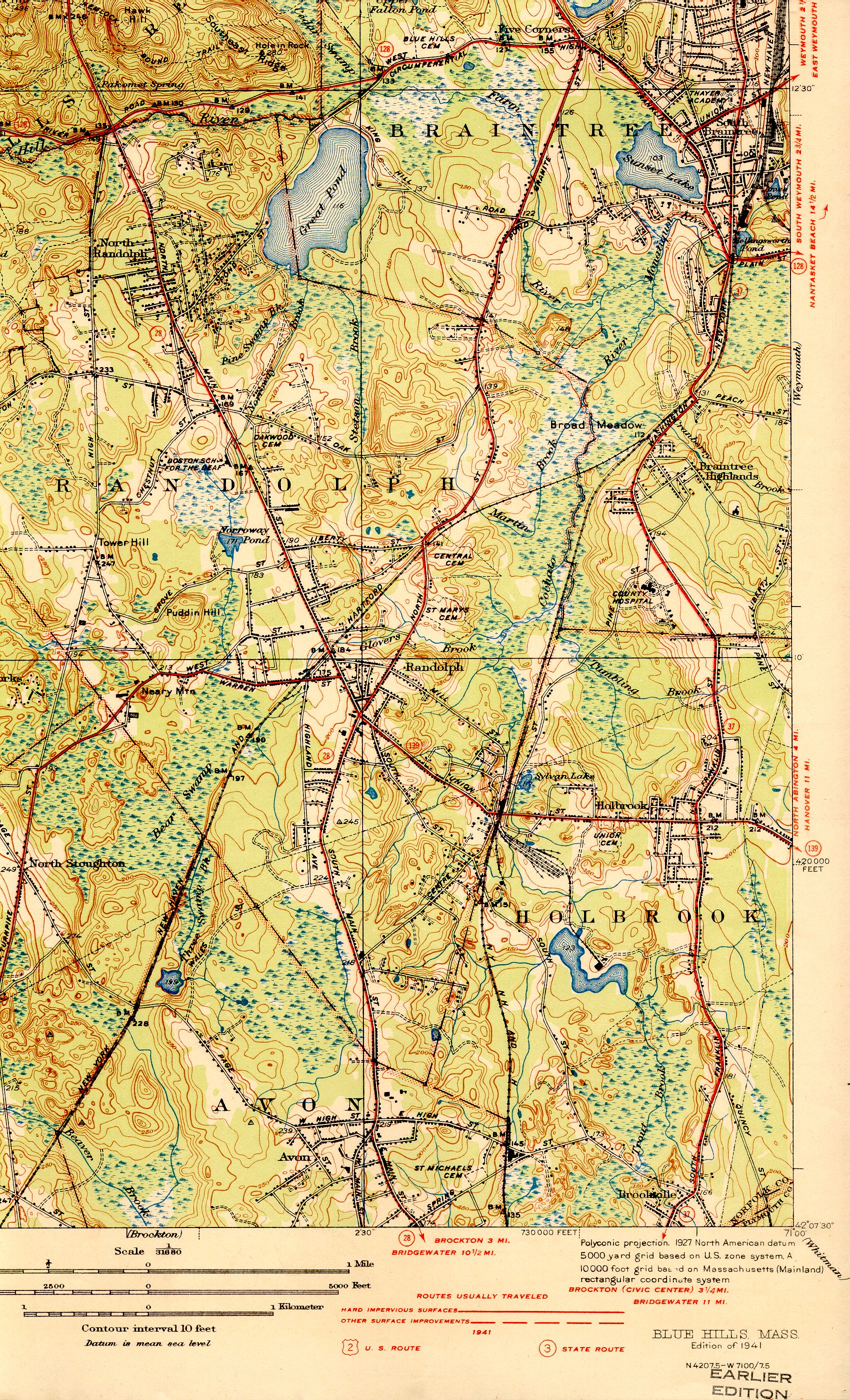
Colchato River and environs

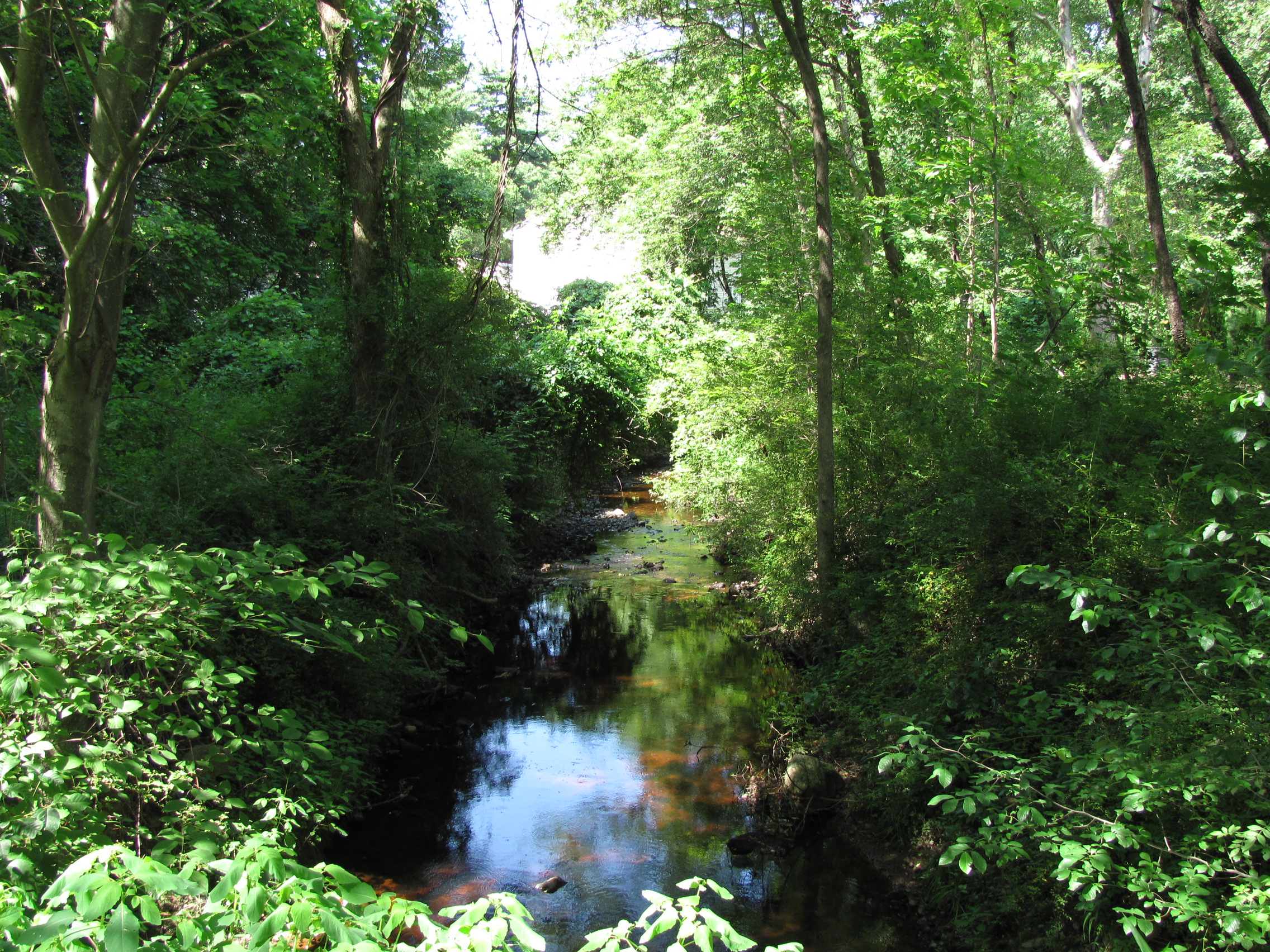
Cochato River at Lancaster Road in Randolph

The Cochato River is a stream rising from Avon, Massachusetts and running several miles north to its confluence with the Monatiquot River in Braintree. It is part of the Weymouth Fore River watershed and empties into Boston Harbor. The river serves as the boundary between Braintree and Randolph.

The river previously fed the Richardi Reservoir, a water system serving nearly 90,000 people in the Towns of Holbrook, Randolph, and Braintree. This use ended in the 1980s, however, due to severe pollution from the Baird & McGuire company.

From 1912 to 1983, the Baird & McGuire chemical manufacturing facility was operated near the river in Holbrook, manufacturing products such as pesticides, disinfectants, soaps, and solvents. Between 1954 and 1977, the company was fined at least 35 times by various state and federal agencies for numerous violations. Because of their poor storage and disposal practices, industrial waste was discharged into the soil, river, wetlands, and a gravel pit. The facility was closed in 1983 and declared a "superfund" site. The Environmental Protection Agency dredged and treated over 4,000 cubic yards (3,100 m^{3}) of sediments in the Cochato, with cleanup completed in 1997. The river has been monitored since that time.
