= Salem Harbor Power Station =

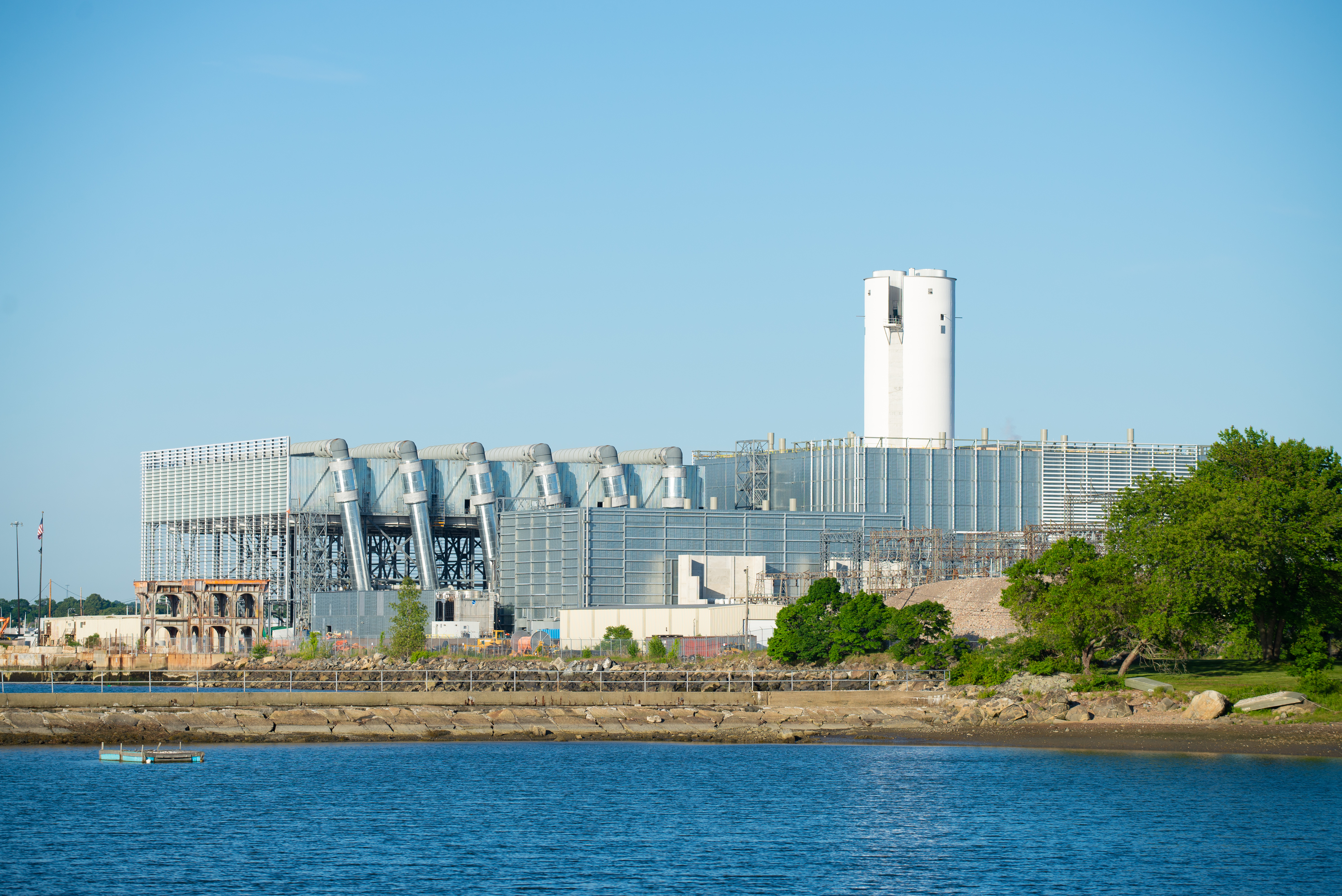
- Current facility built by Footprint Power
- Country: United States
- Location: Salem, Massachusetts
- Coordinates: 42°31′34.73″N 70°52′35.42″W
- Status: Decommissioned
- Decommission date: June 2014

Power generation
- Nameplate capacity: 805.1 MW

External links
- Commons: Related media on Commons

Salem Harbor Power Station is a natural gas-fired power plant located in Salem, Massachusetts. It replaced an outdated coal-fired plant on the same site and went online in May 2018.

The facility sits on land reclaimed during the 1800s, and was previously the site of a wharf and coal depository. Construction on the original plant began in the 1950s, and was expanded numerous times.

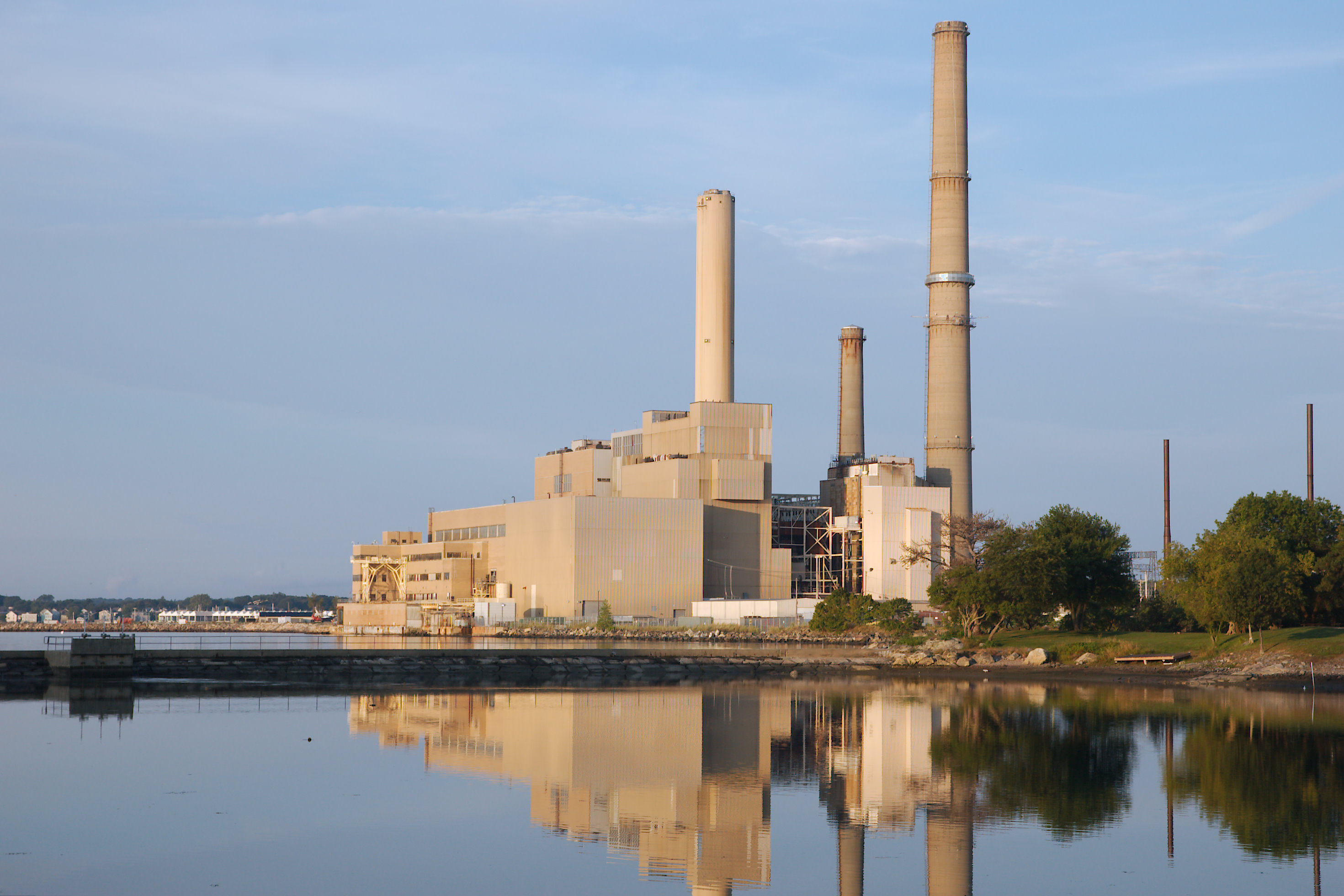
Original coal-fired plant in 2012

It is smaller than the original plant, allowing 40 acres (16 ha) of waterfront land to be used for future development. The 60-year-old coal plant, which was purchased by Footprint Power in 2012, was brought offline on May 31, 2014. Demolition work was completed in 2016, while the new plant was being built around it.

On March 23, 2022, the development company filed for Chapter 11 bankruptcy.

== See also ==
- List of power stations in Massachusetts
