= Mystic Generating Station =

Electric generating station near Boston, Massachusetts

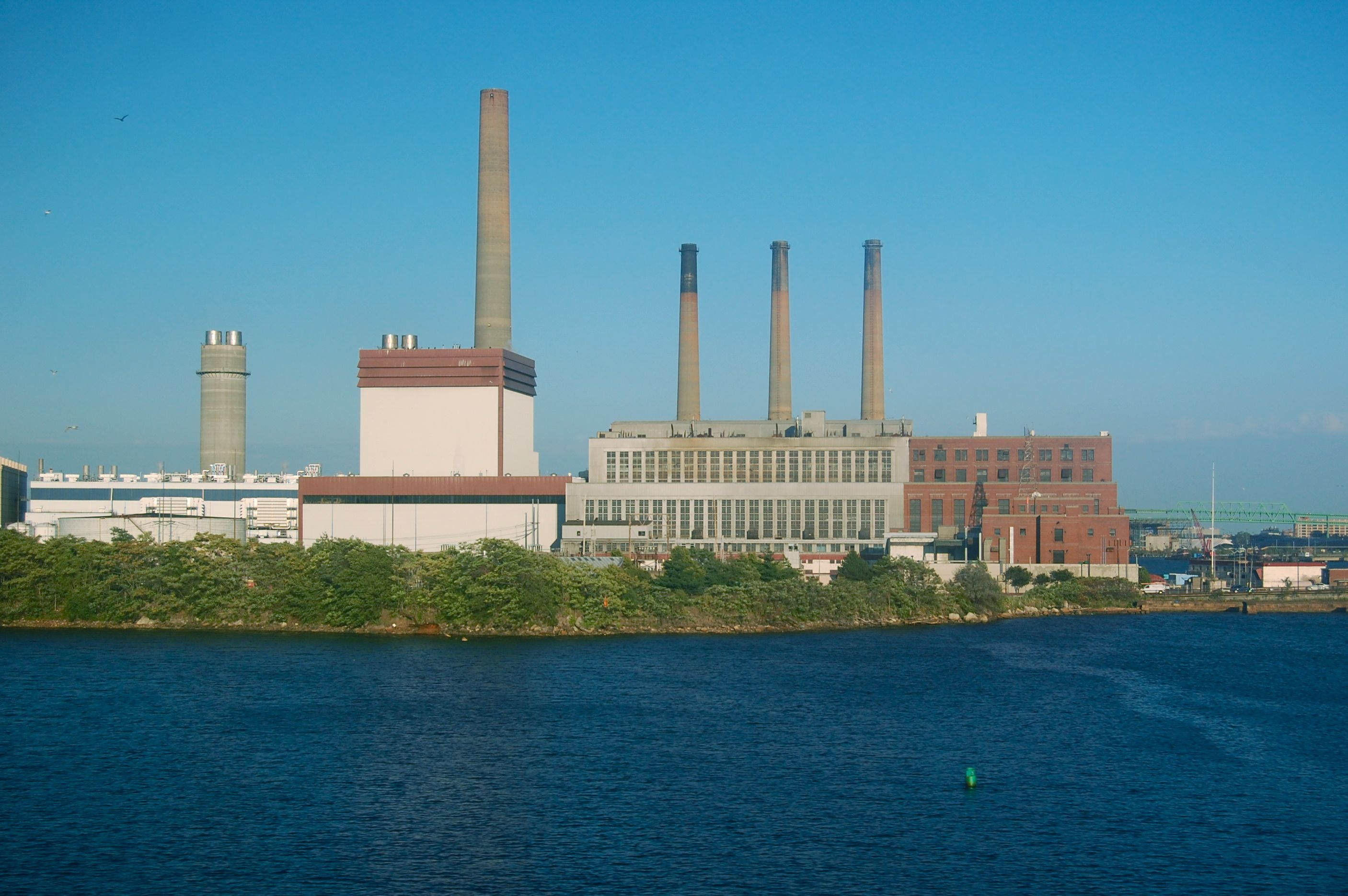
- Mystic Generating Station from across the Mystic River
- Country: United States
- Location: Everett, Massachusetts
- Coordinates: 42°23′29″N 71°04′01″W
- Status: Being decommissioned
- Decommission date: June 2024
- Owner: Constellation Energy
- Operator: Constellation Energy

Power generation
- Nameplate capacity: 1,998 MW

External links
- Website: Official Website
- Commons: Related media on Commons

The Mystic Generating Station was a power station in the state of Massachusetts (on the border between Everett and Boston) which, for a while, had the highest nameplate capacity of any station in the state. It was capable of burning both natural gas and petroleum, but mostly burned natural gas.

As of 2024 the plant consisted of eight separate generating units: Mystic 8 and 9 were combined cycle natural gas units with a total of four combustion turbines and two steam turbines which could produce 1414 MW total; Mystic 7 was a natural gas or petroleum unit which produced 576 MW; and Mystic Jet was a small petroleum fueled unit which produced 8.6 MW in periods of high demand. Mystic Generating Station was retired on June 1, 2024.

== History ==
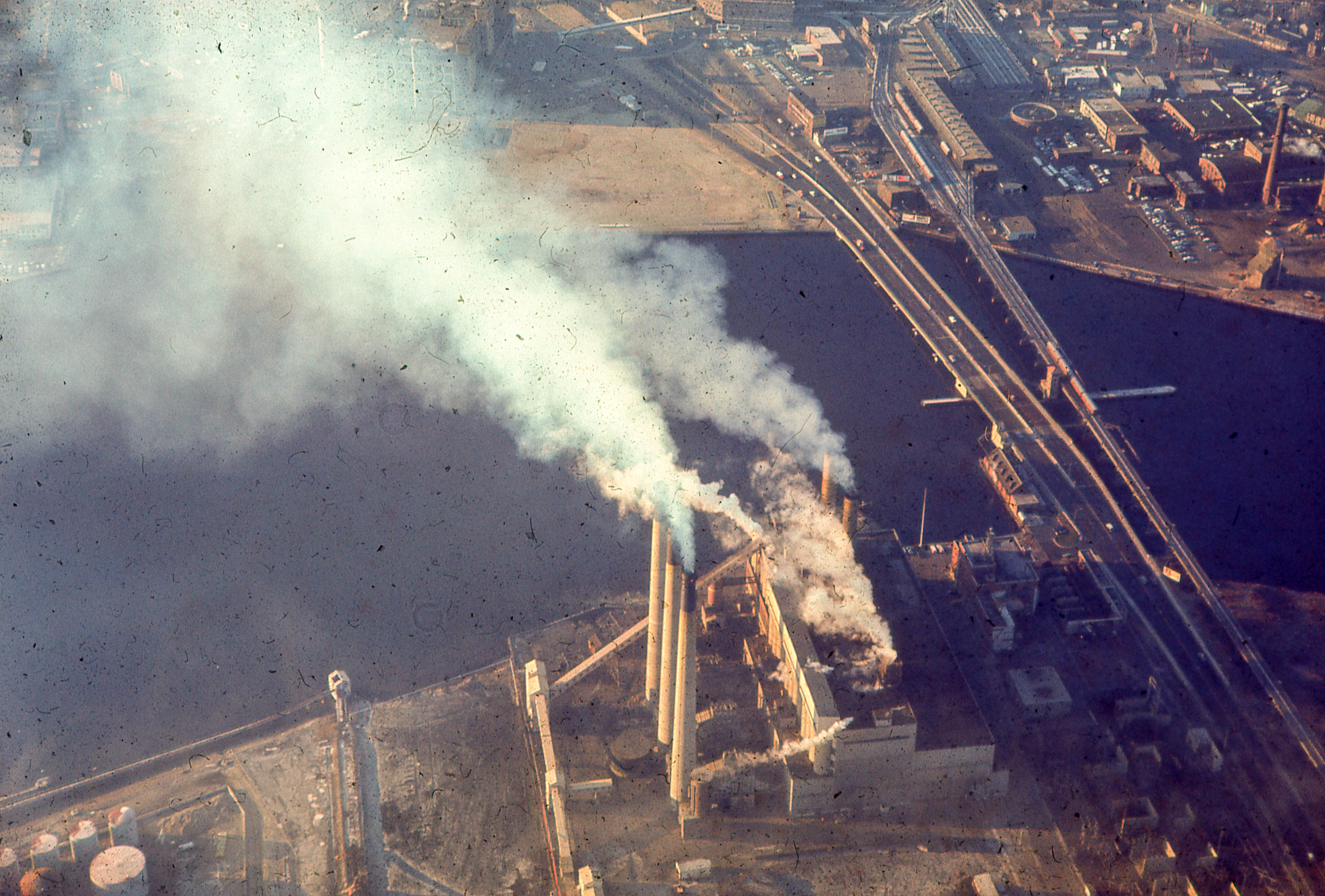
A circa-1960s aerial view showing Mystic 4–6 in operation

As World War II loomed, the increase in demand for electricity lead Boston Edison to plan new power stations. Mystic Station, located on the Mystic River, began operations with three coal fired units of 50 MW each (Mystic 1-3), which went into service in 1943, 1945, and 1947, respectively.

Three additional coal fired units (Mystic 4-6) having a combined output of 468 MW were added in 1957, 1959, and 1961, respectively. Units 1-6 were later converted to oil.

Mystic 7, a dual fuel unit (natural gas or petroleum) rated at 577.6 MW and Mystic Jet, a small petroleum fueled 8.6 MW unit for black start and peaking were constructed in 1975. Mystic 1-3 were then retired.

In the mid 1990s, the state of Massachusetts began to deregulate the electrical market. Boston Edison, then called NSTAR, sold the Mystic Generating Station to Sithe Energies, while it retained possession of the transmission and distribution switchyards. Sithe instituted a large capital investment with the construction of Mystic 8 and 9, six natural gas units which produced a total 690.9 MW, which was completed in 2003. Units 4-6 were subsequently retired.

Sithe was acquired by Exelon in late 2003 who ran into financial difficulties, which resulted in BNP Paribas taking control of the station. BNP Paribas sold the station soon after its acquisition to Boston Generating, who subsequently declared Chapter 11 bankruptcy in 2010 and was sold to Constellation Energy. Constellation Energy and Exelon merged in March 2012, returning ownership to Exelon. Constellation owned and operated the station following spin-off from Exelon in 2022.

The Toxics Action Center had targeted the Mystic Generating Station as one of the five largest polluting power stations in the state. Other groups also became concerned that the plant relied too heavily on Distrigas Liquefied Natural Gas from Yemen which has been experiencing political unrest.

Mystic Unit 7 and Mystic Jet were shut down May 31, 2021.

Changes in the wholesale energy markets left Mystic uneconomical to operate under most conditions, leading Exelon to apply to close Mystic from 2022. ISO New England ordered units 8 and 9 to remain operational until the transmission system could be upgraded under a FERC Order 1000 competitive solicitation. Once an upgrade project was selected ISO-NE announced that Mystic Station would be allowed to fully retire on June 1, 2024. Mystic Generating Station's peaking capabilities were replaced by transmission grid enhancements built on existing National Grid and Eversource properties, a solution known as "Ready Path".

In March 2023, Wynn Resorts acquired 45 acres of the site for $25,000,000, planning to build a standalone sportsbook, poker room, nightclub and possibly a hotel tower on the property.

Mystic Generating Station was shut down on June 1, 2024.

== See also ==
- List of largest power stations in the United States
- List of power stations in Massachusetts
