= Somerset Power Plant =

Montaup Electric Company
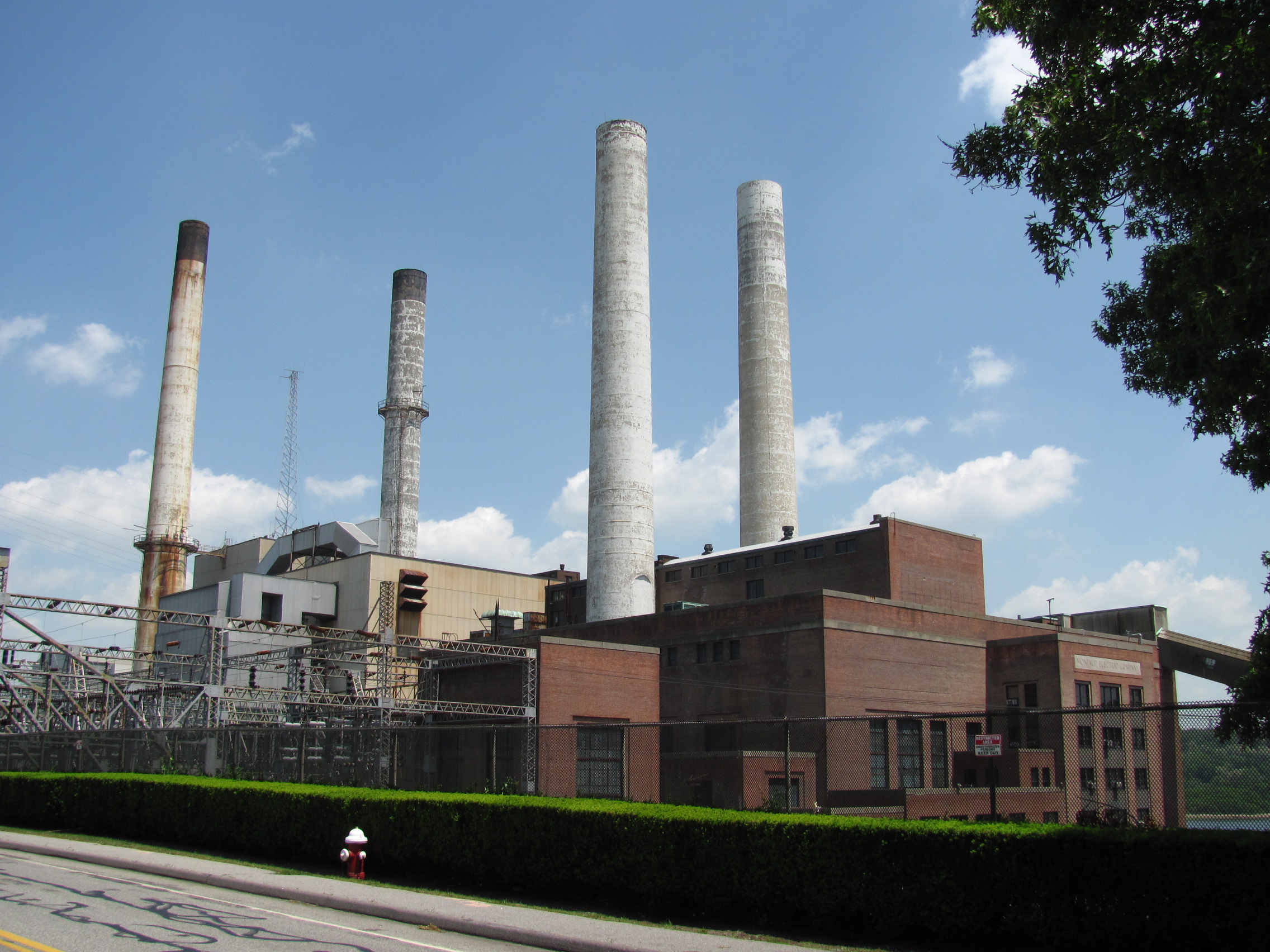
- Somerset Power Plant
- Country: United States
- Location: Somerset, Massachusetts
- Coordinates: 41°44′16″N 71°08′42″W
- Status: Vacant Waiting Its Fate
- Commission date: 1925
- Decommission date: 2010
- Owner: Asset Recovery Group of New Jersey

Power generation
- Nameplate capacity: 125 MW

External links
- Commons: Related media on Commons

Montaup Electric Company , or Somerset Power LLC, was a coal- and oil-fired power plant located in Somerset, Massachusetts, USA. The plant was closed in 2010, and was owned by Asset Recovery Group of New Jersey but was auctioned off and purchased by William Thibeault in 2013. The plant was slated for eventual demolition and redevelopment of the site but since it has been under new ownership, its final purpose has yet to be decided.

== See also ==
- List of power stations in Massachusetts
