= Mount Tom Station =

Former power plant in Massachusetts

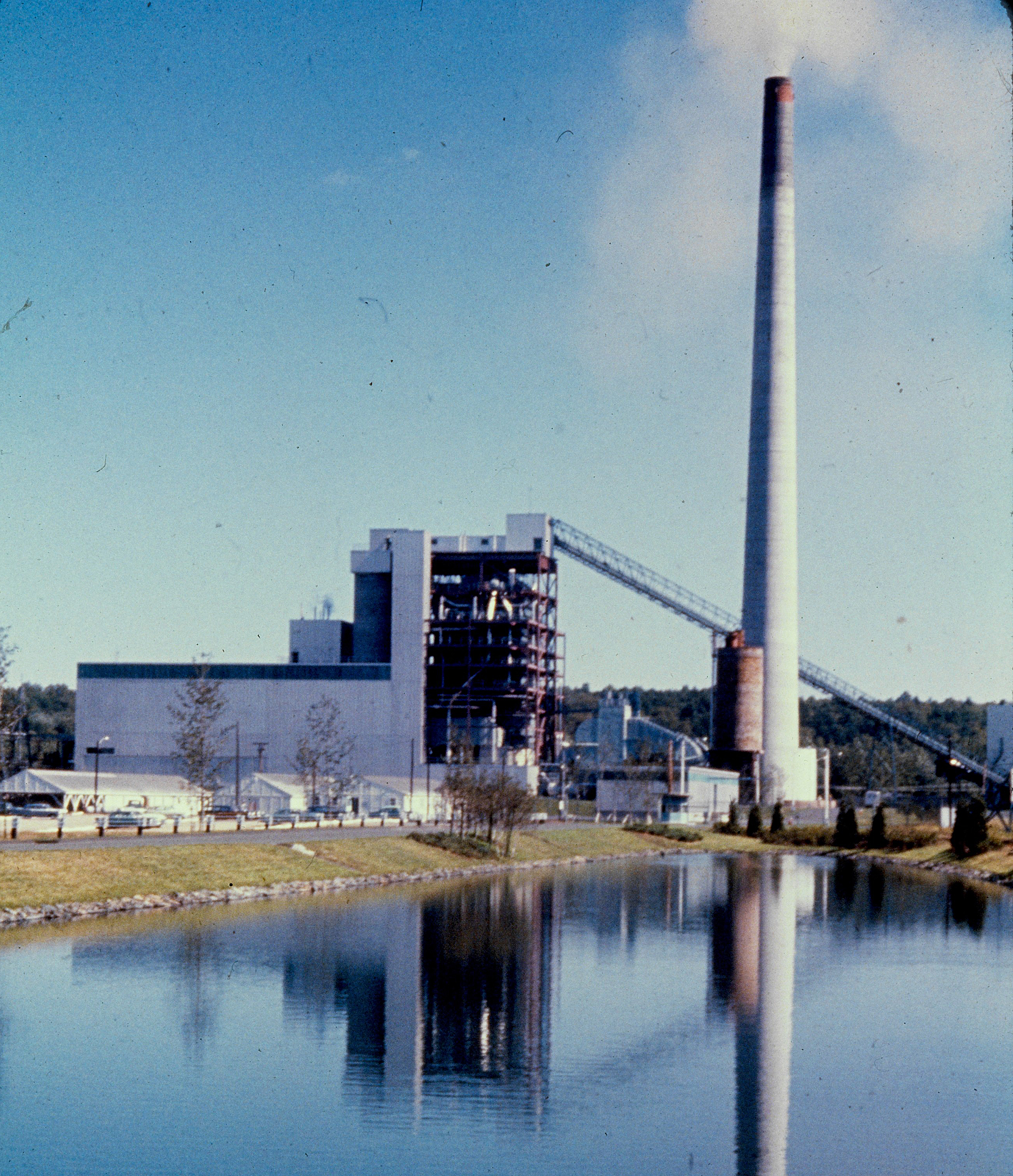
- Country: United States
- Location: Holyoke, Massachusetts
- Coordinates: 42°16′52″N 72°36′18″W
- Status: Decommissioned
- Commission date: 1960
- Decommission date: 2014

Power generation
- Nameplate capacity: 136 MW

External links
- Commons: Related media on Commons

The Mount Tom Station was a coal-fired power plant located in Holyoke, Massachusetts. It was the last coal-fired plant in Western Massachusetts before its closure in December 2014.

== History ==
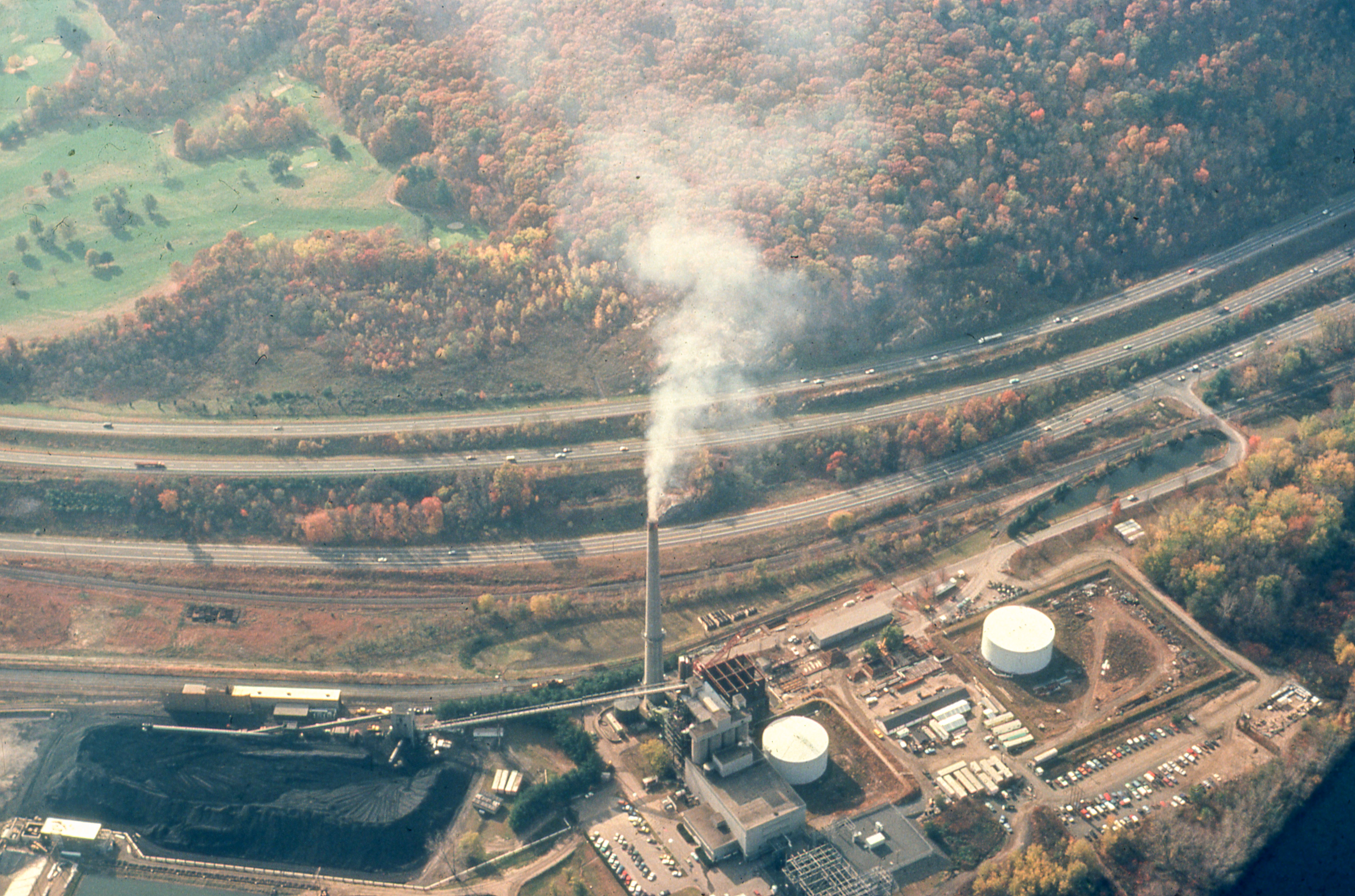
Mount Tom Station as it appeared in an MA Dept. of Environmental Quality Engineering (DEQE) and EPA survey, November 1982

The plant was opened in 1960, and was briefly converted to run on oil for ten years after 1970, before returning to burning coal. Starting in 2009, it no longer became profitable to run the station except in times of high demand due to the natural gas boom in the United States. The boom has resulted in the price of coal growing relative to the price of natural gas which makes coal generation less competitive.

In 2014, GDF SUEZ Energy North America, the owner of the plant (via FirstLight Power Resources), announced that they would be closing the plant later that year citing economic concerns. The boiler structure was imploded by Controlled Demolition, Inc. on November 11, 2018 and the final structure, the smokestack, was imploded August 6, 2019. The switching station, owned by Eversource Energy, remained in place.

In October 2016, a 5.76 megawatt solar array was erected on the property. It produces enough power for 1,000 homes and is coupled with a battery storage facility that has 3 to 5 megawatts of capacity.

== See also ==
- List of power stations in Massachusetts

== External ==
Media related to Mount Tom Station at Wikimedia Commons
