= Monatiquot River =

Location
- Country: United States

Physical characteristics
- Source
  - location: Braintree, Massachusetts
  - elevation: 30 feet (9 m)
- Mouth
  - location: Weymouth Fore River
  - coordinates: 42°13′25″N 70°58′03″W
  - elevation: sea level
- Length: 4.9 mi (7.9 km)
- Basin size: 28.7 mi^{2} (74 km^{2})

The Monatiquot River is a 4.9-mile-long (7.9 km) river in Braintree, Massachusetts, formed by the confluence of the Farm River and Cochato River (42°11′41″N 71°00′46″W) in the Braintree Municipal Golf Course, flowing in swampy meanders to the northeast, and emptying into the tidal Weymouth Fore River estuary. The name roughly translates to either “at the deep tidal place” or “lookout place”. Its drainage area is 28.7 square miles (74 km^{2}).

The river was a key aspect of colonial Braintree for its river herring. Later its strong flow was useful for early industry such as grist mills. It has remained a relatively clean river to date, with wildlife including birds, turtles, muskrats and fish, but recently has been polluted by sediments from the Graziano Inc. concrete batching operation.

The river was also where Paul Revere opened a nail mill, which remained open after his death until the 1860s, when the Mill was retooled. That nail company has since moved to southeastern Massachusetts and is still in business today producing nails on the same equipment installed during that 1860s retooling.

The river is home to a variety of aquatic life. Rainbow smelt use the river as a spawning ground and the smelt that spawn here provide fishing opportunities in the surrounding area.

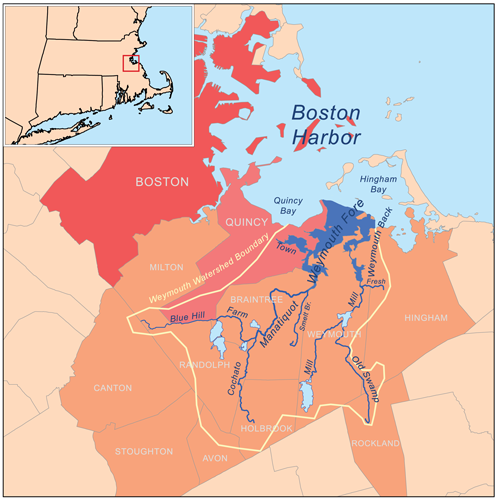
Weymouth watershed

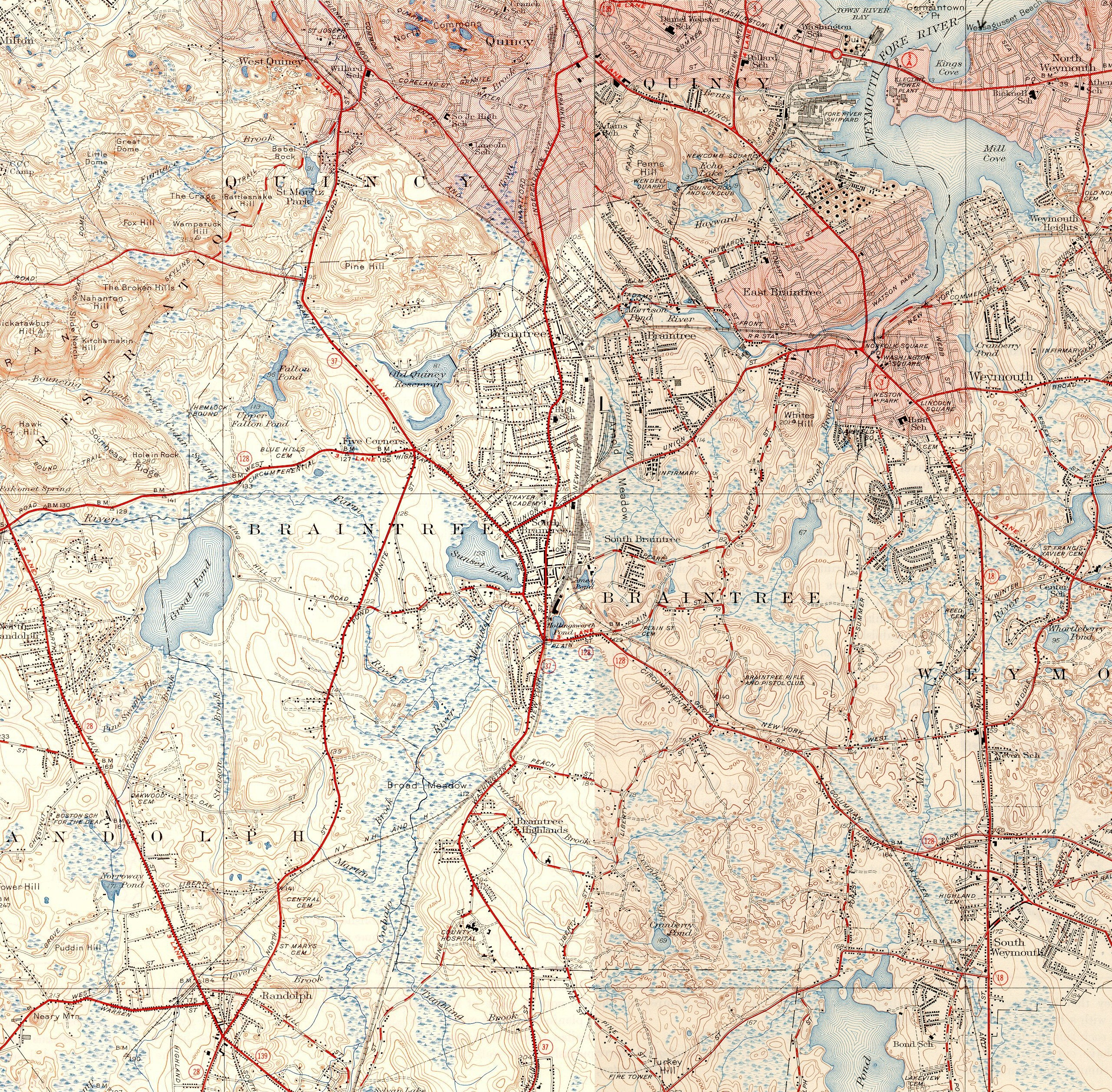
Monatiquot River and environs
