= Vermont Energy Investment Corporation =

American non-profit organization

VEIC
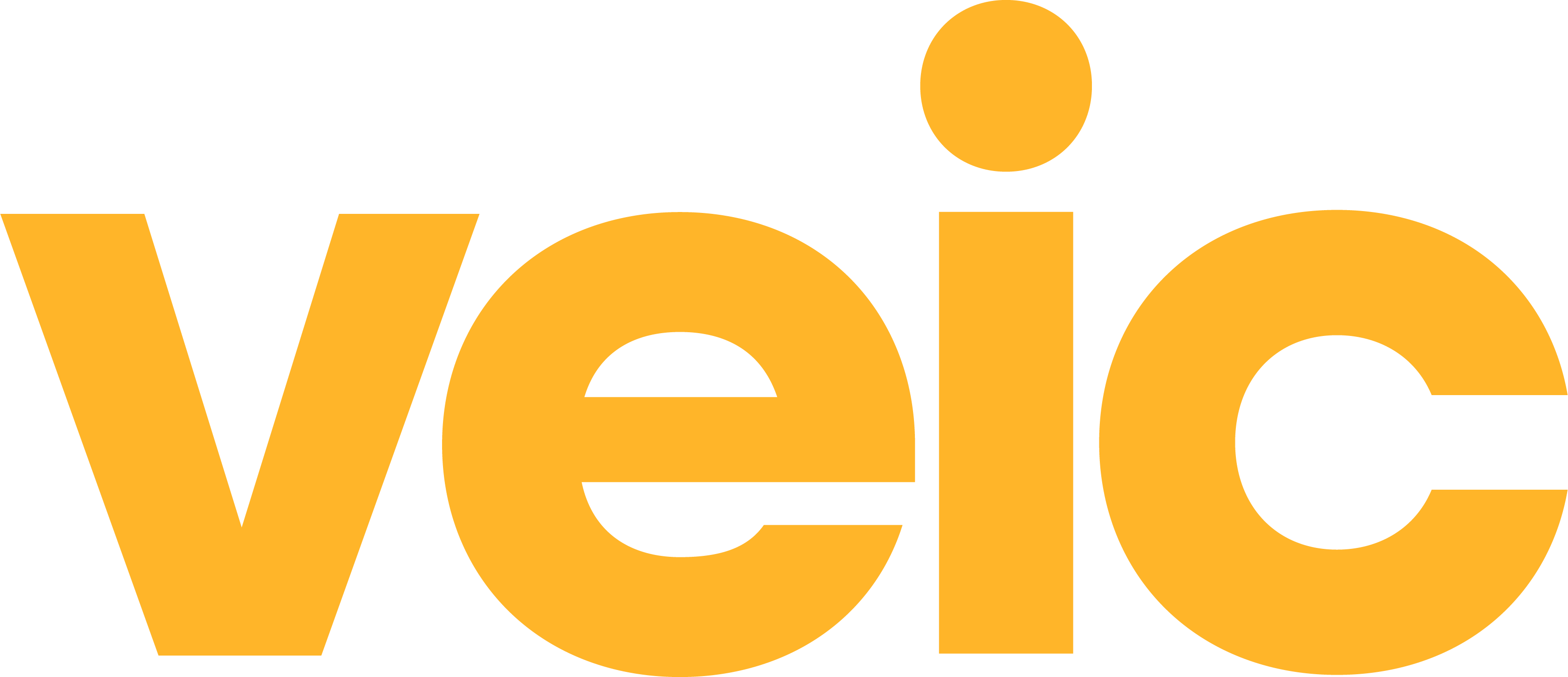
- Company type: Non-Profit
- Industry: Efficient energy use
- Founded: 1986 (Chittenden County, Vermont)
- Founders: Beth Sachs; Blair Hamilton
- Headquarters: Chittenden County, Vermont
- Area served: United States
- Key people: Rebecca Foster (CEO)
- Number of employees: approximately 300
- Website: www.veic.org

Vermont Energy Investment Corporation or VEIC is a non-profit organization in Chittenden County, Vermont that seeks to reduce the economic and environmental costs of energy consumption through energy efficiency and renewable energy adoption. Since its founding in 1986, the organization has been involved in designing energy efficiency and renewable energy programs in North America and worldwide.

VEIC also operates three large-scale energy efficiency programs in the United States, including Efficiency Vermont, the nation's first statewide energy efficiency utility.

== History ==
VEIC was founded in 1986 by Beth Sachs and Blair Hamilton with a goal to reduce energy costs for consumers by promoting energy efficiency and encouraging the conservation of natural resources. In particular, they focused their early efforts on helping reduce the burden of energy costs for low income consumers. By 1997, VEIC had implemented energy efficiency measures in nearly 100 low-income multifamily buildings throughout the state of Vermont; it also led a successful effort to establish an ordinance requiring landlords in the city of Burlington to meet a minimum efficiency standard before their buildings could be sold to new owners. Through a partnership with the Vermont Housing Finance Agency, VEIC also helped to establish financing programs and a home energy rating system to help low-income and first-time homebuyers avoid being burdened with high energy costs.

In 2000, VEIC won a competitive contract to operate Efficiency Vermont, the first statewide energy efficiency utility in the nation. Efficiency Vermont has been credited as an effective program:

- By the end of 2005, annual energy usage in Vermont had been reduced by 98,000 megawatt-hours
- In 2007 Vermont became the first state in the nation to turn electrical load growth negative
- Between 2009 and 2011, estimated energy savings produced by Efficiency Vermont were 304,000 megawatt-hours
- In 2011, efficiency accounted for a 1.91 percent reduction in Vermont's electricity supply requirements and 790,000 tons of avoided CO_{2} emissions

In 2007, VEIC established a 20-year goal to offset twice the amount of greenhouse gas emissions projected to be emitted in Vermont in the year 2027.

Over the course of 2010–2011, VEIC won competitive contracts to start up and begin operation of additional large-scale energy efficiency programs based in Ohio and Washington, D.C. Efficiency Smart, based in Columbus, Ohio, is a program of energy efficiency services offered to a network of public power companies that are members of American Municipal Power, Incorporated (AMP). VEIC operates Efficiency Smart under contract to AMP and has designed the program to save 70,000 megawatt-hours of electricity over the course of its first three years in operation. The District of Columbia Sustainable Energy Utility (DC SEU) is operated under contract to the District Department of the Environment in Washington, D.C. The DC SEU contract is held by the Sustainable Energy Partnership, with VEIC serving as the partnership lead.

In February 2012, VEIC, The Clark Group, and Vermont Law School were awarded a $34 million blanket purchase agreement to help the Environmental Protection Agency improve energy efficiency for commercial, institutional, and industrial customers throughout the U.S.

At a 2012 U.S. Senate forum on jobs, Scott Johnstone, the executive director of VEIC, reported that the organization continues to grow, despite the economic recession that began in 2008. According to his statement, from 2005 to 2012 VEIC increased its number of employees by 130%, and its revenues grew by 286%.

VEIC is also an active resource on transportation efficiency. It is facilitating the state of Vermont's participation in the Rocky Mountain Institute's “Project Get Ready” program, which is working to prepare for the electrification of the transportation system. It is also conducting research on least-cost transportation strategies, and best practices for applying energy efficiency principles to travel behavior and consumer purchase decisions in the transportation sector.

== Publications ==
- “VEIC and the Energy Efficiency Imperative” (2009) by Blair Hamilton
- “The Imperative: Wider and Deeper” (2007) by Blair Hamilton
- “What Does it Take to Turn Load Growth Negative?” (2008) by Scudder Parker, Michael Wickenden, and Blair Hamiltonzz
- “Fast Capacity Reduction through Geographically Targeted, Aggressive Efficiency Investment – Early Results from a Vermont Experiment” by Jim Massie, Nancy Wasserman, and Blair Hamilton
- “Those are Incentives, Not Rebates: Using DSM Funds to Leverage Investments in Low-Income Multifamily Housing” by Elizabeth Chant, Michael Sherman, and Jennifer Chiodo
- “Playing with the Big Boys: Energy Efficiency as a Resource in the ISO New England Forward Capacity Market” (2008) by Cheryl Jenkins, Blair Hamilton, and Chris Neme

== See also ==
- Energy Efficiency Implementation
- Efficient energy use
- American Council for an Energy-Efficient Economy
- Electric Vehicle
- Energy Star
- Plug-in Hybrid Electric Vehicle
- Rocky Mountain Institute
