= Millennium Power Plant =

- Official name: Millennium Power Plant
- Country: United States
- Location: Charlton, Massachusetts
- Coordinates: 42°06′40″N 72°00′04″W
- Status: Operational
- Commission date: 2001
- Owner: Talen Energy
- Operator: Millennium Power Partners LP

Power generation
- Units operational: 1
- Nameplate capacity: 360 MW
- Annual net output: 1964

External links
- Website: Official Website

The Millennium Power Plant is a 360 MW power plant located in Charlton, Massachusetts. It is a natural gas combined-cycle plant currently owned by Talen Energy and operated by Millennium Power Partners LP.

== Design ==
The plant currently consists of a single 360 MW combined-cycle turbine.

== History ==
The plant was originally owned by PG&E National Energy Group, a subsidiary of PG&E Corporation (whose leading subsidiary is Pacific Gas and Electric Company), who commissioned it in 2001. PG&E National Energy Group filed for Chapter 11 bankruptcy in 2003. After the bankruptcy, Mach Gen LLC was formed to own four of PG&E National Energy Group's power plants including the Millennium Power Plant. MACH is an acronym where each letter represents one of the four initial plants. The M represents the Millennium Power Plant.

In 2014, Mach Gen LLC filed for Chapter 11 bankruptcy leading to its 2015 sale of a portion of its natural gas portfolio including the Millennium Power Plant to Talen Energy.

== Environmental Concerns ==
As of 2012, the Millennium Power Plant was the fourth-largest emitter of greenhouse gases in Massachusetts and produced 924,993 metric tons of greenhouse gases in 2011.
