= Northfield Mountain (hydroelectricity facility) =

Hydroelectric plant in Massachusetts, U.S.

Coordinates: 42°36′39″N 72°28′17″W

Northfield Mountain is a pumped-storage hydroelectric plant and reservoir located on and under the similarly named Northfield Mountain in Erving and Northfield, Massachusetts. It is currently owned by FirstLight Power Resources (formerly NE Energy), which purchased the facility from Northeast Utilities in 2006.

== History ==
Engineering studies for the plant began in October 1964, with early site preparation starting three years later. In 1972 its 1,168 megawatt hydroelectric plant became operational as the largest such facility in the world. The facility was built to balance the supply from the nearby Vermont Yankee Nuclear Power Plant.

== Design ==
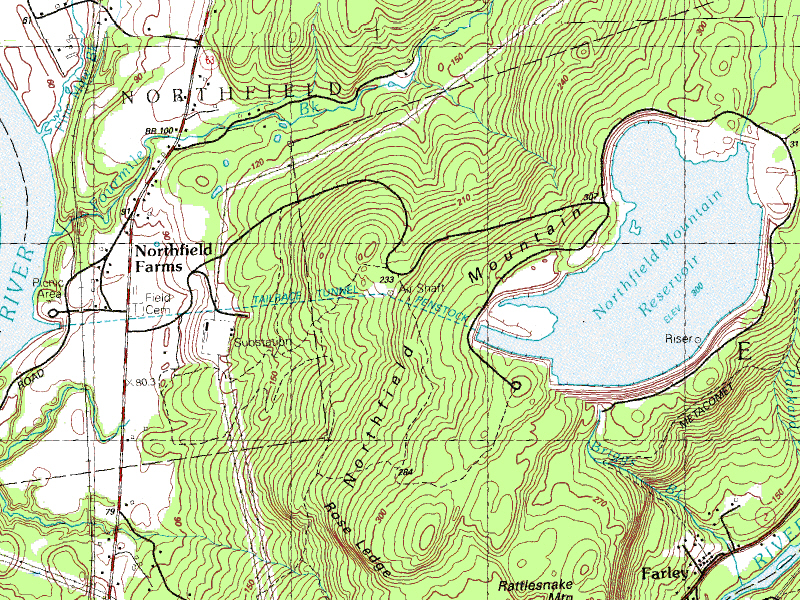
Northfield Mountain Tailrace Tunnel

The plant was built entirely underground, and located about 5.5 miles (8.9 km) up the Connecticut River from Turners Falls Dam. A stretch of the Connecticut River, extending some 20 miles (32 km) north from this dam to the Vernon Dam, Vermont, serves as the station's lower reservoir. During periods of lower electrical power demand, the plant pumps water from this lower reservoir through the Northfield Mountain Tailrace Tunnel to a man-made upper reservoir. At times of high demand, water is released to flow downhill from this upper reservoir through a turbine generator, where it then collects in the lower reservoir to be stored until again pumped to the upper reservoir.

Northfield Mountain's upper reservoir covers 300 acres (120 ha) at 800 feet (240 m) above the river, with total storage of 17,186 acre-feet (21.199 GL) of water. Its underground powerhouse lies at 700 feet (210 m) below the surface and is accessible through a 2,500-foot (760 m)-long tunnel; it includes four large reversible turbines, each of which can pump 15,200 cubic feet (430 m^{3}) of water per second and release 20,000 cubic feet (570 m^{3}) of water per second to generate 1,168 MW of electricity. The turbines can ramp up in 10 minutes, and deliver full power for 8 hours.

The plant also has a solar farm with a capacity of 2MW. It was added in 2011.

== Controversy ==
The plant was built to store excess energy from the Vermont Yankee Nuclear Power Plant, but that plant was shut down in 2014. The pumped-storage plant is still in operation, but according to activist site Connecticut River Defenders it is no longer needed, as it is only storing energy from fossil-fuel plants, and is harming the Connecticut River ecosystem, killing all river life that passes through its turbines. These claims, particularly about the plant exclusively storing fossil fuel power have had to be retracted.
