= Fore River Generating Station =

Coordinates: 42°14′32.00″N 70°57′55.93″W

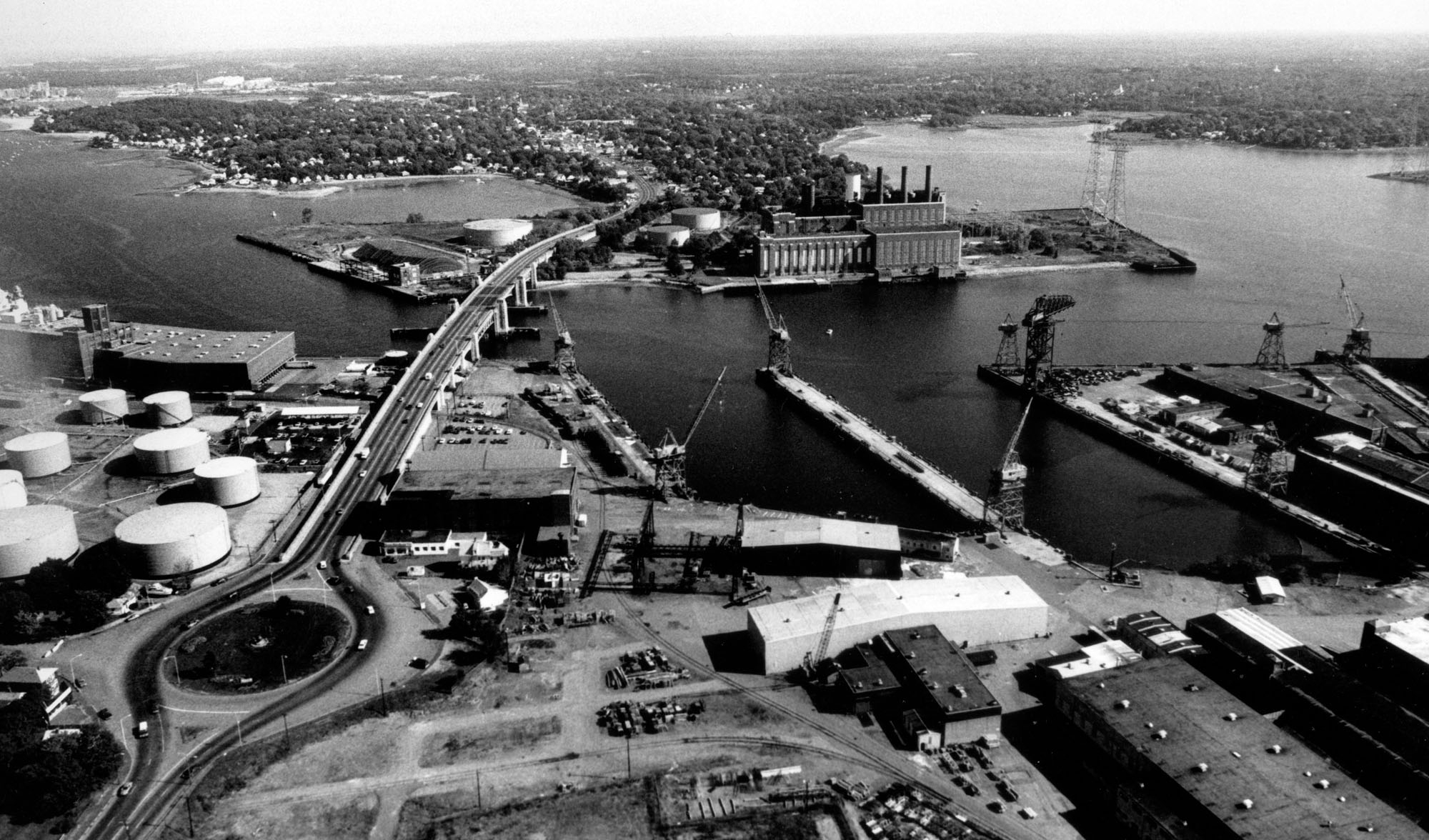
A 1987 image of the Fore River Shipyard with Charles L. Edgar Station in the background

The Fore River Generating Station is a power plant operated by Calpine Corporation since 2014 alongside Weymouth Fore River in Weymouth, Massachusetts. It operates two combustion turbines, two heat recovery steam generators and one steam turbine. The plant has a baseload capacity of 750 megawatts. The plant can run off either natural gas or ultra-low sulfur diesel fuel oil.

The current plant is on the site of the Edison Illuminating Company's Charles L. Edgar Station, built in 1923.
