= Pepperell Hydro Power Plant =

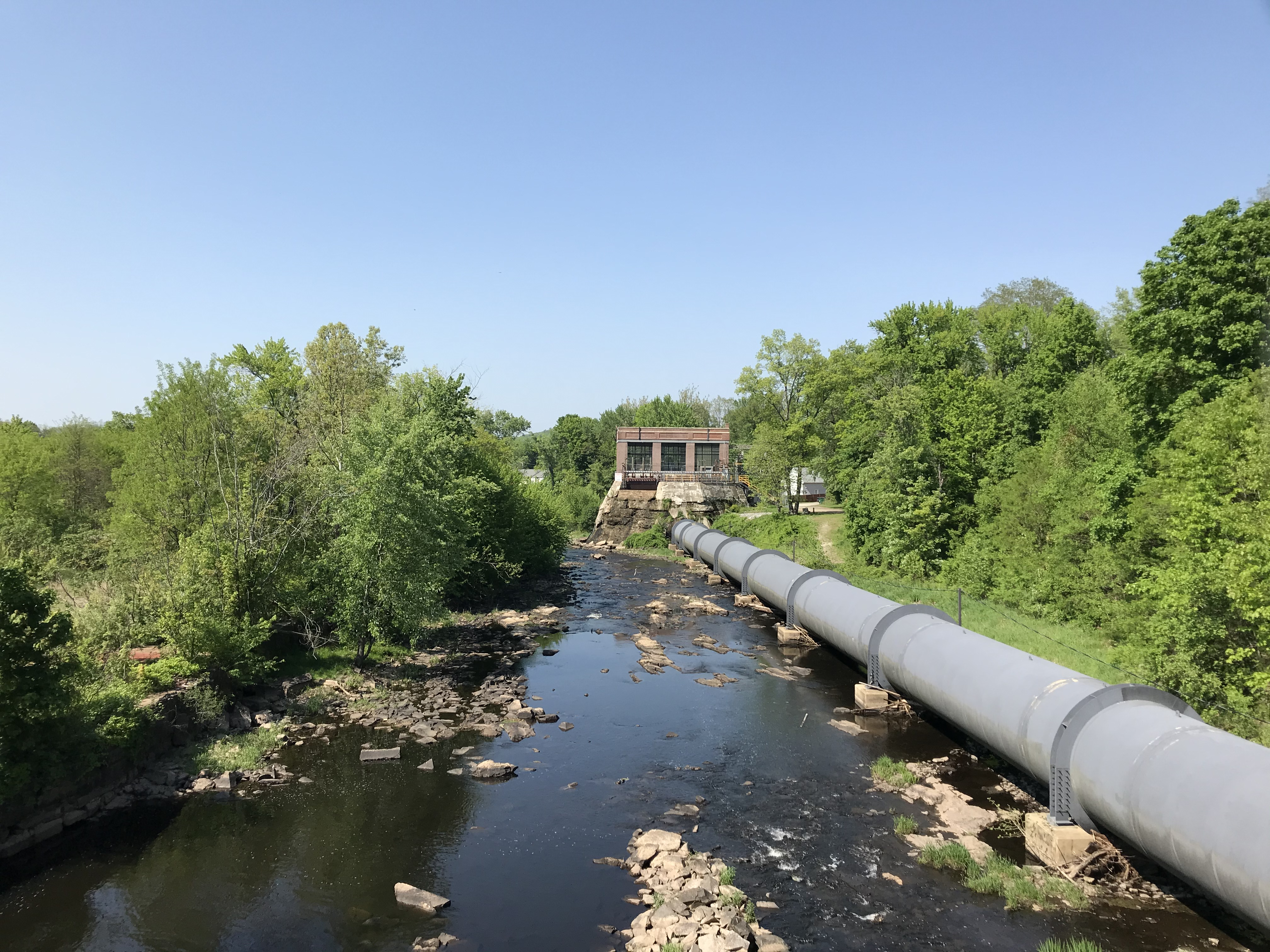
- Penstock and powerhouse

- Location of Pepperell Hydro Plant in Pepperell, Massachusetts
- Country: United States
- Location: Pepperell, Massachusetts
- Coordinates: 42°39′54″N 71°34′35″W
- Status: Operational
- Opening date: 1918
- Owner: Swift River Hydro Operations Company

Dam and spillways
- Height: 28 ft (8.5 m)
- Dam volume: 1,035 cfs

Power Station
- Type: Dam
- Installed capacity: 2.207 MW
- Annual generation: 7,813 MWh

The Pepperell Hydro Power Plant is a hydroelectric power plant located in Pepperell, Massachusetts on the Nashua River. It also serves as a bridge for Massachusetts Route 113.

== History ==
The power plant was constructed in 1918 by the Pepperell Paper Company as a means to power their nearby paper mill. It was originally constructed with three vertical Francis turbines and a 600-foot-long (180 m) penstock, all of which have since been replaced. After the paper company closed in 2002, the Swift River Hydro Operations Company was formed to manage and maintain the dam.
