= Efficiency Vermont =

American energy efficiency program

Efficiency Vermont is an energy efficiency utility that promotes and facilitates energy efficiency across the state of Vermont. Created in 1999 and implemented in 2000 at the behest of the Vermont Public Service Board, it has substantially reduced electrical demand and more than balanced load growth in recent years. Overall, the program has saved more than $3.3 billion for its customers, and has reduced Vermont's overall greenhouse gas emissions by an estimated 14.1 million metric tons. The program offers multiple rebates, programs, and services, including: energy assessments for homes and businesses, post-purchase and midstream (or "point of sale") rebates for appliances and heating systems, comprehensive weatherization, financing for home energy projects, project support, education and events, and income-based assistance. They also provide public access information to the most energy efficient products and technologies on the market. Efficiency Vermont is operated by the clean energy nonprofit Vermont Energy Investment Corporation. Their current director is Peter Walke.
