= Pittsfield Generating Facility =

- Country: United States
- Location: Pittsfield, Massachusetts
- Coordinates: 42.4564°N 73.2176°W
- Status: Operational
- Commission date: August 29, 1990
- Owner: Hull Street Energy

Thermal power station
- Primary fuel: Natural gas/fuel oil
- Turbine technology: Steam turbine

Power generation
- Units operational: 3 GE Frame 6B
- Nameplate capacity: 170 megawatts

Pittsfield Generating Facility is a natural gas or oil-fired station in Pittsfield, Massachusetts, built and operated by Altresco Pittsfield through 1993 (a subsidiary of Altresco Financial) when sold to J Makowski on behalf of PG&E.

The plant is under a Reliability Must Run Agreement with ISO New England that requires the plant to be available to run at any time when needed by the regional grid operator.

== Description ==
The plant consists of 3 GE Frame 6B 40 MW gas turbines running off of natural gas but capable of using fuel oil that feed a common 60 MW heat recovery steam generator.
