= Energy efficiency implementation =

The energy efficiency implementation industry pertains to the firms which retrofit or replace inefficient equipment with the goal of reducing energy consumption and GHG emissions. Retrofitting can enhance existing equipment by increasing operational energy efficiency at a lower cost. As a comparison, complete replacement of equipment may be more costly, but can reduce the implementation complexity. The overarching goal of energy efficiency implementation is to save kilowatt hours (kWh is a measurement of energy actually consumed).

== Public policy ==
Energy sector regulators can have wide discretion in the implementation and/or monitoring energy efficiency (EE) initiatives. The most likely roles involve giving technical advice to the agency developing EE initiatives, since changes in demand patterns will have implications for the operations and investment plans of utilities. Particularly when the EE outlays are by the utility, the energy sector regulator needs to monitor outcomes to ensure that the resources are being used in ways that are consistent with overarching public policies. Furthermore, interactions of utility initiatives with other EE policies need to be taken into account when evaluating whether the scale and scope of existing utility-based demand-side management programs. Utilities are in a position to analyze bills and conduct on-premises energy audits to identify areas of saving. Regulators could require utilities to undertake costly audit programs. A high tech approach to improving operations and the customer interface involves smart meters and information systems that enable the utility to track system performance in real time.

The costs of implementing such systems need to be balanced against the benefits, including the possibility that outlays on other projects might be more cost-effective. Thus, the role of regulators primarily involves providing technical input into the development of EE policies initiated by other agencies or via legislated tax programs. In addition, the regulator must determine, unless specified in law, which benefit-cost test is appropriate for evaluating utility-based EE programs. The regulatory tests include the participant cost test (will participants benefit over the measure's life?), the program administrator cost test (will utility bills increase?), the ratepayer impact measure (will utility prices increase?), the total resource cost test (will the total costs of energy decrease?) and the societal cost test (is the utility, state, or nation better off, including environmental impacts?).

== Effects ==
Energy efficiency implementation can also play a role in increased revenue when environmentalist consumers choose a "greener" product over another that is not. Energy efficiency implementation may need to be tailored to one's environmental needs. For instance, Christiann Abeelen's research on the energy efficiency projects in the Netherlands showed "Our findings show that large differences exist in the realized savings between individual companies. There is however no significant difference in savings observed between companies that participate in the Emission Trading System (ETS) and companies that do not. Although it is impossible to disentangle the drivers behind the implementation of these projects, the amount of savings suggest that at least part of them was implemented because of different energy policy instruments."

== See also ==
- Jevons's paradox
- Efficient energy use
