= Fore River (Massachusetts) =

Tidal estuary in the U.S. state of Massachusetts

Coordinates: 42°14′12″N 70°57′36″W

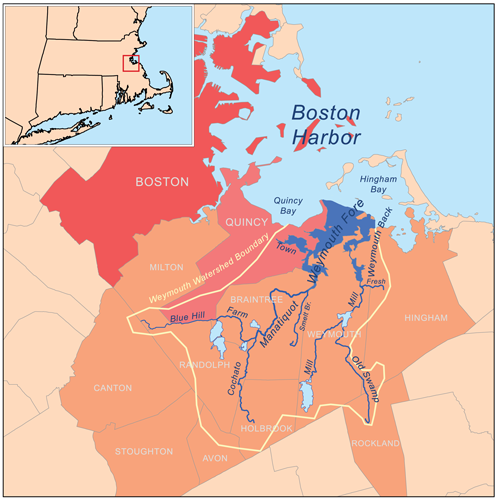
Map of the Weymouth watershed

Weymouth Fore River is a small bay or estuary in eastern Massachusetts and is part of the Massachusetts Bay watershed.

The headwater of Weymouth Fore River is formed by the confluence of the Monatiquot River and Smelt Brook in the Weymouth Landing area of Braintree. From Weymouth Landing, the tidal river marks the boundary between Braintree and Weymouth, flowing northeast for 0.5 miles (0.80 km) and then north for 0.5 miles (0.80 km) before widening considerably and turning west northwest for 0.7 miles (1.1 km). At this point the river's western shore is now in Quincy at the south end of the former Fore River Shipyard. Here the river turns north northeast for 1.0 mile (1.6 km) as it passes through a heavily industrialized area around the former shipyard and is crossed by the Fore River Bridge, a lift bridge which carries Massachusetts Route 3A between Quincy and Weymouth. A quarter mile beyond the bridge Weymouth Fore River is joined by Town River at Germantown, gradually widening to nearly 1 mile (1.6 km) as it travels the final 2.0 miles (3.2 km) northeast before ending as it enters Hingham Bay.

Recreation along Weymouth Fore River includes Smith Beach/Watson Park in East Braintree along the northwest shore near Weymouth Landing at the river's south end and Wessagussett Beach on the southeast shore in North Weymouth before the river enters Hingham Bay. The United States Naval Shipbuilding Museum located in Quincy Point at the west end of the Fore River Bridge features USS Salem, a preserved heavy cruiser which is open to the public.

The major commercial enterprises located in the heavily industrialized area around the former shipyard include:

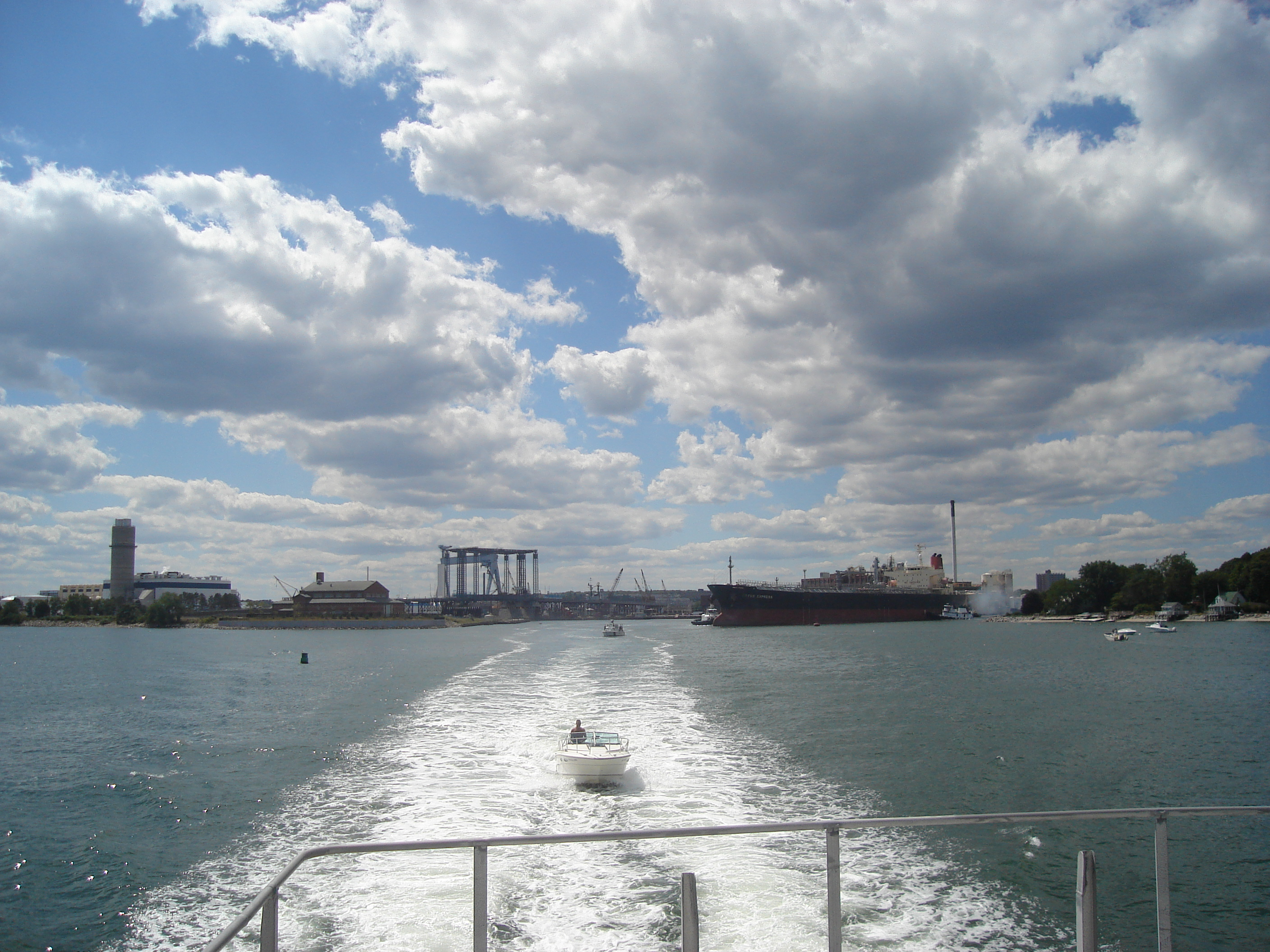
Weymouth Fore River

- Braintree
  - Citgo Petroleum Corporation, major oil and gasoline distribution terminal
- Quincy
  - Daniel J. Quirk, Inc., motor vehicle storage and distribution facility
  - Jay Cashman, Inc., heavy construction and marine equipment services
  - Massachusetts Water Resources Authority, sewage sludge heat-drying and pelletizing facility
  - Quincy Bay Terminal Company, short line freight rail service to CSXT South Braintree
  - Twin Rivers Technologies LP, oleochemical and biofuel production
- Weymouth
  - Calpine Fore River Generating Station, natural gas and oil electricity generation
