= Wind generation potential in the United States =

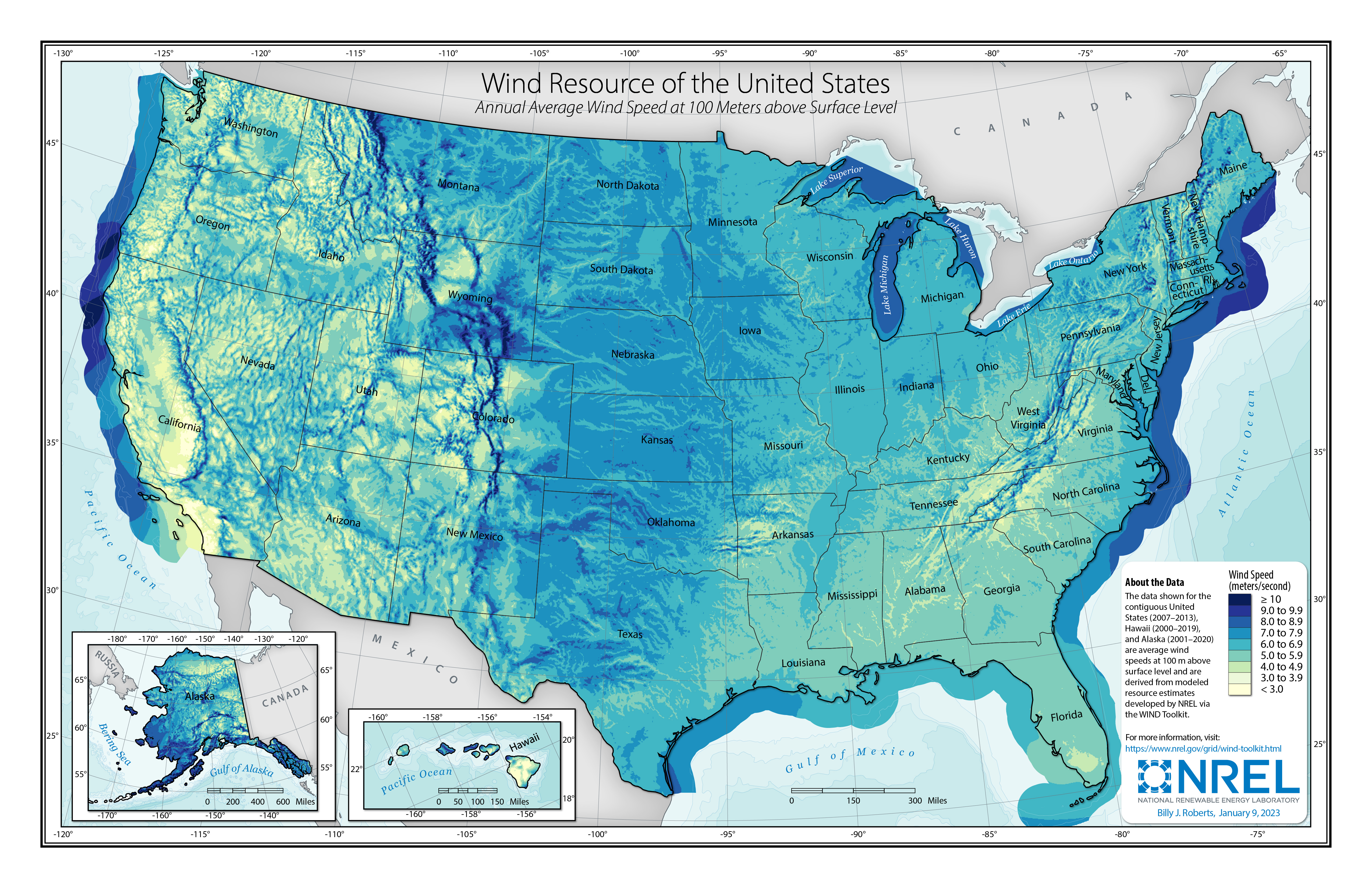
Average wind speeds at 100 meters

The wind generation potential in the United States far exceeds demand. North Dakota, the windiest state, has the capacity to install 200,000 MW at 50% capacity factor 100 m (330 ft)-high turbines. Texas, although not as windy, is larger, and has the capacity to install 250,000 MW at 50% capacity factor, and 1,757,355.6 MW of at least 35% capacity factor, capable of generating 6,696,500 GWh/year, more than all of the electricity generated in the United States in 2010.

There are only two states with no commercially significant wind power potential, Mississippi and Florida. Florida has the potential to install 900 MW at 25% capacity factor 100 m (330 ft)-high turbines, and Mississippi the potential to install 30,000 MW at 25% capacity factor 100 m (330 ft)-high turbines. For commercial operation, a capacity factor of at least 35% is preferred. There are no locations in either state that would achieve 30% capacity factor.

By the end of 2011, the United States had installed 46,919 MW of wind power, and generated 94,652 GWh of electricity from wind power in 2010.

The annual production of a wind turbine is a product of the capacity rating, the capacity factor, and the number of hours in a year. A 200 MW wind farm at 35% capacity factor will generate approximately 613.2 GWh/year.

In addition to the megawatt wind farms, community scale single wind turbines of from 250 kW to 750 kW are typically 50 meters high, and residential or farm wind turbines are typically 15–40 m (49–131 ft) high. To address these markets, maps are available showing wind potential at 30 m (98 ft) and 50 m (160 ft).

Wind Capacity Potential and Annual Generation
	50 Meter		80 Meter 30%		80 Meter 35%		80 Meter 40%		100 Meter 30%		100 Meter 35%		100 Meter 40%		Offshore potential	
State	Capacity (MW)	Generation (GWh)	Capacity (MW)	Generation (GWh)	Capacity (MW)	Generation (GWh)	Capacity (MW)	Generation (GWh)	Capacity (MW)	Generation (GWh)	Capacity (MW)	Generation (GWh)	Capacity (MW)	Generation (GWh)	Capacity (MW)	Generation (GWh)
Alabama	0	0	118.2	333	13.2	42	0.0	0	567.8	1,588	47.6	154	1.4	5	0	0
Alaska			494,702.9	1,620,792	291,121.3	1,051,210	144,960.9	580,479	641,898.0	2,135,249	410,922.8	1,489,752	216,576.4	861,262	N/A	N/A
Arizona	3,800	10,000	10,904.1	30,616	972.1	3,100	37.2	135	25,791.4	72,732	2,527.8	8,075	75.1	272	NA	NA
Arkansas	8,500	22,000	9,200.3	26,906	2,212.5	7,215	244.4	901	49,961.7	141,856	8,187.9	27,217	1,473.8	5,430	NA	NA
California	23,000	59,000	34,110.2	105,646	14,031.7	49,073	5,243.5	20,543	44,348.2	137,340	18,451.8	64,398	6,623.3	25,977	654,833	2,662,580
Colorado	190,000	481,000	387,219.5	1,288,490	266,910.6	945,484	134,078.1	507,885	429,455.6	1,489,820	327,461.1	1,198,210	208,807.2	810,145	NA	NA
Connecticut	2,000	5,000	26.5	73	1.0	3	0.2	1	186.2	519	9.1	29	0.6	2	7,171	26,545
Delaware	680	1,700	9.5	26	0.0	0	0.0	0	100.6	274	1.0	3	0.0	0	15,038	60,654
Florida	0	0	0.4	1	0.0	0	0.0	0	0.4	1	0.0	0	0.0	0	9,649	34,684
Georgia	590	1,500	130.1	380	30.6	101	6.0	22	293.6	863	77.7	259	16.1	59	58,629	220,807
Hawaii			3,264.9	12,363	2,483.3	10,179	1,956.4	8,474	3,564.1	13,694	2,761.7	11,434	2,105.9	9,320	736,945	2,836,735
Idaho	29,000	73,000	18,075.6	52,118	3,226.3	10,938	861.0	3,294	44,769.5	128,647	6,882.2	23,041	1,482.6	5,653	NA	NA
Illinois	24,000	61,000	249,882.1	763,529	120,620.7	391,737	4,501.2	15,942	329,617.6	1,072,740	233,463.3	799,298	78,691.0	286,858	15,872	66,070
Indiana	100	260	148,227.5	443,912	49,005.4	160,827	5,931.4	21,387	183,832.4	590,581	130,218.0	437,101	29,753.9	109,526	45	166
Iowa	220,000	551,000	570,714.2	2,026,340	482,414.9	1,772,460	318,595.1	1,232,860	601,956.7	2,325,420	566,965.2	2,224,020	466,297.4	1,890,360	NA	NA
Kansas	420,000	1,070,000	952,370.9	3,646,590	914,202.3	3,535,480	760,323.9	3,024,280	955,238.7	3,944,270	951,474.6	3,933,090	900,594.3	3,762,740	NA	NA
Kentucky	120	300	60.6	173	7.6	24	0.0	0	698.7	1,899	25.5	82	1.6	6	NA	NA
Louisiana	0	0	409.8	1,100	0.0	0	0.0	0	2,840.0	7,719	0.0	0	0.0	0	340,615	1,200,699
Maine	22,000	56,000	11,251.2	33,779	3,450.0	11,961	1,117.2	4,411	30,847.3	91,894	8,777.4	30,106	2,614.4	10,158	147,418	631,960
Maryland	1,200	3,000	1,482.9	4,269	188.6	607	12.0	43	2,713.0	7,975	855.3	2,753	46.1	167	51,909	200,852
Massachusetts	9,900	25,000	1,028.0	3,323	536.0	1,945	320.7	1,237	1,913.2	6,082	841.0	3,074	474.0	1,887	184,076	799,344
Michigan	26,000	65,000	59,042.3	169,221	11,661.6	37,619	394.0	1,420	179,056.0	523,374	39,311.6	129,467	6,571.3	23,774	422,577	1,739,801
Minnesota	260,000	657,000	489,270.6	1,679,480	388,907.2	1,392,590	175,181.0	681,616	603,426.7	2,170,610	483,459.1	1,832,230	369,908.6	1,457,950	29,215	100,455
Mississippi	0	0	0.0	0	0.0	0	0.0	0	0.0	0	0.0	0	0.0	0	3,213	10,172
Missouri	21,000	52,000	274,355.1	810,619	78,917.2	256,650	6,815.9	24,672	399,635.0	1,267,920	247,469.6	831,473	58,815.3	215,946	NA	NA
Montana	410,000	1,020,000	944,004.4	3,228,620	718,503.2	2,581,510	397,856.8	1,529,560	1,012,355.4	3,661,840	868,012.1	3,247,260	586,758.3	2,318,760	NA	NA
Nebraska	340,000	868,000	917,998.7	3,540,370	888,695.6	3,455,480	777,165.0	3,084,090	921,075.4	3,847,090	916,159.2	3,832,600	879,965.6	3,712,120	NA	NA
Nevada	20,000	50,000	7,247.1	20,823	1,290.4	4,263	219.6	810	12,033.9	34,478	1,916.9	6,328	319.1	1,179	NA	NA
New Hampshire	1,700	4,000	2,135.4	6,706	962.3	3,405	404.8	1,593	3,918.9	12,263	1,706.9	6,046	714.2	2,815	3,456	14,478
New Jersey	4,100	10,000	131.8	373	15.0	47	0.0	0	348.7	997	53.0	171	0.0	0	101,935	429,808
New Mexico	170,000	435,000	492,083.3	1,644,970	325,001.5	1,170,490	185,745.3	712,877	568,112.4	1,966,290	407,760.1	1,509,690	259,707.2	1,025,110	NA	NA
New York	24,000	62,000	25,781.3	74,695	4,805.3	15,826	667.1	2,560	57,638.6	172,787	20,418.0	67,619	3,205.3	11,982	146,077	614,280
North Carolina	2,900	7,000	807.7	2,395	196.3	695	86.0	337	1,500.1	4,461	347.6	1,220	131.0	518	306,020	1,269,627
North Dakota	480,000	1,210,000	770,195.8	2,983,750	760,034.4	2,954,260	692,821.1	2,728,620	771,791.2	3,230,900	769,479.2	3,224,180	756,497.2	3,180,710	NA	NA
Ohio	1,400	4,000	54,919.7	151,881	1,163.0	3,662	0.8	3	123,327.8	359,816	24,823.2	78,712	353.5	1,258	41,804	170,561
Oklahoma	290,000	725,000	516,822.1	1,788,910	400,674.3	1,457,740	247,773.2	952,678	614,804.3	2,236,000	505,258.6	1,923,820	379,335.0	1,509,670	NA	NA
Oregon	17,000	43,000	27,100.3	80,855	8,094.3	27,517	2,206.6	8,439	50,566.4	151,033	15,588.2	53,040	4,392.7	16,760	225,008	962,723
Pennsylvania	18,000	45,000	3,307.2	9,673	810.9	2,685	148.2	546	7,222.2	21,214	1,862.9	6,195	346.5	1,290	5,674	23,571
Rhode Island	380	1,000	46.6	153	27.6	99	14.2	55	83.8	267	40.8	148	22.0	87	20,965	89,115
South Carolina	200	500	185.0	504	3.2	11	0.8	3	1,215.3	3,362	18.8	60	2.0	7	133,217	542,218
South Dakota	400,000	1,030,000	882,412.4	3,411,690	852,371.8	3,325,230	766,382.5	3,039,460	890,626.1	3,690,490	875,058.5	3,645,620	833,893.1	3,508,870	NA	NA
Tennessee	640	2,000	309.3	900	64.5	220	16.8	66	816.5	2,355	142.8	479	28.9	113	NA	NA
Texas	470,000	1,190,000	1,901,529.7	6,527,850	1,360,185.5	4,989,570	826,982.8	3,240,930	2,320,792.9	8,299,400	1,757,355.6	6,696,500	1,226,632.6	4,953,700	271,443	1,101,063
Utah	9,600	24,000	13,103.7	37,104	1,517.1	4,939	138.8	511	26,237.3	74,704	3,389.9	10,988	274.8	1,007	NA	NA
Vermont	1,800	5,000	2,948.7	9,163	1,195.2	4,243	510.1	2,013	5,637.2	17,394	2,185.8	7,710	887.6	3,495	NA	NA
Virginia	4,800	12,000	1,793.3	5,395	614.5	2,070	156.1	592	3,465.7	10,336	1,110.8	3,747	245.4	931	89,073	361,054
Washington	13,000	33,000	18,478.5	55,550	6,298.1	21,289	1,588.2	6,052	32,606.1	98,132	11,282.7	38,403	3,149.4	11,969	120,964	488,025
West Virginia	2,000	5,000	1,883.2	5,820	820.2	2,822	280.3	1,066	2,772.0	8,627	1,270.0	4,394	465.2	1,771	NA	NA
Wisconsin	22,000	56,000	103,757.1	300,136	20,740.5	66,171	243.8	872	215,447.4	650,776	86,368.2	284,709	11,551.2	41,634	80,672	317,755
Wyoming	290,000	747,000	552,072.6	1,944,340	432,083.1	1,601,240	262,409.5	1,043,890	593,768.8	2,176,620	497,132.2	1,900,530	351,866.9	1,421,170	NA	NA
U.S. Total	4,200,000	10,777,000	10,956,912	38,552,706	8,417,082	31,334,728	5,724,399	22,487,228	12,770,877	46,864,699	10,208,933	39,595,435	7,651,675	31,204,421	4,223,514	16,975,802

The United States generated 4,125,060 GWh of electricity in 2010.

N/A = Not Available

NA = Not Applicable (no shoreline)

The United States has trailed other countries in the development of off-shore wind farms, and the first large-scale projects are under development in several states.

== See also ==
- Wind power in the United States
- Offshore wind power in the United States
