= List of power stations in Connecticut =

Sources of Connecticut utility-scale electricity generation in gigawatt-hours, full-year 2025:
1. Natural gas: 24,460 (56.2%)
2. Nuclear: 16,709 (38.4%)
3. Solar: 758 (1.74%)
4. Biomass: 591 (1.36%)
5. Hydroelectric: 342 (0.79%)
6. Petroleum: 244 (0.56%)
7. Other: 437 (1.00%)

This is a list of electricity-generating power stations in the U.S. state of Connecticut, sorted by type and name. In 2024, Connecticut had a total summer capacity of 10.0 GW through all of its power plants, and a net generation of 44,761 GWh. In 2025, the electrical energy generation mix was 56.2% natural gas, 38.4% nuclear, 1.7% solar, 1.4% biomass & refuse-derived fuels, 0.8% hydroelectric, 0.6% petroleum, and 1% other. Distributed small-scale solar, including customer-owned photovoltaic panels, delivered an additional net 1,747 GWh to the state's electricity grid in 2024. This compares as more than twice the amount generated by Connecticut's utility-scale solar facilities.

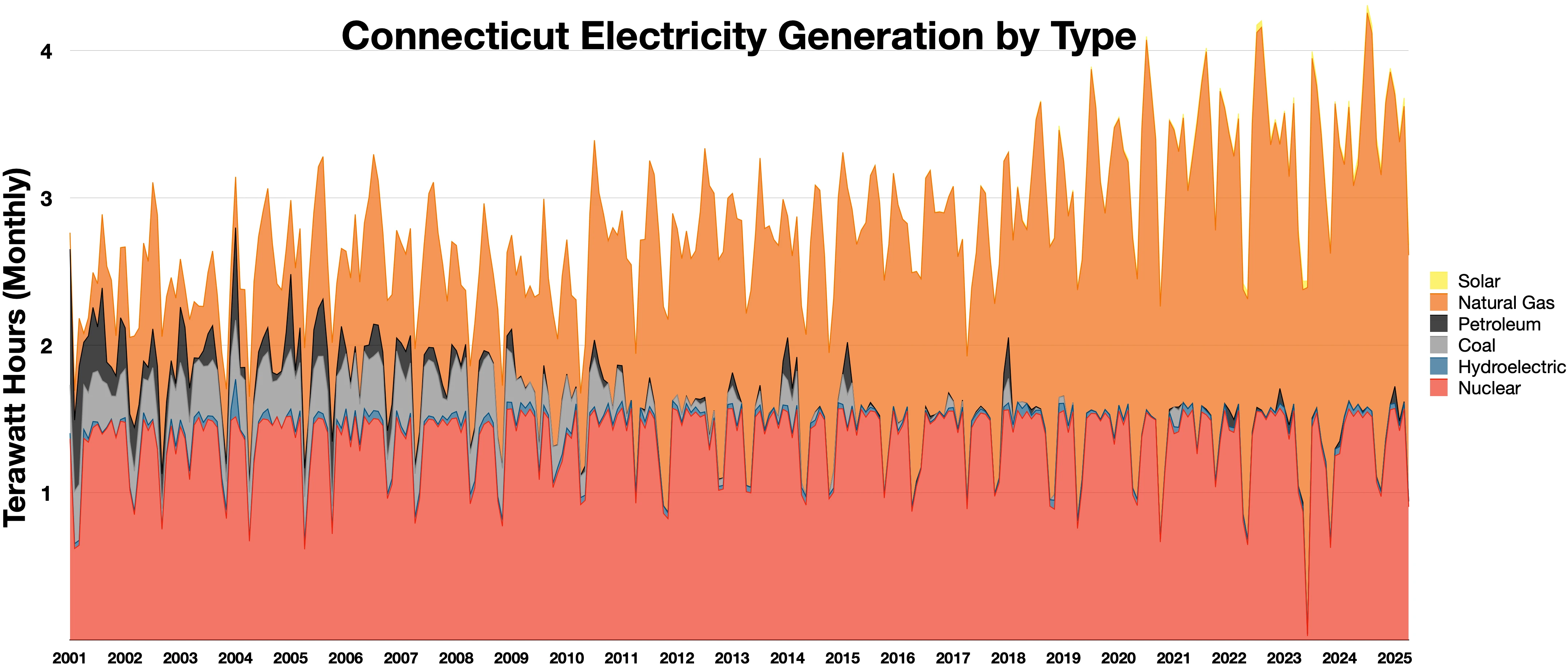
Connecticut electricity generation by type

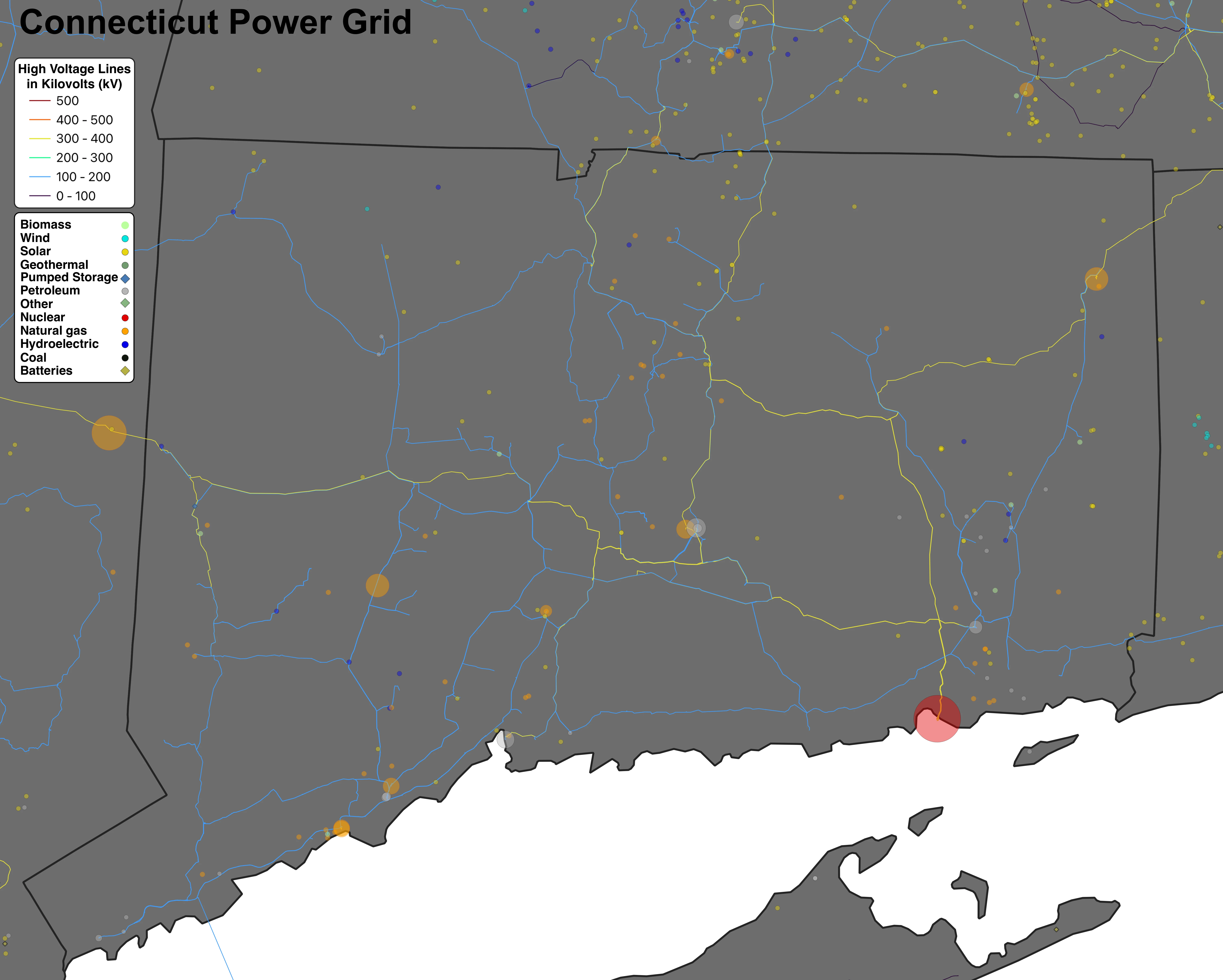
Connecticut power grid

== Nuclear power stations ==
Data reported by U.S. Energy Information Administration
Plant name	Location	Coordinates	Capacity (MW)	Technology	Year completed	Refs
Millstone Nuclear Power Plant	New London County		2,162.9	Nuclear		

Retired plants:

- Connecticut Yankee Nuclear Power Plant: 560 MW, operated 1968-1996

== Fossil-fuel power stations ==
=== Coal ===
The last coal-fired plant was retired in 2021.

=== Petroleum ===
Data reported by U.S. Energy Information Administration
Plant name	Location	Coordinates	Capacity (MW)	Technology	Year completed	Refs
Backus Microgrid Project	New London County		10.4	Petroleum liquids		
Branford	New Haven County		21.8	Petroleum liquids		
Bridge Street 1 & 2	New London County		5.2	Petroleum liquids		
Bridgeport Station	Fairfield County		17	Petroleum liquids^{[A]}		
CCSU Co-Gen-STBY Gen	Hartford County		1	Petroleum liquids^{[A]}		
Cos Cob^{[B]}	Fairfield County		115	Petroleum liquids		
Devon Station	New Haven County		222.6	Petroleum liquids		
Fort Hill 1, 2, 3 & 4	New London County		10.4	Petroleum liquids		
Franklin Drive	Litchfield County		21.8	Petroleum liquids		
Gary Court 1 & 2	New London County		6	Petroleum liquids		
Jewett City 1	New London County		2.6	Petroleum liquids		
Lebanon Pines 1 & 2	New London County		5.2	Petroleum liquids		
LNG 1 & 2	New London County		5.2	Petroleum liquids		
Middletown	Middlesex County		417.2	Petroleum liquids^{[A]}		
Montville Station	New London County		495.3	Petroleum liquids		
New Haven Harbor	New Haven County		128.7	Petroleum liquids^{[A]}		
Norden 1-3	Fairfield County		6	Petroleum liquids		
North Main Street	New London County		19	Petroleum liquids		
Norwich WWTP	New London County		2	Petroleum liquids		
South Meadow	Hartford County		167.2	Petroleum liquids		
Torrington Terminal	Litchfield County		21.8	Petroleum liquids		
Tunnel	New London County		16.5	Petroleum liquids^{[A]}		
Water Treatment 1 & 2	New London County		5.2	Petroleum liquids		
Waterside Power, LLC	Fairfield County		69.6	Petroleum liquids		

^{A} Multi-fuel plant, listed is "total net summer capacity" by source.
^{B} Not to be confused with the historic Cos Cob Power Station

=== Natural gas ===
Data reported by U.S. Energy Information Administration
Plant name	Location	Coordinates	Capacity (MW)	Technology	Year completed	Refs
A L Pierce	New Haven County		84	Natural gas fired combustion turbine		
Algonquin Windsor Locks	Hartford County		71	Natural gas fired combined cycle		
Bradley Energy Center	Hartford County		5.8	Natural gas internal combustion engine		
Bridgeport Energy Project	Fairfield County		520	Natural gas fired combined cycle		
Bridgeport Fuel Cell, LLC	Fairfield County		16.6	Other natural gas		
Bridgeport Station	Fairfield County		576.3	Natural gas fired combined cycle^{[A]}		
Capitol District Energy Center	Hartford County		70.5	Natural gas fired combined cycle		
CCSU Co-Gen-STBY Gen	Hartford County		2.6	Natural gas internal combustion engine^{[A]}		
CCSU Fuel Cell Project	Hartford County		1.4	Other natural gas		
Cellu Tissue	Hartford County		3	Natural gas internal combustion engine		
CJTS Energy Center	Middlesex County		0.4	Other natural gas		
CPV Towantic Energy Center	New Haven County		841.5	Natural gas fired combined cycle		
Danbury Hospital Cogen Plant	Fairfield County		4.3	Natural gas fired combustion turbine		
Digital Fairfield	Fairfield County		2	Other natural gas		
Fairfield University CHP Plant	Fairfield County		4.5	Natural gas fired combustion turbine		
Foxwoods CoGen	New London County		162	Natural gas fired combined cycle		
Frito Lay Incorporated	Windham County		4.6	Natural gas fired combustion turbine		
Hartford Hospital Cogeneration	Hartford County		11.8	Other natural gas, natural gas fired combined cycle		
HSCo CHP	Hartford County		4	Natural gas fired combustion turbine		
IBM Southbury	New Haven County		1.1	Other natural gas		
IKEA New Haven Rooftop PV & Fuel Cell	New Haven County		0.3	Other natural gas^{[A]}		
Lake Road Generating Plant	Windham County		840	Natural gas fired combined cycle		
Kimberly Clark-Unit 1,2,3	Litchfield County		36.3	Natural gas fired combined cycle, natural gas fired combustion turbine		
Kleen Energy Systems, LLC	Middlesex County		693	Natural gas fired combined cycle		
Middletown	Middlesex County		417.2	Natural gas steam turbine^{[A]}		
Milford Power Project	New Haven County		578	Natural gas fired combined cycle		
New Haven Harbor	New Haven County		447.9	Natural gas steam turbine^{[A]}		
Pepperidge Farm Bloomfield	Hartford County		2.6	Other natural gas		
Pfizer Groton Fuel Cell	New London County		5.6	Other natural gas		
Pfizer Groton Plant	New London County		37.5	Natural gas fired combustion turbine, natural gas steam turbine		
Pratt & Whitney	Hartford County		25.8	Natural gas fired combustion turbine		
Rand Whitney CHP Plant	New London County		14.6	Natural gas fired combustion turbine		
Sikorsky Aircraft CHP	Fairfield County		9.3	Natural gas fired combustion turbine^{[A]}		
South Windsor Fuel Cell	Hartford County		5	Other natural gas		
Trinity College Fuel Cell	Hartford County		1.4	Other natural gas		
TRS Fuel Cell	Fairfield County		3.7	Other natural gas		
UB Fuel Cell	Fairfield County		1.4	Other natural gas		
UCONN Cogen Facility	Tolland County		25.7	Natural gas fired combined cycle		
UI RCP Bridgeport Seaside	Fairfield County		2.5	Other natural gas^{[A]}		
UI RCP New Haven Fuel Cell	New Haven County		2.8	Other natural gas		
UI RCP Woodbridge FC	New Haven County		2.8	Other natural gas		
Waterbury Generation	New Haven County		96	Natural gas steam turbine		
Wesleyan University Cogen 1	Middlesex County		2.4	Natural gas internal combustion engine		

^{A} Multi-fuel plant, listed is "total net summer capacity" by source.

== Renewable power stations ==
=== Biomass and refuse-derived fuels ===
Data reported by U.S. Energy Information Administration
Plant name	Location	Coordinates	Capacity (MW)	Technology	Year completed	Notes	Refs
Covanta Bristol Energy	Hartford County		16.9	Municipal solid waste			
Covanta Southeastern Connecticut Company	New London County		18.3	Municipal solid waste			
CT Resource Rec Authority Facility	Hartford County		90	Municipal solid waste		Closed July 2022	
Exeter Energy LP	Windham County		31.3	Tire-derived fuel (TDF)			
New Milford Gas Recovery	Litchfield County		2.4	Landfill gas			
Plainfield Renewable Energy LLC	Windham County		43	Wood/wood waste biomass			
Win Waste Innovations Bridgeport	Fairfield County		67	Municipal solid waste			
Win Waste Innovations Lisbon	New London County		14.6	Municipal solid waste			

=== Geothermal ===
There were no utility-scale Geothermal facilities in the state of Connecticut in 2019.

=== Hydroelectric ===
Data reported by U.S. Energy Information Administration
Plant name	Location	Coordinates	Capacity (MW)	Year completed	Refs
Bulls Bridge	Litchfield County		7.2		
Falls Village	Litchfield County		9		
Goodwin Hydroelectric	Hartford County		3.2		
Kinneytown New Old	New Haven County		2.3		
McCallum Enterprises I LP	Fairfield County		8.6		
Quinebaug Lower Project	Windham County		2.5		
Rainbow (CT)	Hartford County		8		
Scotland Dam	Windham County		2		
Shepaug	New Haven County		37.2		
Stevenson	Fairfield County		30.5		
Taftville	New London County		1.6		
Tenth Street	New London County		1.4		
Tunnel	New Haven County		1.6^{[A]}		

^{A} Multi-fuel plant, listed is "total net summer capacity" by source.

=== Solar ===
Data reported by U.S. Energy Information Administration
Plant	Location	Area	Capacity (MW)	Refs
Adams Solar	New London County		1	
Advance Stores Company, Inc	Hartford County		1	
ALDI DC 2	Hartford County		1.2	
Amazon BLD3	New Haven County		1	
Antares-GRE 314 East Lyme LLC	New London County		4	
Barrett Farm Solar - Phase I	Windham County		1.7	
Becton Canaan	Litchfield County		2.5	
Brass Mill Center	New Haven County		3.4	
Canis Major Solar Farm	Hartford County		2	
Canis Minor Solar Farm	Litchfield County		1	
CMEEC - Bozrah	New London County		2.5	
CMEEC - Navy NE Trident	New London County		1	
CMEEC - Norwich Stott St Solar Hybrid	New London County		4.3	
CMEEC - Polaris Park Solar Hybrid	New London County		4.3	
Conn Mun Electric Energy Coop	New London County		2.5	
Corbin Russwin Phase 3 Berlin	Hartford County		1	
CP Middletown Solar I LLC	Middlesex County		1	
DWW Solar II	Hartford County		36.9	
Franklin Solar	New London County		1	
Fusion Solar Center LLC	New London County		20	
Hamilton Solar	New London County		1	
Hartford Landfill Solar EGF	Hartford County		1	
IKEA New Haven Rooftop PV & Fuel Cell^{[A]}	New Haven County		0.8	
Jackson Solar (CT)	New London County		1	
Jefferson Solar	New London County		1	
Manchester Community College East	Hartford County		1	
Manchester Community College North	Hartford County		1	
Plainfield Solar 2	Windham County		1	
Sherman Solar	New London County		1	
Sikorsky Aircraft CHP^{[A]}	Fairfield County		0.1	
Somers Solar Center, LLC	Tolland County		5	
Stafford MS Ground Mount Community Solar	Tolland County		2	
Ticket Network South Windsor	Hartford County		1	
Town of Branford	New Haven County		1.1	
Town of Rocky Hill PV CSG	Hartford County		3	
UI RCP Bridgeport Seaside^{[A]}	Fairfield County		2.2	
Wilson Solar	New London County		1	
Woods Hill Solar	Windham County		20	

^{A} Multi-fuel plant, listed is "total net summer capacity" by source.

=== Wind ===
Data reported by U.S. Energy Information Administration
Plant	Location	Area	Capacity (MW)	Refs
Wind Colebrook South	Litchfield County		5	

== Storage power stations ==
=== Battery storage ===
There were no utility-scale battery storage facilities in the state of Connecticut in 2019.

=== Pumped storage ===
Data reported by U.S. Energy Information Administration
Plant	Location	Area	Capacity (MW)	Refs
Rocky River	Litchfield County		31	

== See also ==
- List of power stations in the United States
- List of wind farms in the United States
