= Somers Solar Center =

Sonar power plant in Connecticut, United States

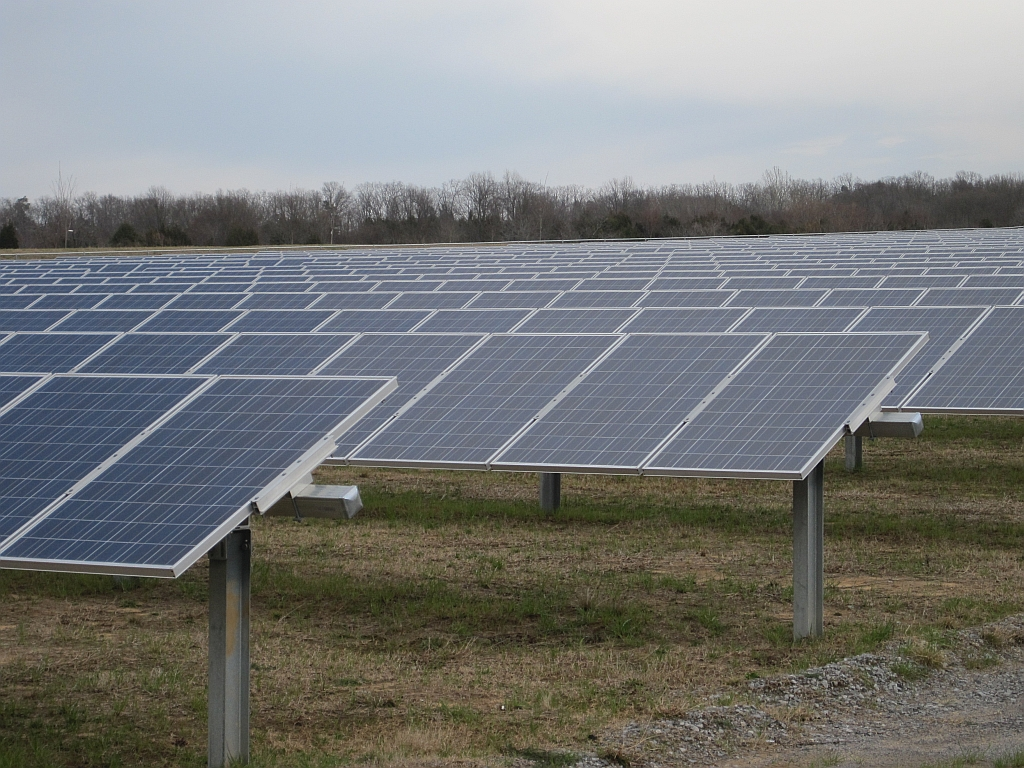
- Solar farm similar to Somers
- Country: United States
- Location: Somers, Connecticut
- Coordinates: 41°59′0″N 72°26′58″W
- Status: Operational
- Construction began: October, 2012
- Decommission date: November, 2013
- Owner: Dominion Resources

Solar farm
- Type: Photovoltaic
- Site area: 50 acres

Power generation
- Units operational: 23,150 Koycera
- Nameplate capacity: 5 MW
- Annual net output: 5,400 MWh

External links
- Website: Somers Solar Center

The Somers Solar Center is a five megawatt (MW) solar photovoltaic power plant in Somers, Connecticut. The project is owned by Dominion Energy, and Prime Solutions was the contractor and technology provider. The project was constructed on 50 acres (20 ha) of former pasture land. The project provides enough energy to power 5,000 homes annually.

== Project details ==
The origins of the center, which Dominion acquired from Kyocera in October 2013 are traced to an energy law enacted by the Connecticut legislature in 2011. Based on that law, the Connecticut Department of Energy and Environmental Protection issued a request for proposals in December 2011 for the development of ten megawatts of renewable energy to be sold under contract to the state's two major utilities. The Somers' proposal was one of two that were successful from among 21 entrants. Somers Solar Center is located on 50 leased acres in north-central Connecticut, roughly four miles south of the Massachusetts state line; it consists of 23,150 Kyocera solar panels that will generate roughly five megawatts (MW) of alternating current, enough electricity to supply about 5,000 homes annually. The project began construction in 2011. Prime Solutions Inc., a Connecticut-based company, was the center's engineering and construction contractor. The project provided about 80 jobs during the peak of construction, most of which came from locally owned companies. The electricity goes to the Connecticut Light & Power Co. under a 20-year power purchase agreement. The project was acquired by Dominion Energy in October 2013, one month before its completion. The project was completed in November 2013.

== See also ==
- Solar power in Connecticut
- Wind power in Connecticut
- Solar power in the United States
