= Bison Wind Energy Center =

Wind farm in North Dakota, USA

- Official name: Bison Wind Energy Center
- Country: United States
- Location: Morton County and Oliver County, North Dakota
- Coordinates: 46°58′48″N 101°33′17″W
- Status: Operational
- Construction began: June 2010
- Commission date: gradually thru Jan 2015
- Construction cost: $800 million
- Owner: Minnesota Power
- Operators: Minnesota Power, Siemens

Wind farm
- Type: Onshore

Power generation
- Units operational: 165 turbines
- Make and model: 16 Siemens SWT-2.3 MW; 85 Siemens SWT-3.0 MW; 64 Siemens SWT-3.2 MW
- Nameplate capacity: 496.6 MW
- Capacity factor: 37.4% (average 2016–2022)
- Annual net output: 1,628 GW·h

The Bison Wind Energy Center is a 496.6 megawatt (MW) wind farm spanning southwest Oliver County and north-central Morton County in the U.S. state of North Dakota. It became the largest wind generating facility in the state upon completion of the fourth construction phase in early 2015. The facility allowed the investor-owned utility company, Minnesota Power, to obtain more than 25% of its electricity generation from renewable sources, exceeding Minnesota's 2025 renewable portfolio standard requirement.

== Details ==
The project was developed by Minnesota Power, and its parent company Allete Inc., to harvest the highly productive wind resources in the adjacent state of North Dakota. The utility provides electricity to several energy-intensive industrial customers which dominate consumption within northern Minnesota's mostly rural economy. In 2009, the company prepared for the first construction phase with the purchase and upgrade of a 465 mile high-voltage direct current transmission line that would efficiently transport the electricity from the Square Butte Substation near Center, North Dakota to the Arrowhead Substation near Duluth, Minnesota. The company's plan also called for reducing its purchases of electricity from the coal-fired generating units feeding the Square Butte Substation as the Bison wind facility grew.

Construction of the first phase of 33 wind turbines began in June 2010. It included 16 Siemens SWT-2.3 MW and 17 Siemens SWT-3.0 MW turbines. The nacelle and hub components were transported by ship from Siemen's manufacturing facilities in Denmark to Allete's headquarters in Duluth, then trucked to the facility site about 40 miles west of Bismarck. The blades and the 80 meter tower sections were manufactured Fort Madison, Iowa and West Fargo, North Dakota, respectively. A new 22 mile 345 kV transmission connects the new Bison facility substation to the Square Butte Substation. Phase 1 began sending power to Minnesota by the end of 2010, and was fully commissioned in February 2012, with a total capital cost of about $177 million.

Construction phases 2 and 3 each consist of 35 Siemens SWT-3.0 MW turbines. Two phase 1 turbines were transferred to an initial phase 1B grouping which was ultimately included in phase 3. Phases 2 and 3 both came online at the end of 2012.

The latest and largest construction phase 4 began in the fall of 2013 and consists of 64 Siemens SWT-3.2 MW turbines. These more powerful turbines enable direct drive of the generator unit, thus reducing the number mechanical components and increasing reliability. The 92 meter tower sections were manufactured in Manitowoc, Wisconsin, a portion of the generator units in Hutchinson, Kansas, and the blades in Fort Madison, Iowa. A new 11 mile 345 kV transmission line and substation were constructed to connect the west side of the facility to an expansion of original Bison substation. The cost of this expansion phase was about $345 million, bringing the total investment in the facility to nearly $800 million. Phase 4 came online at the beginning of 2015.

In September 2015 Siemens announced that it had been contracted to provide operational and maintenance (O&M) support for the 3.0 MW and 3.2 MW turbines (total of 149 units) at the Bison Wind Energy Center for their first 10 years of operation. Minnesota Power is continuing to provide O&M support for the remaining 2.3 MW turbines (total of 16 units).

== Electricity production ==
Bison Wind Farm Generation (MW·h)
Year	Bison 1 81.8 MW	Bison 2 105 MW	Bison 3 105 MW	Bison 4 204.8 MW	Total Annual MW·h
2010	10,274*	–	–	–	10,274
2011	128,163*	–	–	–	128,163
2012	280,347	4,441*	–	–	284,788
2013	232,623	272,699	274,477	–	779,799
2014	269,839	324,088	326,727	–	920,654
2015	239,495	294,291	293,756	712,056*	1,539,598
2016	268,839	328,831	326,999	832,159	1,756,828
2017	271,815	328,922	333,816	840,920	1,775,473
2018	228,732	276,225	278,525	712,649	1,496,131
2019	244,356	284,922	290,829	750,939	1,571,046
2020	257,051	316,299	320,752	805,997	1,700,099
2021	216,375	299,770	300,931	715,972	1,533,048
2022	220,666	323,837	320,315	702,134	1,566,952
Average Annual Production (years 2016–2022) --->					1,628,511
Average Capacity Factor (years 2016–2022) --->					37.4%

(*) partial year of operation

== See also ==
- Wind power in North Dakota
- List of wind farms in the United States
