= New England Wind =

Proposed offshore wind farm off Massachusetts

New England Wind 1 & 2
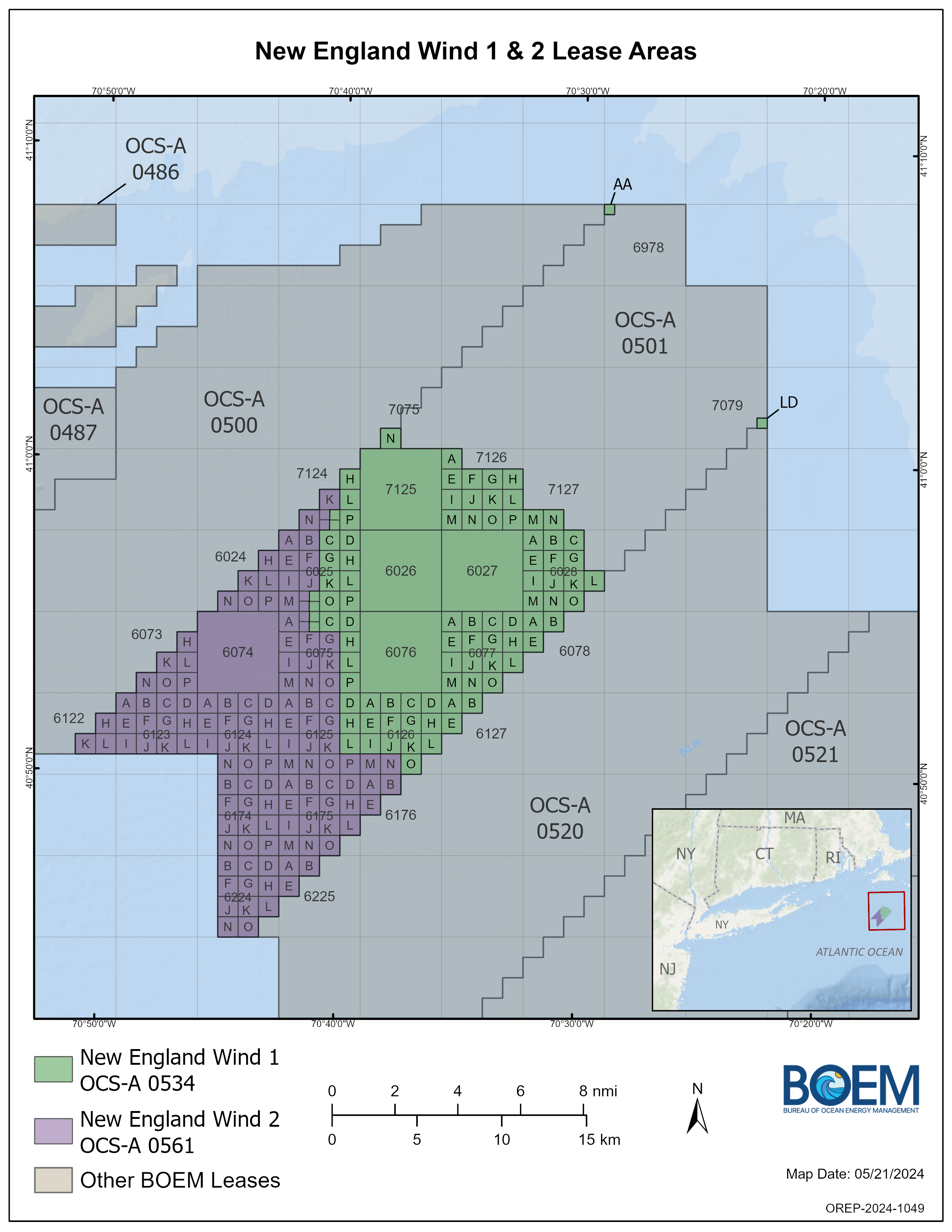
- New England Wind project Lease Area
- Country: United States
- Location: OCS-A 0534
- Coordinates: 40°51′40″N 70°42′40″W
- Status: Approved for construction
- Owner: Avangrid, Inc.

Wind farm
- Type: Offshore
- Distance from shore: 20 nmi (37 km) from Martha's Vineyard, Massachusetts; 24 nmi (44 km) from Nantucket, Massachusetts
- Rotor diameter: 285 m 935 ft

Power generation
- Nameplate capacity: 791 MW (New England Wind 1); 1,080 MW (New England Wind 2)

External links
- Website: New England Wind 1 New England Wind 2

New England Wind, formerly called Park City Wind and Commonwealth Wind, is a proposed offshore wind farm to be located about 23 miles (37 km) off the coast of Martha's Vineyard (MA) on Outer Continental Shelf in U.S. territorial waters of the East Coast of the United States. Avangrid is the developer.

The project takes its original name from the nickname of Bridgeport, Connecticut, where an offshore wind port is being developed to support the project at Bridgeport Harbor. Electric transmission cables from the project would make an underground landfall at Craigville Beach in Barnstable, Massachusetts.

As of 2022 a draft environmental impact statement (DEIS) and a construction and operations plan (COP) had been submitted to BOEM. It was projected to be commissioned in 2027.

In October 2023, Avangrid canceled its contract with Connecticut due to higher development costs. It intends to rebid the project for a higher price.

BOEM issued approval of the project's construction and operations plan in July 2024.

Avangrid has divided the project into two sections for bidding in the joint Connecticut–Rhode Island–Massachusetts offshore wind procurement, one with 791 MW (formerly Park City Wind) and one with 1,080 MW (formerly Commonwealth Wind). The project was awarded a contract with Massachusetts for 791 MW in September 2024. This section is expected to begin construction in 2025 with commercial operation by 2030.

| Wind farm | Offshore BOEM wind energy lease area | | | Receiving state | Capacity (MW) | Projected completion | Turbines | Developer/Utility | Regulatory agency |
|---|---|---|---|---|---|---|---|---|---|
| New England Wind | Offshore Massachusetts OCS-A 0501 | 23 miles off the coast of Martha's Vineyard (MA) | 40°51′40″N 70°42′40″W | | 1,871 | 2030 | Up to 129 | Avangrid; Copenhagen Infrastructure Partners | |

== See also ==
- Wind power in Connecticut
- Wind power in Massachusetts
- List of offshore wind farms in the United States

== See also ==
- Offshore Wind Power in the United States
- Offshore Wind Power
- Energy Policy Act of 2005
- Bureau of Ocean Energy Management
