= Solar power in Michigan =

Overview of solar power in the U.S. state of Michigan

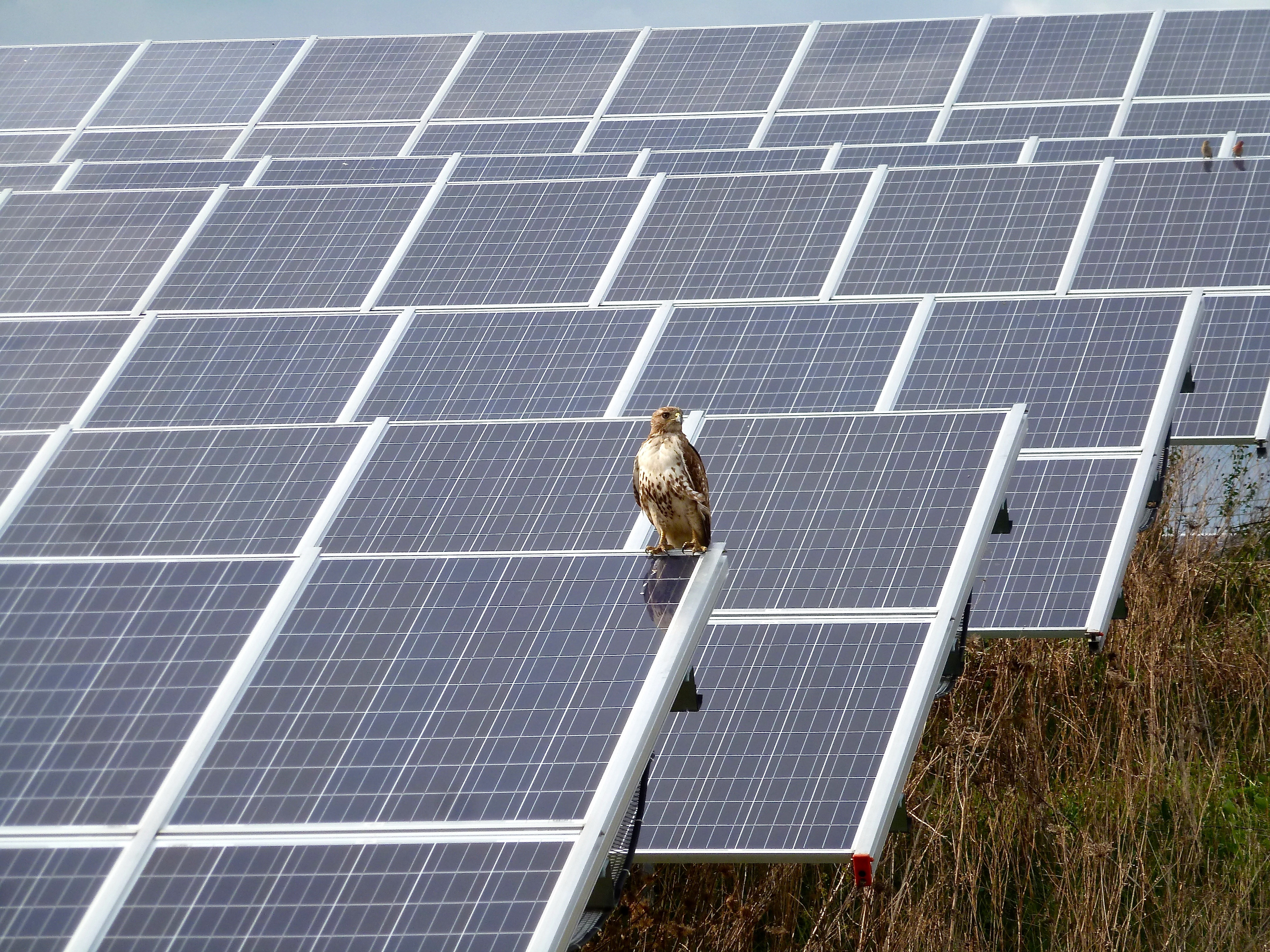
Red-tailed hawk at University of Michigan NCRC solar array

Solar power in Michigan has been growing in recent years due to new technological improvements, falling solar prices and a variety of regulatory actions and financial incentives. The largest solar farm in Michigan is Assembly Solar, completed in 2022, which has 347 MW of capacity. Small-scale solar provided 50% of Michigan solar electricity as recently as 2020, and multiple solar farms in the 100 MW to 200 MW range are proposed to be completed by the middle of the decade. Although among the lowest U.S. states for solar irradiance, Michigan mostly lies farther south than Germany where solar power is heavily deployed. Michigan is expected to use 120 TWh per year in 2030. To reach a 100% solar electrical grid would require 2.4% of Michigan's land area to host 108 GW of installed capacity.

Michigan had over 1,444 MW of solar capacity by the end of 2023. December 2020 marked a high point with over 105 MW brought online in that month alone. December 2021 saw 110 MW added. In 2016, solar provided only about 0.25% of all electricity. This rose to 1.3% in 2023.

== Solar farms and arrays ==
The 347MW Assembly Solar Project is the largest in the state. Located in Shiawassee County, it began construction in 2019 and was completed in March 2022. On January 5, 2026, Consumers Energy started operations of its largest solar array, Muskegon Solar, a 1900 acre solar farm @ the County wastewater plant in Moreland Township. The sprawling array can generate 250 MW of electricity, enough electricity to power 40,000 homes and businesses. In July 2012, Michigan's largest rooftop array, 977.6 kW, was installed in Canton on the IKEA store. Ford Motor Company and DTE Energy built the largest solar plant in the state, a 1.04 MW solar carport at Ford's world headquarters in Dearborn, Michigan in 2015. In 2015, DTE built a 1.1 MW solar farm at Domino's Farms near Ann Arbor, slightly larger than the Ford carport. The IKEA store announced an expansion of its existing array in 2015 to bring it to 1.2 MW. A 1.95 MW solar farm at DTE's Greenwood Energy Center near St. Clair came online in January 2016. Indiana Michigan Power, in November 2016, opened a 4.6 MW solar farm near Watervliet. In May 2017, DTE brought online a 28.4 MW solar farm and a 19.6 MW solar farm in Lapeer County. These are the first large utility-scale solar farms in the state, with the larger covering 200 acres of land and the smaller covering 100 acres. In July 2017, DTE completed a 2MW solar farm built in a closed city park in Detroit.

The 24 MW Delta solar farm opened in two phases in 2018, supplying power for the Lansing Board of Water and Light. Michigan State University built the largest solar carport project in North America, which covers 5000 parking spaces and has a total of 15 MW_{(DC)} of power, completed in December 2017.

A 1.3 MW solar farm was built by American Municipal Power at a brownfield site in Coldwater and came online in February 2018. Flushing Schools built a 0.96 MW system spread over the roofs of seven school buildings, completed in 2019.

In December 2020, the 20 MW Temperance Solar, 20 MW Bingham Solar, 15 MW Electric City Solar and the first 50 MW phase of Assembly Solar Farm were all brought online.

In January 2021, Pine Gate Renewables brought 16 MW of solar power online in the form of eight separate 2 MW solar farms in Genesee and Saginaw counties.

Fort Custer began construction in May 2015 of a 0.25 MW solar farm with plans for a second 0.3 MW farm later. This is part of the U.S. military's renewable energy goals of 25% renewables by 2025. In 2017, a project was announced for Fort Custer that would be a microgrid consisting of a 1.375 MW diesel system, 0.720 MW solar PV array, and a 0.400 MW energy storage system. Camp Grayling has a small 0.02 MW installation on one building roof while Selfridge Air National Guard Base had no solar power by 2014. Orion Renewable Energy Group, has proposed a 100 MW solar farm in SE Goodland Township in Lapeer County.

=== Solar with battery storage ===
"Circuit West" is a thirteen-block microgrid test in Grand Rapids. It contains a 0.65MW array of 1,800 panels on the roofs of three buildings and a 500 kW-hr battery.

=== Community solar ===
In 2015, several community solar projects were proposed. Consumers Power built a 3 MW solar farm at Grand Valley State University, completed April 2016, which became the largest solar farm in Michigan. Consumers Power also built a 1 MW community solar project at Western Michigan University, completed in August 2016. Spartan Solar, a 1.2 MW installation in Cadillac, was built by Wolverine Power Cooperative in fall 2016, the largest solar plant in Northern Michigan. A 0.3 MW community solar farm in East Lansing opened in January 2019 for Lansing Board of Water and Light. Escanaba approved a 1MW partly community solar installation near Delta County Airport to be online in 2018.

=== Proposed and under construction ===
Pittsfield Township has approved a 20 MW Community Solar Project on 77 acres owned by Ann Arbor.

A proposed 125 MW solar farm near Muskegon would also be among the largest in the state. Ranger Power's 149MW River Fork solar farm would be built in Sheridan Township, Calhoun County by mid-2021 and has an agreement with Consumers Energy. Ranger has also proposed a 200 MW farm in Montcalm County to be called Freshwater Solar. The 200 MW Calhoun Solar Energy Center is proposed in 2019 by Invenergy for Convis Township in Calhoun County which signed an agreement with Consumers Power in March 2021. In 2019, Ann Arbor proposed a 20 MW solar farm on a closed landfill site. In February 2020, Michigan State University's board approved a proposal to seek a 20 MW solar farm on 100 acres. Traverse City is investigating a 10MW solar farm at the Cherry City Airport and a 1MW farm on a waste dump; nearby Acme Township is working on the 9MW Trailside Solar Farm. A 150 MW solar farm to be built in Coldwater in Branch County was seeking planning approval in 2021. Copper Country Power has an agreement to build solar farms on two former mining sites in the Upper Peninsula: Groveland Mine in Dickinson County, and 7 Mile Pit in Crawford County. Superior Solar Project will be a 150 MW solar farm in Sands Township, Marquette County. White Tail Solar would be a 120 MW farm in Washtenaw County, A 100 MW solar project in Hart was expected to be online in 2023.

== Distributed solar ==
Distributed solar is not widely used in Michigan, with 14,446 installations. The total electric generation capacity of these installations was 124,749 kilowatts (kW) at the end of 2021. However, customer participation and installations are increasing quickly, with a 53% increase in capacity in 2019. On Jan 21, 2023 Consumers Power agreed to double the cap on its distributed rooftop solar and legacy net metering program from 2% to 4%. Additionally, the rate at which the company credits rooftop solar customers for the excess power fed onto the grid will be based on power supply rates that factor in transmission costs.

== Large-scale solar plans ==
Despite having only reached 100 megawatts of installation statewide by 2018, thousands of megawatts have been proposed or included in planning documents. In response to DTE Energy filing a proposal for 2023 which included a 1.1GW natural gas plant with almost no new solar installations, renewable energy advocates proposed a plan with 1,100 megawatts of new solar capacity, 1,100 megawatts of wind, and 253 megawatts of demand response, which they claimed would satisfy criteria at a lower cost. The state panel backed the DTE proposal in April 2018.

In 2017, Cypress Creek Renewables announced plans to build 2,600MW of solar plants in Michigan but has received no contracts from the two major power companies. Cypress Creek filed complaints in 2018 against DTE and Consumers Power for failing to comply with the PURPA law. In August 2019, Consumers Power proposed to allow 584 MW to connect to the grid by September 2023. This was almost four times the entire state total for solar power at the time of the proposal. They also propose accepting as much as 3000 MW to be connected to the grid at a lower purchase price per kilowatt hour over a longer timeframe. The proposal would need approval from the state electrical rate board. In September 2019, the Michigan Public Service Commission approved the settlement.

In June 2018, Consumers Power announced a plan detailing changes from now until 2040 that would see it close all coal plants, use only natural gas for 10% of current needs and have the majority of its power supplied by solar. This would require building 6,200MW of solar as well as using 450MW of battery storage. In 2020, Consumer Power expanded on this plan by announcing it would become carbon neutral.

In September 2019, DTE Energy announced it was seeking bids for 25 to 200 megawatts of electricity from solar projects to be online between 2021 and 2023.

== Solar industry ==
Michigan was ranked 14th among U.S. states for solar jobs in 2013.

In 2002, Stanford R. Ovshinsky built a factory in Auburn Hills, Michigan to build low cost Uni-Solar panels using amorphous semiconductors that generate power in diffuse light. Uni-Solar became the second largest manufacturer of thin film solar cells, after First Solar, and a developer of solar shingles before going bankrupt in 2012.

Suniva opened a solar panel factory in Saginaw in 2014, capable of producing 200MW of panels per year. Suniva closed its Michigan plant in March 2017 and later filed for bankruptcy.

== Government policy ==
The Government of Michigan has taken a variety of actions in order to encourage solar energy use within the state. On 28 November 2023, Governor Whitmer signed bills to transition Michigan to clean energy by 2040. The new laws also give the state the authority to override local decisions to allow farmers and property owners to house wind and solar projects on their land. State control over wind and solar projects will allow energy companies to avoid the bitter local zoning battles that have doomed such projects in the past.

On November 20, 2019, Governor Whitmer signed legislation exempting rooftop solar and alternative energy systems up to 150 kW from property tax assessment.

=== Net metering ===
The state had a net metering program that allowed installations of up to 20 kW of on-site electrical generation to continuously roll over any excess generation to the next month. Participation was limited to 0.75% of utilities peak demand the prior year. Peak demand for the state for 2011 was 21,477 MW.

In 2018, the net metering program was ended (with those already enrolled getting a 10-year grandfather term). The new inflow/outflow system will require new customers to pay full price for all electricity going in and receiving a credit based on avoided cost to the utility for electricity going out to the grid. Each utility will have to set this price in its rate case which must be approved by the Michigan Public Service Commission. Bills were introduced into the state house within weeks to alter this system as favoring large utilities over solar owners. Co-op electrical providers are not covered by the same rules but some moved to alter their rates after the state board's ruling.

=== Renewable portfolio standard ===
The state adopted a renewable portfolio standard (RPS) in 2008 which required that 10% of Michigan's electricity come from renewable resources by 2015. This standard was met mostly by wind power. A program to add 2 MW of distributed solar by Consumers Energy customers was reached in two weeks, and the state directed the company to offer another 2 MW at a cost not to exceed $20 million.

In December 2016, a new energy policy was adopted which called for 12.5% renewable power by 2019 and 15% by 2021. It further called for power suppliers to "obtain at least 35% of the State's electric needs through energy waste reduction and renewable energy by 2025."

Before the 2018 election, a referendum calling for "30% by 2030" was circulating. In response, DTE and Consumers Power promised at least 50% consisting of 25% actual renewables and 25% efficiency and demand reduction. The referendum's backers including Tom Steyer then stopped their campaign.

In September 2020, Gov. Whitmer signed an executive order for "statewide decarbonization by 2050." Bills were introduced in January 2020 to require that all of Michigan utilities' energy generation be renewable by 2050.

== Statistics ==
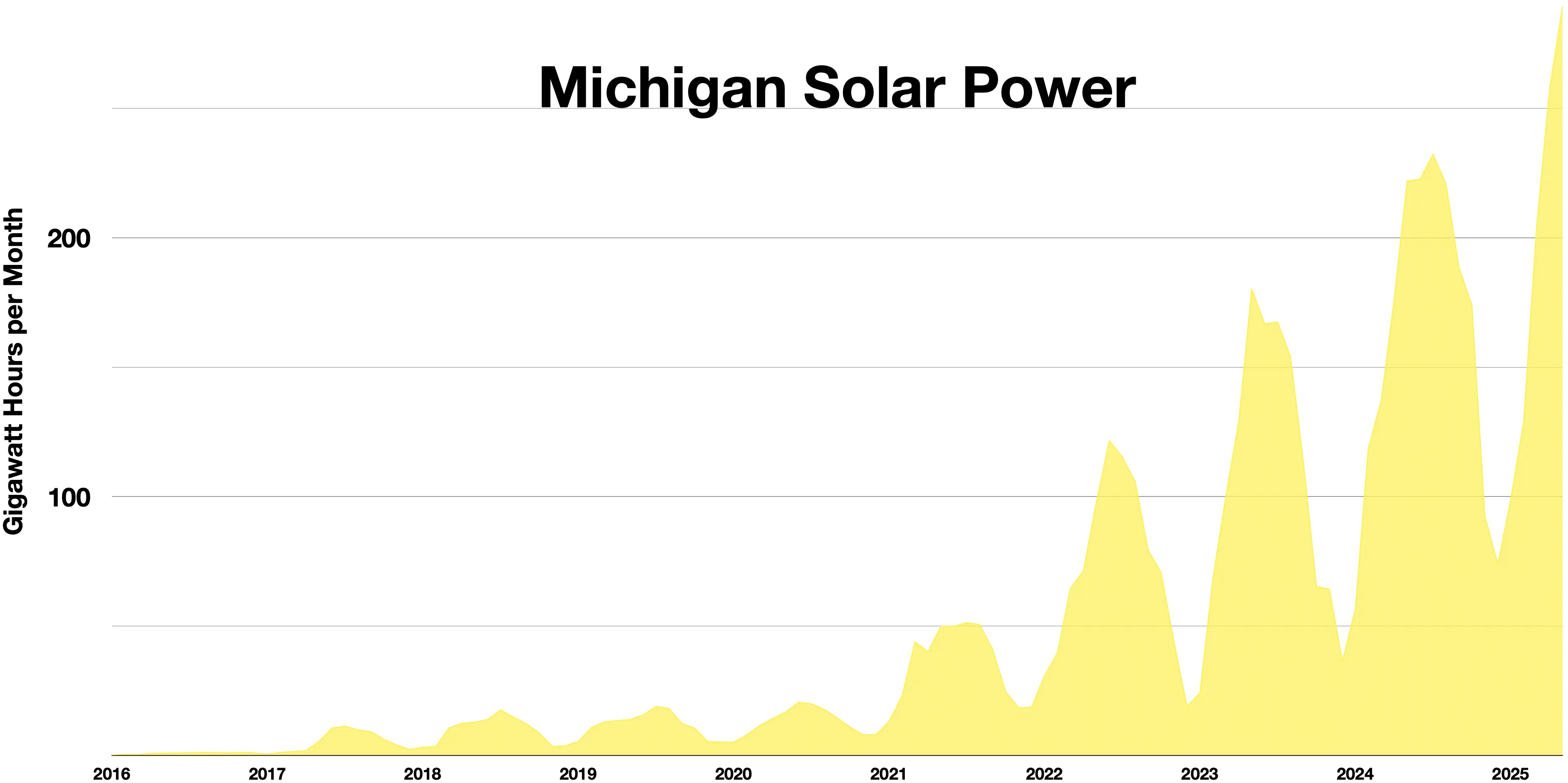
Michigan solar power

Michigan grid-connected PV capacity (MW)
Year	Capacity	Change	% change
2007	0.4		
2008	0.4	—	
2009	0.7	0.3	75%
2010	2.6	1.9	271%
2011	8.8	6.2	238%
2012	19.9	11.1	126%
2013	22.6	2.7	14%
2014	27.2	4.6	20%
2015	NA	NA	
2016	37.5		
2017	113.5	76	203%
2018	153	40	35%
2019	188	35	23%
2020	290.7	102.7	55%
2021	758.8	468.1	261%
2022	1,003	244.2	32%
2023	1,444	441	44%

Utility-scale solar generation in Michigan (GWh)
Year	Total	Jan	Feb	Mar	Apr	May	Jun	Jul	Aug	Sep	Oct	Nov	Dec
2016	9	0	0	0	1	1	1	1	1	1	1	1	1
2017	63	0	1	1	2	6	11	11	10	9	6	4	2
2018	119	3	4	11	13	13	14	18	15	12	9	3	4
2019	143	5	11	13	14	14	16	19	18	12	11	5	5
2020	155	5	8	11	14	17	21	20	18	14	11	8	8
2021	425	13	23	44	40	50	50	51	51	41	25	18	19
2022	861	31	40	65	71	98	122	115	106	79	71	44	19
2022	1313	40	71	101	131	169	160	161	150	115	85	76	54
2024	170	51	119										

== Largest farms ==
Solar farms in Michigan with over 5 MW of capacity
Name	Location	Size (MW)	Notes
Assembly Solar Farm	Shiwassee County	346.9	239 MW_{(AC)}, completed March 2022
Calhoun Solar	Calhoun County	260.0	200 MWac, 2023
Cereal City Solar	Battle Creek	100.0	
DeMille Solar Farm	Lapeer County	28.4	DTE
Delta Solar I and II	Eaton County	24.0	Lansing Board of Water & Light
Bingham Solar	Clinton County	20.0	
Blue Elk II Solar	Ingham County	20.0	
Blue Elk III Solar	Eaton Rapids	20.0	
Blue Elk IV Solar	Adrian	20.0	
Blue Elk VII Solar	Genesee	20.0	
Cement City Solar	Cement City	20.0	
Greenstone Solar	Coldwater	20.0	
Lyons Road Solar	Shiawassee County	26.8	20.0 MW _{(AC)}
MacBeth Solar	Muskegon County	26.8	20.0 MW _{(AC)}
Midcontinent Solar	Owosso	20.0	
Pullman Solar	Allegan County	20.0	
Shipsterns Solar	Calhoun County	20.0	
Temperance Solar	Monroe County	20.0	
Willford Solar	Gladwin County	20.0	
Turrill Solar Farm	Lapeer County	19.6	DTE
Electric City Solar	Sturgis	15.0	
Letts Creek Solar	Grass Lake	15.0	
Lightfoot Solar	Oscoda	10.0	June 2023
Spartan PV 1	East Lansing	10.5	Michigan State University carports
Pickford Solar	Pickford	6.9	Cloverland Electric Coop / Heritage Sustainable Energy
Byrne Solar Farm	Detroit	5.0	
Spring Creek Agri-Energy Center	Barry-Calhoun	140.0	

== Other smaller farms ==
This incomplete list includes some of the earliest and some more unique solar installations in Michigan.

Solar farms in Michigan with over 0.5 MW of capacity
Name	Location	Size (MW)	Notes
Watervliet	Watervliet	4.6	Indiana Michigan Power
Solar Garden 1	Grand Valley State University	3.0	Consumers Energy, community solar
13 Mile Solar	Calhoun County	2.0	Consumers Energy
O'Shea Solar Farm	Detroit	2.0	DTE Energy
Angola Solar Farm		2.0	
Bullhead Solar Project	Hillsdale County	2.0	Consumers Power
Captain Solar Farm	Genesee County	2.0	Consumers Power
Coldwater Solar Farm	Genesee County	2.0	Consumers Power
Interchange Solar Farm	Genesee County	2.0	Consumers Power
Geddes 1 Solar Farm	Saginaw County	2.0	Consumers Power
Geddes 2 Solar Farm	Saginaw County	2.0	Consumers Power
Hazel Solar Farm	Montcalm County	2.0	Consumers Power
Hendershot Solar Farm	Lenawee County	2.0	Consumers Power
Jack Francis Solar Farm	Genesee County	2.0	Consumers Power
May Shannon Solar Farm	Genesee County	2.0	Consumers Power
Stoneheart Solar Farm	Saginaw County	2.0	Consumers Power
M-72 West Solar	Traverse City	2.0	Traverse City Light & Power / Heritage Sustainable Energy
Greenwood Energy Center	Avoca	1.95	DTE Energy
Garden 2 Solar		1.4	DTE Energy
Lakeshore Die Cast Solar	Berrien County	1.4	Lakeshore Die Cast
Canton IKEA	Canton	1.22	
Coldwater Solar	Coldwater	1.20	American Municipal Power
Spartan Solar	Cadillac	1.20	Wolverine Power, community solar
Stateline Farms Solar	Morenci	1.2	1.0 MW_{AC}, Wolverine Power Cooperative
Gerken Paving Solar	Lenawee	1.2	1.0 MW_{AC}, Wolverine Power Cooperative
Harvest Solar Lenawee	Lenawee	1.2	1.0 MW_{AC}, Wolverine Power Cooperative
Domino's Farms	Ann Arbor	1.08	DTE Energy SolarCurrents
Ford World Headquarters	Dearborn	1.04	DTE Energy SolarCurrents
M-72 East Solar	Traverse City	1.0	Traverse City Light & Power / Heritage Sustainable Energy
Western Michigan University	Kalamazoo	1.0	Consumer Energy Solar Gardens program
GM Warren Transmission	Warren	0.9	DTE Energy SolarCurrents
Highland Cemetery	Ypsilanti	0.84	
McPhail	Wixom	0.82	DTE Energy SolarCurrents
Bissell Solar and Battery		0.8	with 0.3 MW battery, Consumers Power
Romulus Solar	Romulus	0.75	DTE Energy SolarCurrents
University of Michigan	Ann Arbor	0.67	DTE Energy SolarCurrents, 2 locations
Thumb Solar	Caro	0.66	DTE Energy SolarCurrents
Circuit West	Grand Rapids	0.65	Consumers Power, with 500 kW-hr battery
Heliotek	Holland	0.525	
GM Detroit-Hamtramck Assembly	Hamtramck	0.5	DTE Energy SolarCurrents
Ford Michigan Assembly	Wayne	0.5	DTE Energy SolarCurrents
Hartland Schools	Hartland	0.5	DTE Energy SolarCurrents
Liepprandt Orchard	Pigeon	0.5	DTE Energy SolarCurrents
Monroe County Community College	Monroe	0.5	DTE Energy SolarCurrents
Indian Springs Metropark	White Lake	0.5	DTE Energy SolarCurrents
Riopelle Farms	Harbor Beach	0.5	DTE Energy SolarCurrents
St. Clair RESA	Marysville	0.5	DTE Energy SolarCurrents
Sisters, Servants of the Immaculate Heart of Mary	Monroe	0.5	DTE Energy SolarCurrents
Brownstown Solar	Taylor	0.5	DTE Energy SolarCurrents
Wil Le Farms	Bad Axe	0.5	DTE Energy SolarCurrents

== See also ==
- Wind power in Michigan
- List of power stations in Michigan
- Solar power in the United States
- Renewable energy in the United States
