= Wind power in Michigan =

Electricity from wind in one U.S. state

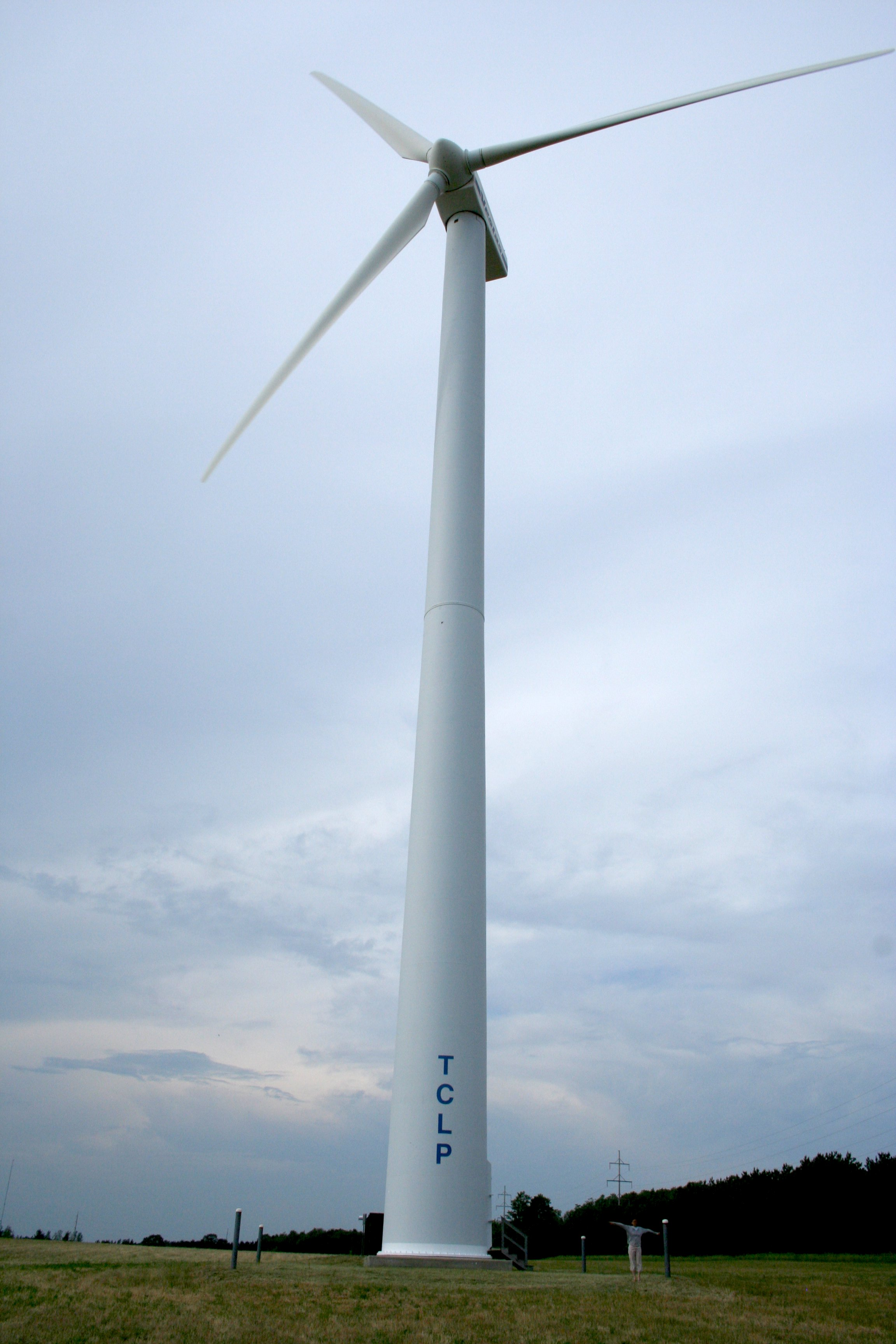
The first commercial wind turbine in Michigan, installed in Leelanau County near Traverse City in 1996, was retired and dismantled in 2022.

Wind power in Michigan is a developing industry. The industrial base from the automotive industry has led to a number of companies producing wind turbine parts in the state. The development of wind farms in the state, however, has lagged behind. In January 2021, there were a total of 1,481 wind turbines in the state with a nameplate capacity of 2,549 MW. The nameplate total exceeded 2,000 MW when Pine River came online in March 2019. Wind provided 4.2% of the state's electricity in 2016.

Michigan's requirement for 10 percent renewable energy by 2015 has led to increased alternative development in the state since this law was passed in 2008. A ballot initiative requiring 25% by 2025 failed in 2012.

The development of alternative energy sources has stimulated new businesses and employment. In 2011, the Environmental Law & Policy Center identified more than 100 businesses in Michigan involved in engineering and manufacturing wind turbine components, and employing 4,000 people.

Michigan wind generation capacity by year
Megawatts of Installed Generating Capacity

The first commercial wind turbine installed in the state, a 0.6 MW model, was erected in Traverse City in 1996. It remained the only turbine for several years. Traverse City Light & Power has announced a project to generate 30% of its power from renewable sources by 2020. In 2001, Mackinaw City installed two turbines rated at 0.6 MW each. (The turbines at Mackinaw City were removed in May 2024.) Laker Elementary School in the Thumb region installed three 65KW turbines and a 10KW one, totaling 0.2 MW in 2005.

The first wind farm in the state was the Harvest Wind Farm in the Thumb, opened in December 2007, with 32 turbines producing a rated 53 MW. Huron County has the highest number of wind turbines in the state.

In 2010, wind power produced 0.3% of Michigan's electrical power. Installed wind capacity more than doubled in 2011, to a total of 377 MW nameplate capacity.

The largest wind farm in Michigan, the 385 MW Isabella Wind Project developed by Apex Clean Energy and acquired by DTE, entered full operation in 2021.

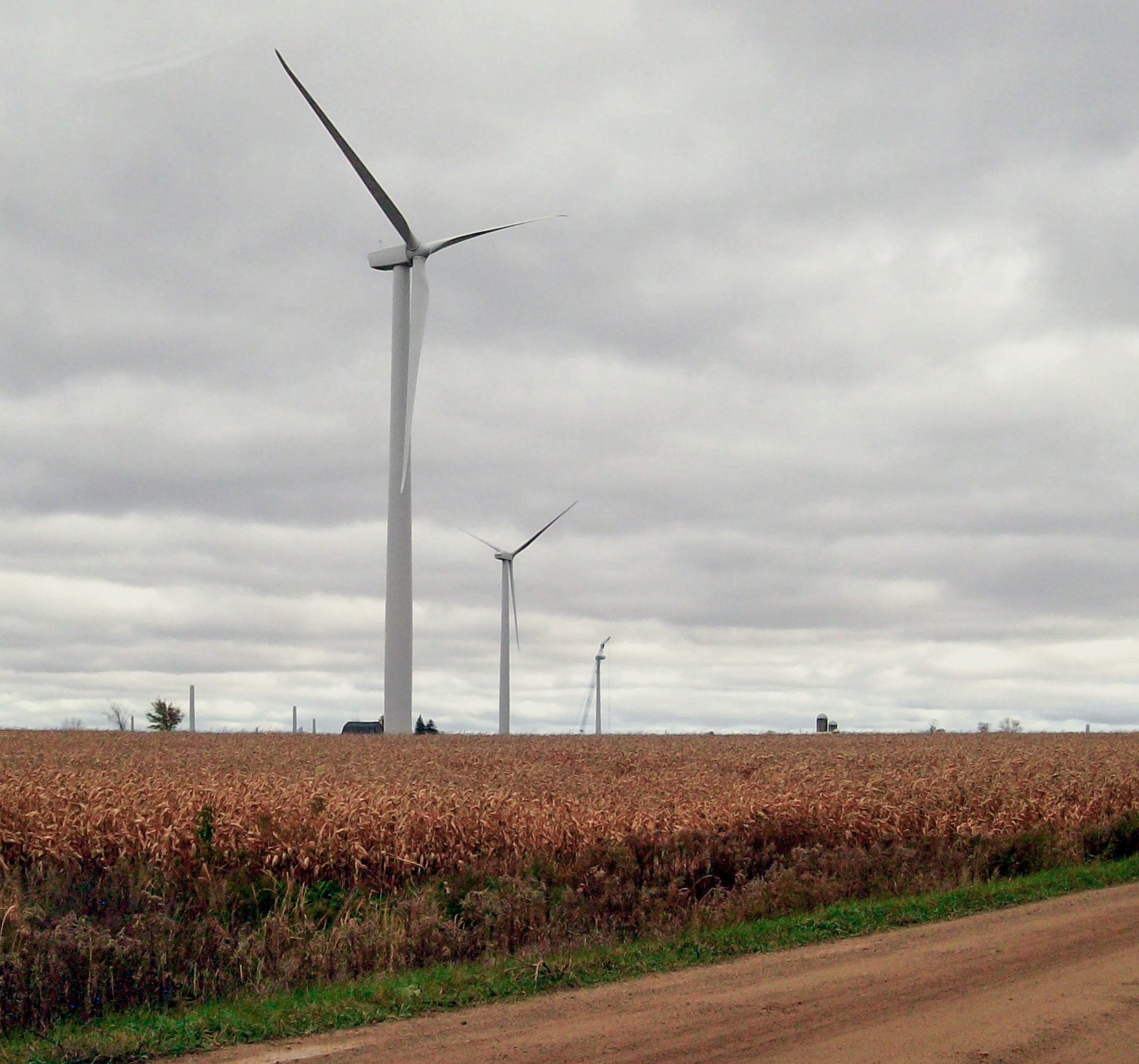
Michigan Wind 1, a 46-turbine wind farm near Ubly, with 69 MW capacity

A number of new projects are proposed in Michigan. In the Thumb region, which has most of Michigan's high-quality onshore wind, 140 miles of new 345 kilovolt lines are being built to allow the region to support hundreds of proposed new turbines.

Michigan has potential for offshore wind power in the Great Lakes, but development has been delayed by political considerations. A proposed wind farm in Lake Michigan at Ludington was rejected in 2010.

== Wind farms ==
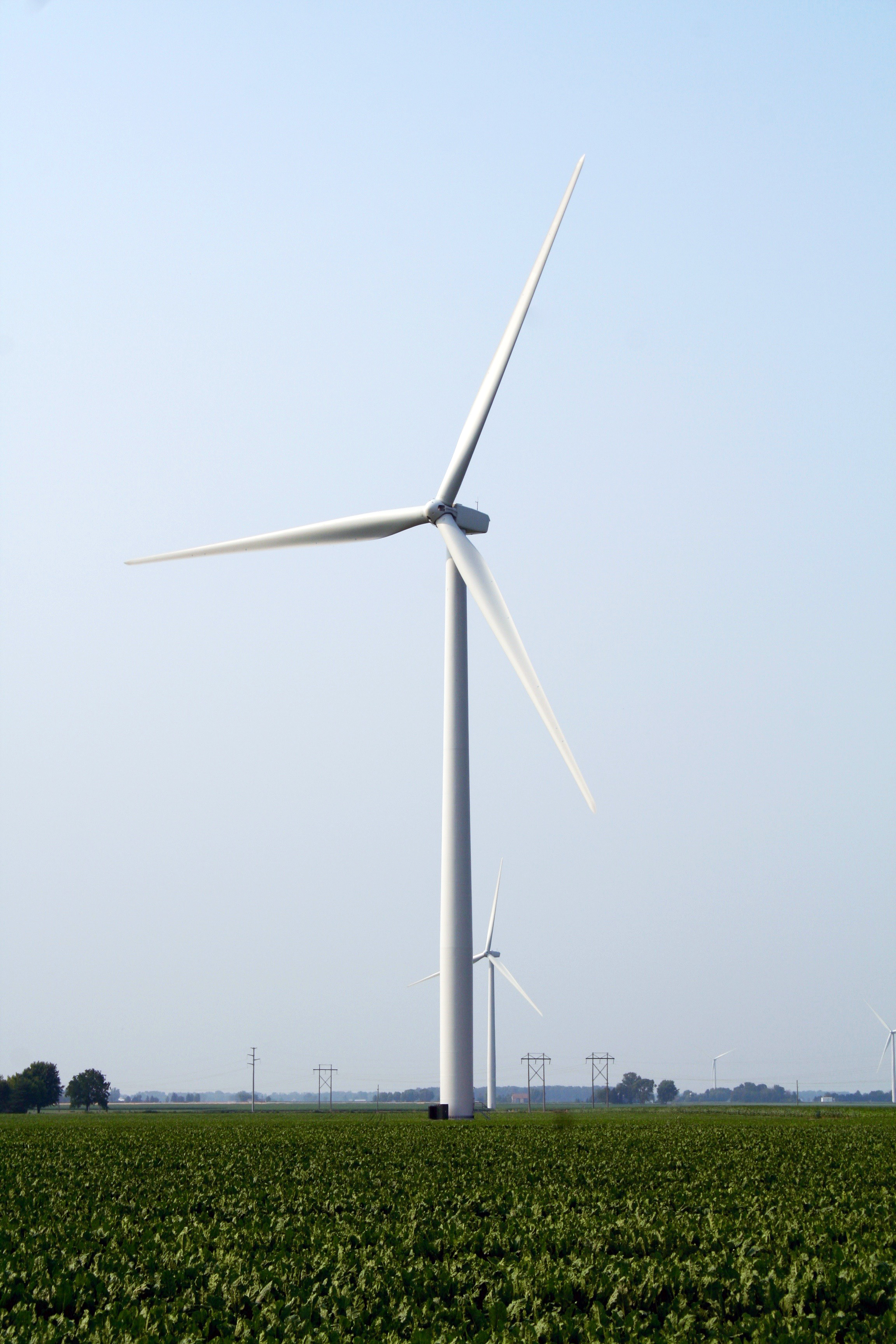
Wind turbines in Tuscola County, Michigan in July 2015

Name	Size (MW)	Location
Apple Blossom Wind Farm	100	Huron County
Beebe Wind Farm	81.6	Gratiot County
Beebe 1B Wind Farm	50.4	Gratiot County
Big Turtle Wind Farm	50	Huron County
Brookfield Wind Farm	75	Huron County
Crescent Wind	166	Hillsdale County
Cross Winds	111	Tuscola County
Cross Winds II	44	Tuscola County
Cross Winds III	76	Tuscola County
Deerfield Wind Farm	261	Huron County
Echo Wind Park	120	Huron County
Fairbanks Wind Farm	72	Delta County
Garden Wind Farm	28	Garden Township, Delta County
DTE/Invenergy Gratiot County Wind Project	213	Gratiot County
Gratiot Farms Wind	150	Gratiot County
Harvest Wind Farm I	53	Huron County
Harvest Wind Farm II	59	Huron County
Heartland Wind	200	Gratiot County
Isabella Wind	385	Isabella County
Lake Winds Energy Park	100.8	Mason County
McKinley	14	Huron County
Meridian	225	Saginaw and Midland counties
Michigan Wind 1	69	Ubly
Michigan Wind 2	90	Minden City
Minden	32	Sanilac
Pine River	161	Gratiot, Isabella counties
Pinnebog Wind Park	50	Huron County
Pheasant Run Wind I	75	Huron County
Pegasus	130	Tuscola
Polaris Wind Park	168	Gratiot County
Sigel	64	Huron County
Stoney Corners	60	McBain, Michigan
Tuscola Bay	120	Tuscola, Bay, Saginaw counties
Tuscola II	100	Tuscola, Bay counties

== Wind generation ==
Michigan wind generation by year
Wind generation (million kW-hours)

Michigan wind generation in 2015

Michigan wind generation (GWh, million kWh)
Year	Total	Jan	Feb	Mar	Apr	May	Jun	Jul	Aug	Sep	Oct	Nov	Dec
2008	142	10	6	10	12	13	8	8	5	6	12	16	36
2009	299	30	31	28	36	29	12	13	19	9	27	22	43
2010	359	38	24	33	37	27	16	15	19	32	33	39	46
2011	457	34	52	31	49	35	24	12	18	27	40	73	62
2012	1,130	107	88	99	88	66	68	38	52	64	121	110	229
2013	2,800	309	259	256	294	218	142	128	137	176	230	374	279
2014	3,867	420	354	380	386	291	221	210	156	231	355	457	406
2015	4,798	501	405	473	435	410	258	228	247	280	529	536	496
2016	4,694	524	487	403	330	315	302	273	202	327	392	498	641
2017	5,190	453	499	561	547	464	389	201	185	227	512	577	575
2018	5,456	763	535	589	468	411	297	243	263	295	536	510	546
2019	5,825	602	508	608	667	459	398	273	241	336	521	526	686
2020	6,734	608	681	587	512	505	375	273	324	534	641	908	786
2021	7,747	564	666	931	674	552	565	438	376	625	615	851	890
2022	9,110	881	922	919	845	742	592	509	438	515	838	991	918
2023	4,041	683	957	861	915	625							

Teal background indicates the largest wind generation month for the year.

Green background indicates the largest wind generation month to date.

Michigan used 102,489 GWh in 2016.

== See also ==
- Solar power in Michigan
- List of power stations in Michigan
- Wind power potential on the Great Lakes
- Renewable energy in the United States
- United States energy law
