= Wind power in North Dakota =

Electricity from wind in one U.S. state

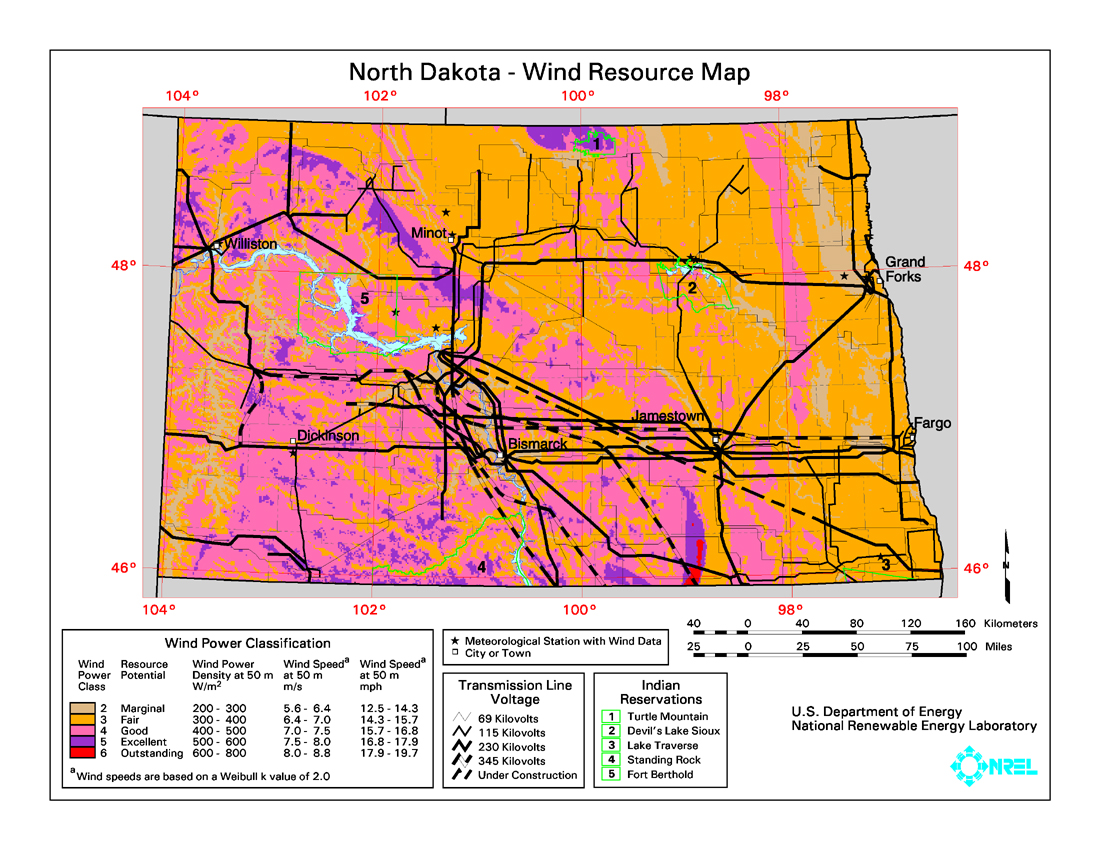
Wind resource map of North Dakota

North Dakota is a leading U.S. state in wind power generation. The state generated 26.8% of its electricity from wind during 2017, enough to power over one million homes.

2,996 megawatts (MW) of generation capacity had been installed for wind power in North Dakota at the end of 2017. Additional capacity had been limited by transmission line constraints until the completion of a transmission line from Fargo to central Minnesota in 2015. Capacity further reached 3,628 MW in 2019.

Very favorable wind conditions in the state enable wind farms to achieve capacity factors in excess of 40 percent. The 105 MW Thunder Spirit wind farm, completed in 2015, was expected to have a capacity factor greater than 45 percent.

== Wind farms in North Dakota ==
North Dakota led per-capita generation from wind in 2017

-->
Wind power projects in North Dakota
Operating
Under construction
Planned

North Dakota hosts a growing number of utility-scale wind farms in all regions of the state (view map at left). The largest is the 497 MW Bison Wind Energy Center, completed in 2015. The state had the highest per-capita wind generation in the nation in 2017 according to data from the U.S. Energy Information Administration (see figure at right).

== Statistics ==
North Dakota wind generating capacity by year
Megawatts of generating capacity

North Dakota wind generation by year
Million kilowatt-hours of electricity

North Dakota wind generation (GWh, million kWh)
Year	Total	Jan	Feb	Mar	Apr	May	Jun	Jul	Aug	Sep	Oct	Nov	Dec
2003	58	1	0	0	1	1	0	0	1	1	13	19	21
2004	215	17	20	22	18	20	13	12	14	17	22	20	20
2005	221	15	15	19	24	21	16	15	13	16	22	22	23
2006	370	28	32	32	32	36	27	24	23	26	34	31	45
2007	621	63	39	56	44	57	45	40	39	54	50	61	73
2008	1,693	58	49	64	97	144	119	109	159	173	227	201	293
2009	2,996	296	245	283	268	265	161	179	178	259	255	338	269
2010	4,096	323	203	303	359	427	280	257	341	421	400	400	382
2011	5,236	436	523	435	444	525	381	272	297	360	475	541	547
2012	5,275	579	390	541	561	481	399	271	310	399	558	410	376
2013	5,519	597	394	425	518	536	393	312	273	426	497	589	559
2014	6,203	743	619	554	575	499	421	374	282	462	635	664	375
2015	6,507	665	475	702	658	573	340	404	385	500	702	583	520
2016	8,173	561	549	723	811	635	640	506	522	676	731	800	1,019
2017	11,360	914	928	1,080	1,033	998	891	679	550	887	1,190	1,045	1,165
2018	10,732	1,125	1,034	919	1,050	764	763	638	638	902	1,032	847	1,020
2019	11,213	986	792	1,090	983	900	755	642	775	969	1,279	991	1,051
2020	13,635	1,046	1,186	1,199	1,184	1,119	1,074	850	874	1,213	1,228	1,369	1,293
2021	14,543	1,188	1,057	1,434	1,266	1,250	887	896	1,040	1,201	1,374	1,485	1,465
2022	16,568	1,610	1,517	1,684	1,710	1,444	1,130	936	974	1,195	1,368	1,619	1,381
2023	4,242	1,204	1,556	1,482									

== Seasonal generation ==
North Dakota wind generation is strong year-round, and tends to be strongest during the spring and fall.

North Dakota monthly wind generation in 2017

== See also ==
- Solar power in North Dakota
- Wind power in the United States
- List of wind farms in the United States
