= Solar power in Connecticut =

Overview of solar power in the U.S. state of Connecticut

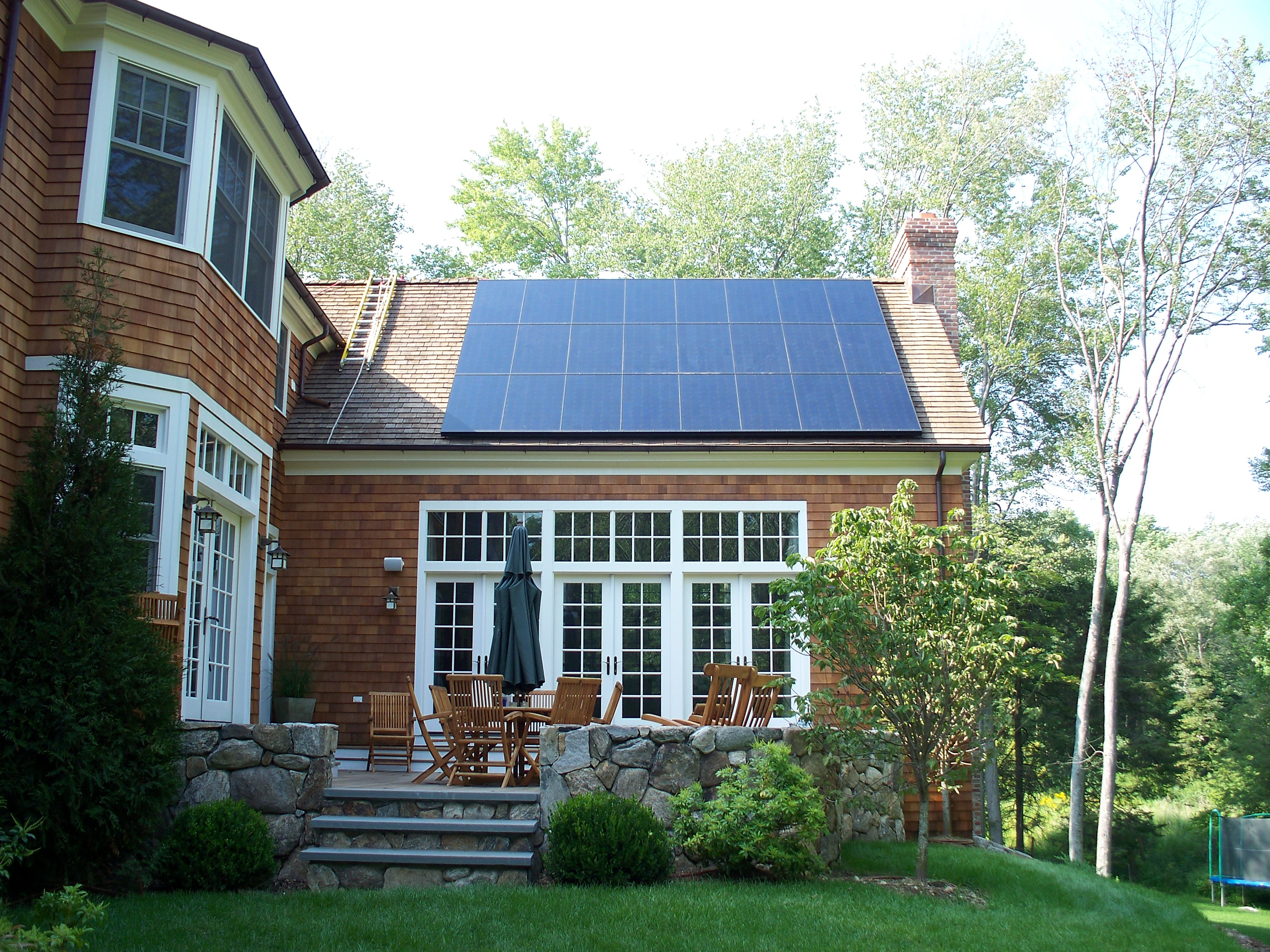
Solar installation, Westport

Solar power in Connecticut establishes Connecticut as the second state in the US to reach grid parity, after Hawaii, due to the high average cost of electricity. Installing solar panels for a home provides an estimated 15.6% return on investment.

CT Solar Lease was a program to install solar panels at no up-front cost, and a fixed lease price for 15 years, with an option to extend the lease for five years at a reduced cost. CT Solar Lease owns and sells the RECs generated by the system, but turns over all but $15/REC plus 100% of the sale over $30, or 50% of the sale of the REC up to $30/REC, to the homeowner in a Solar Dividends account for maintenance and to allow the purchase of the system at the end of the lease. RECs sold for from $18 to $24 each. Applications ended on August 19, 2011.

== Regulations ==
Connecticut's renewable portfolio standard requires 7% of power in the state will be from renewable resources by 2010, and 23% by 2020. A bill passed in 2011 requires incentives that will produce at least 30 MW of new residential PV installed by the end of 2022. Net metering is available for all up to two MW sites, and is reconciled annually at either the avoided cost or the time of use/generation rate, which is higher but requires time of use metering.

== Currently operating (Note: As of December 31, 2025) ==
Solar Facilities in Connecticut
#	Plant Name	Utility Name	County	Capacity (MW)	Operating Year
1	ALDI DC 2	Powerflex	Hartford	1.2	2018
2	Adams Solar	Ecos Energy LLC	New London	1.0	2018
3	Advance Stores Company, Inc	Tesla Inc.	Hartford	1.0	2014
4	Amazon BDL3 Solar Project	Solar Star Prime 1 LLC	New Haven	1.0	2019
5	Amazon BDL4	Telyon AMZ Windsor LLC	Hartford	3.9	2025
6	Antares-GRE 314 East Lyme LLC	MN8 Energy LLC	New London	4.0	2014
7	Barrett Farm Solar - Phase I	Onyx Asset Services Group	Windham	1.7	2017
8	Barrow Solar	Ecos Energy LLC	Tolland	2.0	2021
9	Becton Dickinson Ground & Roof Top	Madison Energy Investments LLC	Litchfield	2.0	2018
10	Becton Dickinson Ground & Roof Top	Madison Energy Investments LLC	Litchfield	0.5	2019
11	Benz Solar 1	Ecos Energy LLC	New Haven	1.0	2025
12	Benz Solar 2	Ecos Energy LLC	New Haven	1.0	2025
13	Bilton Solar	Ecos Energy LLC	Tolland	2.0	2023
14	Blair Solar	Ecos Energy LLC	Tolland	1.0	2021
15	Brass Mill Center	Brass Mill Center	New Haven	3.4	2017
16	Bristol Solar One, LLC	DG Connecticut III, LLC	Hartford	3.0	2021
17	Bunce	LSE Indus LLC	Litchfield	2.0	2022
18	Burlington Solar 1	DG Connecticut III, LLC	Hartford	3.5	2022
19	CMEEC - Bozrah	Tesla Inc.	New London	2.5	2016
20	CMEEC - Navy NE Trident	Tesla Inc.	New London	1.0	2017
21	CMEEC - Norwich Stott St Solar Hybrid	Tesla Inc.	New London	3.5	2016
22	CMEEC - Polaris Park Solar Hybrid	Tesla Inc.	New London	3.5	2017
23	CMEEC - Rogers Rd Solar	Tesla Inc.	New London	1.3	2017
24	CP East Hampton I & II Solar	NJR Clean Energy Ventures Corporation	Middlesex	2.0	2021
25	CP Middletown Solar I LLC	Green Street Power Partners	Middlesex	1.0	2019
26	CP Middletown Solar II LLC	Green Street Power Partners	Middlesex	1.0	2019
27	CTGB Maloney and Webster	TotalEnergies Renewables USA LLC	Tolland	2.0	2025
28	CTGB Manson Youth	TotalEnergies Renewables USA LLC	New Haven	2.0	2024
29	CTGB Osborn	TotalEnergies Renewables USA LLC	Tolland	1.8	2024
30	Canis Major Solar Farm	LSE Canis Major LLC	Hartford	2.0	2016
31	Canis Minor Solar Farm	LSE Canis Minor LLC	Litchfield	1.0	2016
32	Clinton Solar	Ecos Energy LLC	New London	1.0	2021
33	Conn Mun Electric Energy Coop	Tesla Inc.	New London	1.0	2016
34	Corbin Russwin Phase 3 Berlin	Powerflex	Hartford	1.0	2018
35	DWW Solar ll	DWW Solar ll LLC	Hartford	36.9	2019
36	Dickinson Solar (CT)	Ecos Energy LLC	Windham	2.0	2020
37	Dynamic Energy CT STAG	Milford Pepes Farm Road Solar LLC	New Haven	1.5	2023
38	East Windsor	NJR Clean Energy Ventures Corporation	Hartford	4.0	2025
39	East Windsor Solar One	DG Connecticut III, LLC	Hartford	5.0	2021
40	East Windsor Solar Two	East Windsor Solar Two, LLC	Hartford	4.0	2025
41	Ellington - 277 Sadds Mill	Onyx Asset Services Group	Tolland	2.0	2024
42	Emerald Gardens PKI, LLC	Emerald Gardens PKI, LLC	Fairfield	1.6	2021
43	Enfield Solar One	Enfield Solar One, LLC	Hartford	4.0	2024
44	FedEx Middletown	VCP Realty, LLC	Middlesex	1.5	2024
45	Few Solar	Ecos Energy LLC	Tolland	1.0	2021
46	Franklin Solar (CT)	Ecos Energy LLC	New London	1.0	2018
47	Fusion Solar Center LLC	Fusion Solar Centre, L.L.C	New London	20.0	2018
48	Glastonbury Solar One	NJR Clean Energy Ventures Corporation	Hartford	3.0	2025
49	Gravel Pit Solar, LLC	Gravel Pit Solar, LLC	Hartford	120.0	2025
50	Hamilton Solar	Ecos Energy LLC	New London	1.0	2018
51	Hartford Landfill Solar EGF	Materials Innovation Recycling Authority	Hartford	1.0	2014
52	IKEA New Haven Rooftop PV & Fuel Cell	IKEA Property Inc	New Haven	0.8	2012
53	Jackson Solar (CT)	Ecos Energy LLC	New London	1.0	2019
54	Jefferson Solar (CT)	Ecos Energy LLC	New London	1.0	2018
55	Madison Solar (CT)	Ecos Energy LLC	Tolland	1.0	2021
56	Manchester Community College East	Onyx Asset Services Group	Hartford	1.0	2018
57	Manchester Community College North	Onyx Asset Services Group	Hartford	1.0	2018
58	McHenry Solar	Ecos Energy LLC	Windham	1.0	2021
59	New Britain - 142 Deming Rd	Onyx Asset Services Group	Hartford	1.2	2025
60	Niagara Bottling - Bloomfield	Westbound Solar 3, LLC	Hartford	2.8	2022
61	Norcap North	LSE Canes Venatici LLC	Hartford	2.0	2017
62	Norcap South	LSE Coma Berenices LLC	Hartford	2.0	2017
63	Norfolk Landfill Solar Project	NJR Clean Energy Ventures Corporation	Litchfield	4.0	2024
64	North Franklin Solar	NJR Clean Energy Ventures Corporation	New London	5.0	2025
65	North Haven Solar One	North Haven Solar One, LLC	New Haven	1.6	2024
66	North Stonington Solar Center, LLC	Adapture Renewables, Inc.	New London	15.0	2022
67	Nutmeg Solar	Nutmeg Solar LLC	Hartford	19.6	2020
68	Park Solar	Ecos Energy LLC	New Haven	1.0	2023
69	Plainfield Solar 1	Ecos Energy LLC	Windham	1.0	2020
70	Plainfield Solar 2	Ecos Energy LLC	Windham	1.0	2020
71	Platt Hill	LSE Pictor LLC	Litchfield	2.0	2022
72	Powder Hill	LSE Delphinus LLC	Hartford	2.0	2020
73	Quinebaug Solar	Quinebaug Solar, LLC	Windham	49.4	2021
74	Raffia Road Solar Project	NJR Clean Energy Ventures Corporation	Hartford	4.0	2024
75	SR Litchfield	SR Litchfield, LLC	Litchfield	19.8	2025
76	SR North Stonington	SR North Stonington, LLC	New London	12.0	2024
77	Sand Road	LSE Phoenix LLC	Litchfield	2.0	2021
78	Sherman Solar	Ecos Energy LLC	New London	1.0	2019
79	Sikorsky Aircraft CHP	Sikorsky Aircraft Corporation	Fairfield	0.1	2010
80	Somers Solar Center, LLC	Onward Energy	Tolland	5.0	2013
81	Southington Solar One	DG Connecticut III, LLC	Hartford	4.7	2022
82	Stafford MS Ground Mount Community Solar	Town of Stafford - (CT)	Tolland	2.0	2016
83	Sydney Solar	Ecos Energy LLC	Windham	2.0	2020
84	Ticket Network South Windsor	Powerflex	Hartford	1.0	2018
85	Torrington Solar One, LLC	DG Connecticut III, LLC	Litchfield	2.0	2021
86	Town of Branford	Tesla Inc.	New Haven	1.1	2018
87	Town of Rocky Hill PV CSG	Tesla Inc.	Hartford	3.0	2018
88	UI RCP Bridgeport Seaside	United Illuminating Co	Fairfield	2.2	2016
89	Wallingford Solar	Wallingford Renewable Energy, LLC	New Haven	16.1	2021
90	Watertown Solar One, LLC	DG Connecticut III, LLC	Litchfield	2.0	2021
91	Wilson Solar (CT)	Ecos Energy LLC	New London	1.0	2018
92	Windsor Solar One	NJR Clean Energy Ventures Corporation	Hartford	3.0	2025
93	Woods Hill Solar	Woods Hill Solar, LLC	Windham	20.0	2018

== Statistics ==
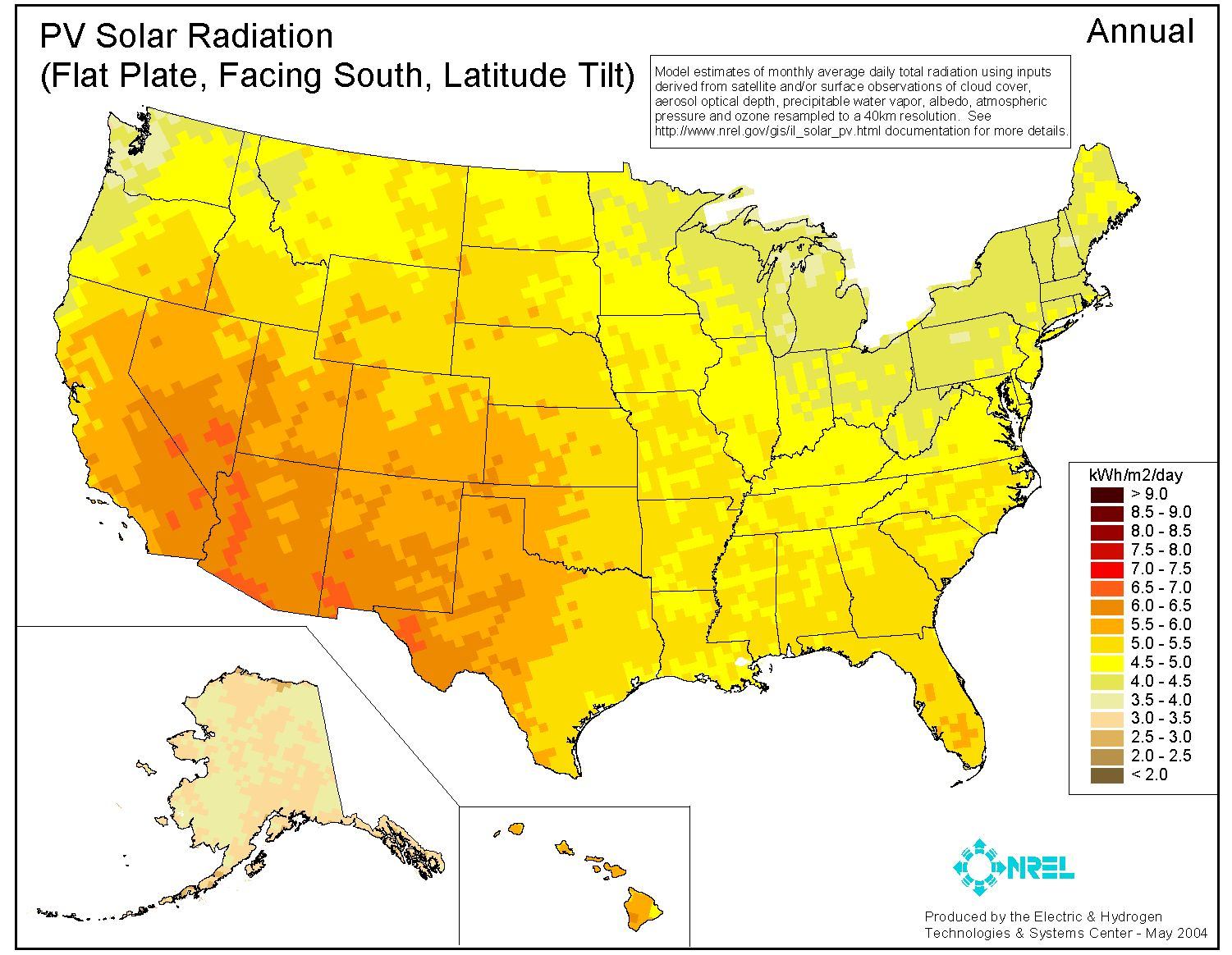
Average solar insolation

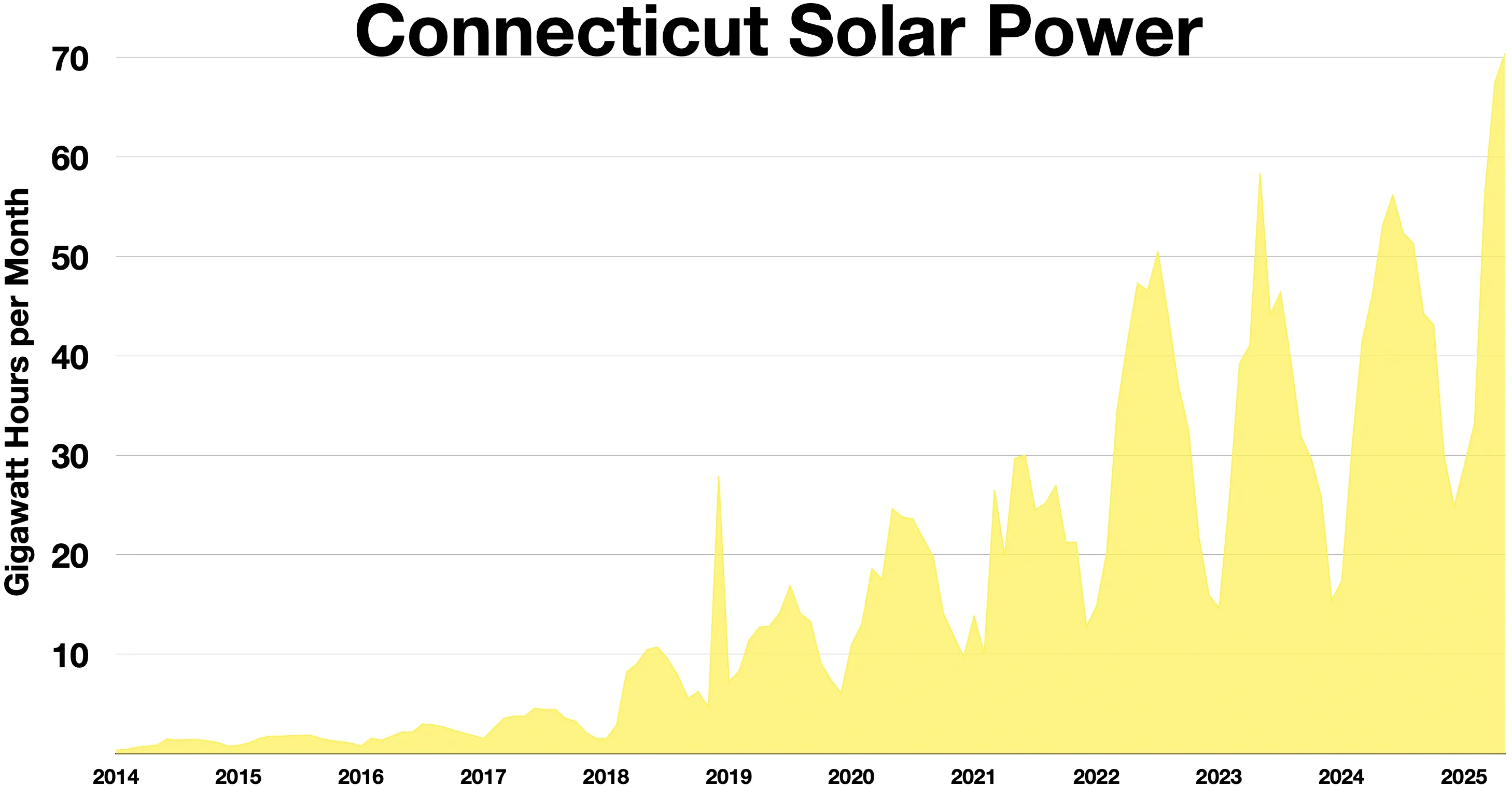
Connecticut solar power from 2014 to 2025

=== Potential generation ===
The average insolation in Connecticut is about four sun hours per day, and ranges from less than two in the winter to over five in the summer.

Source: NREL

=== Installed capacity ===
Connecticut electricity consumption in 2005 was 33,095 million kWh.

Connecticut grid-connected PV capacity (MW)
Year	Capacity	Installed	% change
2008	8.8	6.0	214%
2009	19.7	10.9	124%
2010	24.6	4.9	25%
2011	31.1	4.5	26%
2012	39.6	7.5	24%
2013	77.1	37.5	95%
2014	118.8	41.7	54%
2015	219	91	71%
2016	322	103	47%
2017	418	96	30%
2018	555	137	33%
2019	748	193	35%
2020	878.6	130.6	17%
2021	1,097.4	218.8	25%
2022	1,214	116.6	11%
2023	1,481	267	22%

=== Utility-scale generation ===
Utility-scale solar generation in Connecticut (GWh)
Year	Total	Jan	Feb	Mar	Apr	May	Jun	Jul	Aug	Sep	Oct	Nov	Dec
2014	9	0	0	0	1	1	1	1	1	1	1	1	1
2015	19	1	1	2	2	2	2	2	2	2	1	1	1
2016	25	1	2	1	2	2	2	3	3	3	2	2	2
2017	43	2	3	4	4	4	5	5	5	4	3	2	2
2018	107	2	3	8	9	11	11	10	8	6	6	5	28
2019	139	7	9	12	13	13	15	18	15	14	9	8	6
2020	228	12	14	19	20	25	25	26	23	21	16	14	13
2021	196	15	14	26	25	31	30	27	28				

== See also ==
- Wind power in Connecticut
- Solar power in the United States
- Renewable energy in the United States
