= Wind power in Connecticut =

Electricity from wind in one U.S. state

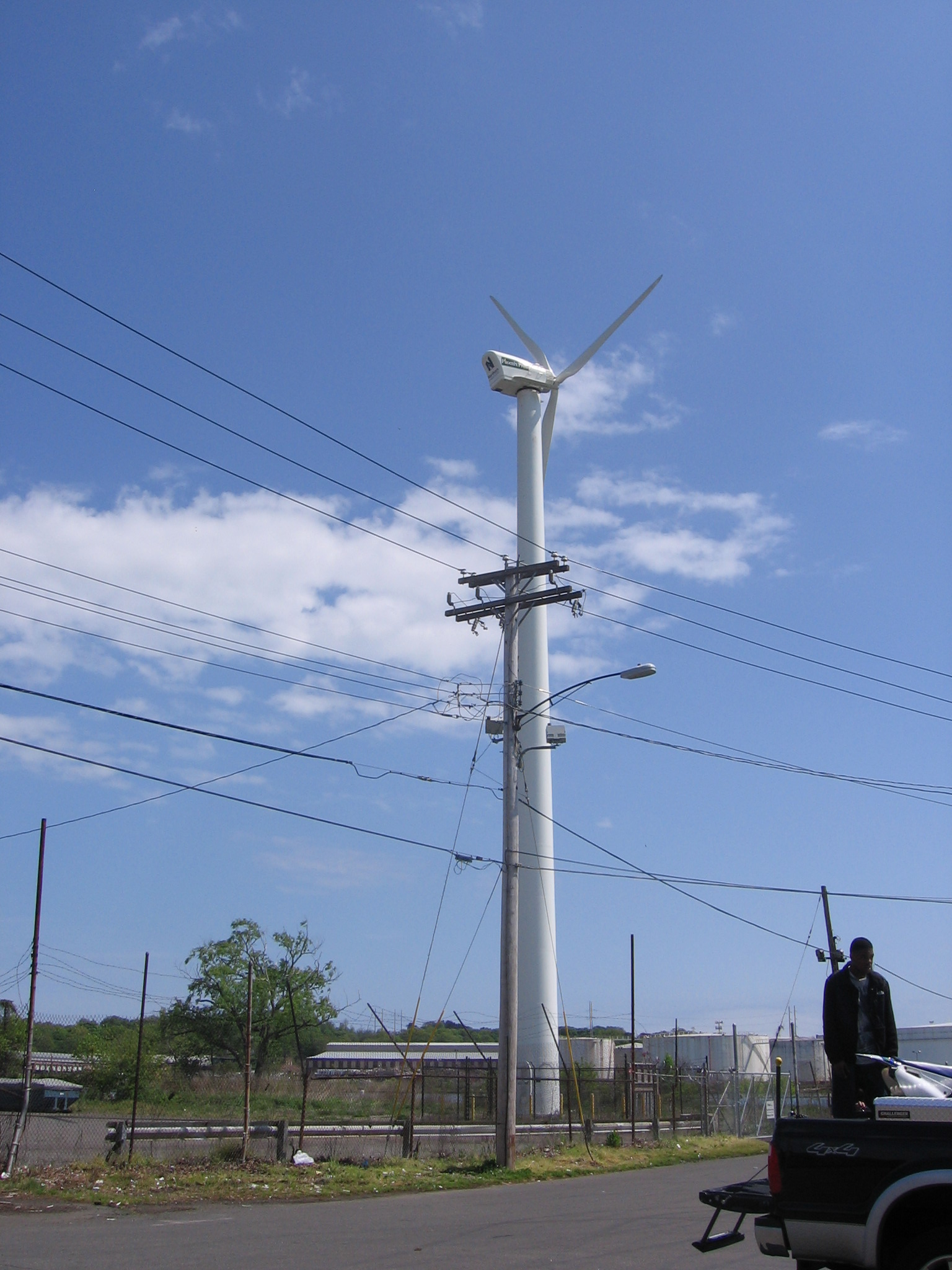
Wind turbine alongside Pearl Harbor Bridge in New Haven

The U.S. state of Connecticut has vast wind energy resources offshore as well as onshore although Connecticut was the last state in the United States to block the construction of utility scale wind turbines. Connecticut maintains a renewable portfolio standard that requires 21% of the state's electricity to come from renewable sources by 2020.

== Legislation ==
Until 2019, Connecticut was the only state in the United States to disallow the construction of utility-scale wind turbines. The state's two and a half year old ban on wind power was enacted in 2011, ostensibly to provide time for the Connecticut Siting Council to enact regulations governing the siting of wind turbines in the state. Those regulations were written in 2012 to address health and safety issues related to wind power, such as maximum noise levels and distances from neighboring properties, but the legislative committee tasked with approving state agency regulations has repeatedly refused to approve the regulations. On November 26, 2013, the Connecticut General Assembly's Regulation Review Committee, for the fourth time since 2012, blocked the Connecticut Siting Council's Regulations that would have ended the state's ban on new wind power projects. The committee, led by co-chairman State Representative Selim Noujaim, forced the Siting Council to withdraw its proposal. This ban stands in stark contrast to Connecticut’s renewable energy laws requiring utilities to purchase 27% clean electricity (23% renewable) by the year 2020.

Concerns about the development of regulations were documented at the CT Siting Council’s public forum on October 13, 2011, and its public hearing on July 24, 2012.

In its second draft of wind regulations, the CT Siting Council increased the setback distance from 1.1 times to 1.5 times the height of an industrial wind turbine from property lines. Drafts 1, 2 and 3 were each rejected without prejudice by the Regulations Review Committee. The CT Siting Council submitted the third rejected draft again, unchanged, for a vote of the Regulations Review Committee on November 26, 2013. During that meeting, the CT Siting Council decided to withdraw the previously rejected third draft instead of putting it to another vote.

The fourth draft was set for a vote at the April 22, 2014, meeting of the Regulations Review Committee. Changes in this draft include a financial assurance for decommissioning and requiring a 3/4 vote (rather than a simple majority) of the CT Siting Council for it to waive minimum setback distances and maximum shadow flicker on occupied structures. The CT Siting Council did not increase the setback distance.

== Potential ==
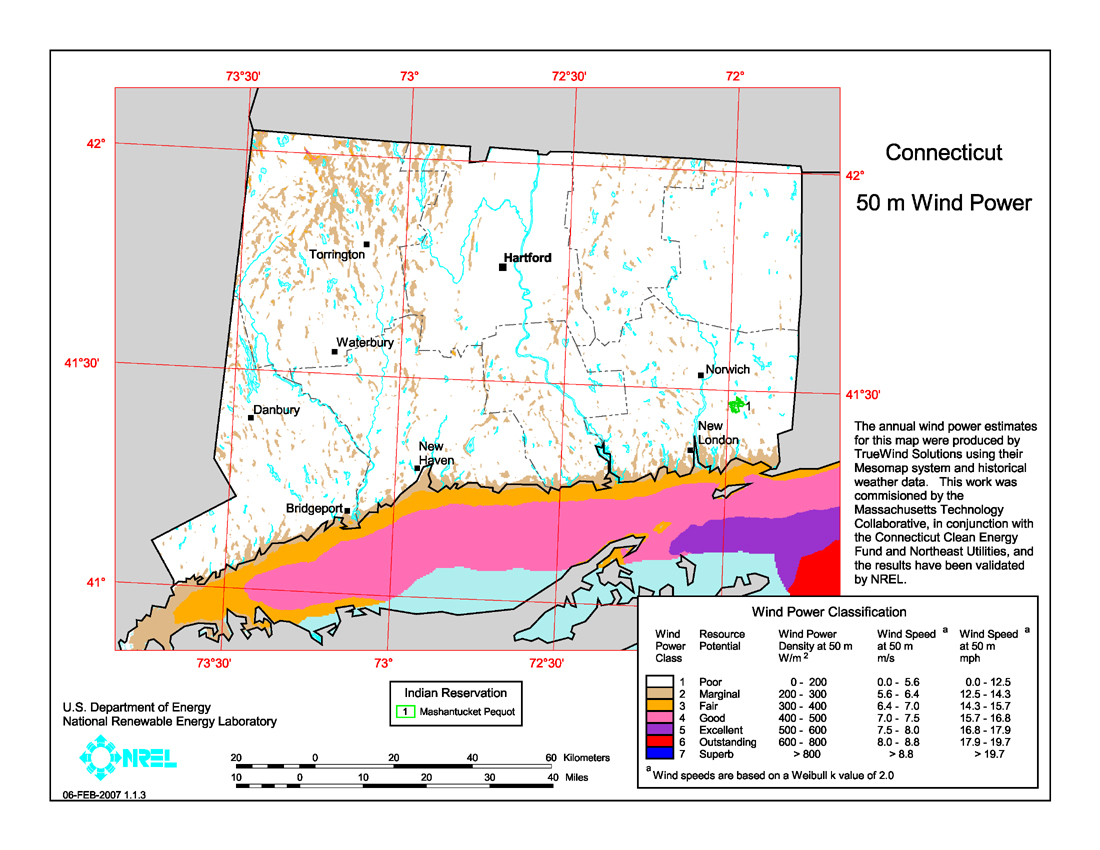
Connecticut wind resources at 50m

Estimates by the National Renewable Energy Laboratory indicate that Connecticut has potential to install 26.5 MW, of onshore wind power using 80 meter high wind turbines.

== Installed capacity ==
An animated map of installed wind power capacity in the U.S. from 1999 to 2015

Connecticut currently has three large scale wind turbines. These are:

- A Northwind 100 located in New Haven at Phoenix Press. The turbine, rated at 100 kW, is highly visible from Interstate 95 on the Pearl Harbor Memorial Bridge. It was installed around 2013.
- Two GE 2.5 megawatt turbines at Colebrook, which went online on October 16, 2015.

== Onshore cancelled proposals ==
=== Connecticut Wind Colebrook Project ===
Wind Colebrook is a permitted wind farm in Colebrook, Connecticut, developed by BNE Energy, with an expected capacity of 9.6 MW using 3 GE 1.6 MW wind turbines at Wind Colebrook North and three identical wind turbines at Wind Colebrook South. Wind Colebrook won a legal battle with their opponent, Fair Wind CT, in Connecticut Superior Court in October 2012, as a judge said that the six turbines would not unduly hurt the environment or harm the neighbors. The two rulings this week by Judge Henry Cohn, for two separate proposals of three turbines each, leaves BNE Energy Inc. closer to building the 9.6 MW project in Colebrook. The project is currently halted due to the ban on wind farms in Connecticut

Wind Colebrook North did not receive the required approval from the U.S. Army Corps. This agency agreed with the CT State Historic Preservation Office that the industrial turbines would have an adverse effect on Rock Hall, an estate designed by Addison Mizner and listed on the National Register of Historic Places.

On February 21, 2014, the CT Supreme Court heard oral arguments in FairWindCT’s appeal against the CT Siting Council and BNE Energy for the approvals of Wind Colebrook South and Wind Colebrook North. On September 15, 2014, the CT Supreme Court ruled unanimously in favor of the wind project and the CT Siting Council.

=== Connecticut Wind Prospect Project ===
Wind Prospect is a canceled wind generation project, developed by BNE Energy, with an expected capacity of 3.2 MW utilizing 2 GE 1.6 MW wind turbines in Prospect, Connecticut. The site is high on a ridge adjacent to and overlooking the New Naugatuck Reservoir. The predicted wind speeds and physical characteristics of the site are favorable for wind generation due to its elevation, orientation and topographical characteristics. The site is located within one hundred yards from the electrical grid. Wind Prospect would meet the annual electric power needs of approximately 25% of the Town’s residential electric users on average over the course of the year, and nearly 85% of the Town’s residential electric needs when the turbines are operating at full capacity. Wind Prospect would offset approximately 8 million pounds of carbon dioxide per year relative to conventional electricity generation. That is equivalent to the estimated annual emissions produced by 1,154 cars or consuming more than 14,046 barrels of oil.

Wind Prospect was denied by the CT Siting Council on May 12, 2011, which found "the visual effects...are in conflict with the policies of the State concerning such effects and are a sufficient reason to deny the petition."

== Offshore projects ==
=== Park City Wind and Bridgeport Harbor ===
In 2019, the state awarded a contract to Vineyard Wind to develop offshore power at New England Wind, (originally Park City Wind. The project is a proposed offshore wind farm being developed by Avangrid located about 23 miles (37 km) off the coast of Martha's Vineyard (MA), which will provide electriity to the state of Connecticut. The project takes its name from the nickname of Bridgeport, where an offshore wind port is being developed at Bridgeport Harbor to support the project. In October 2023, Avangrid canceled its contract with Connecticut due to higher development costs.

=== State Pier Port of New London ===
State Pier ion the Port of New London is being developed as an offshore wind port. It will support projects such as the South Fork Wind Farm, Sunrise Wind, and Revolution Wind.

Wind farm	Offshore BOEM wind energy lease area			Receiving state	Capacity (MW)	Projected completion	Turbines	Developer/utility	Regulatory agency	Refs
New England Wind	Offshore Massachusetts OCS-A 0501	23 miles off the coast of Martha's Vineyard (MA)		CT	804	2025		Avangrid; Copenhagen Infrastructure Partners	Connecticut DEEP	
Revolution Wind	Offshore Rhode Island; OCS-A 0486 (North Lease Area)	halfway between Montauk Point (NY) & Martha’s Vineyard (MA)	97,498 acres (39,456 ha)	RI; CT	700	2025	Siemens Gamesa 8MW SG 8.0-167	Ørsted; Eversource; National Grid; United Illuminating	Connecticut DEEP; Rhode Island PUC	

== See also ==
- Solar power in Connecticut
- Wind power in the United States
- Renewable energy in the United States
- List of U.S. states by electricity production from renewable sources
