= Grigori Tokaty =

Soviet rocket scientist and politician

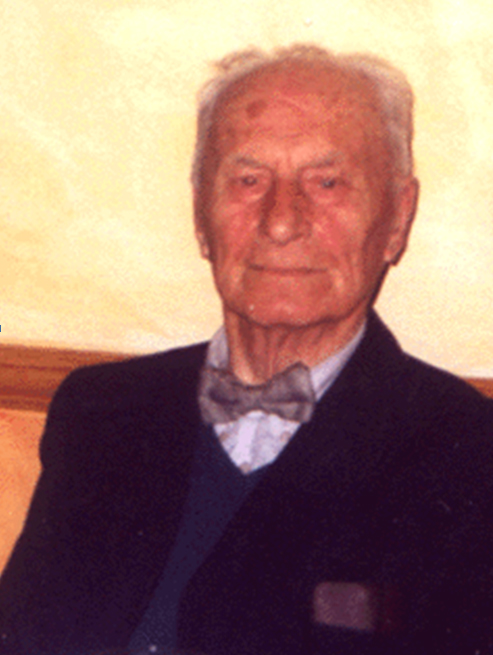
- Grigori Tokaty in 2001
- Born: 13 October 1909; Seker, Terek Oblast, Russian Empire
- Died: 23 November 2003 (aged 94); Cheam, Surrey, England
- Education: Zhukovsky Air Force Engineering Academy
- Known for: Aerodynamics and rocket technology
- Spouse: Aza Baeva
- Scientific career
- Fields: Physics

Grigory Aleksandrovich Tokaev (Iron Ossetic: Токаты Ахмæты фырт Гогки, romanized: Tokaty Axmæty fyrt Gogki; Russian: Григорий Александрович Токаев) also known as Grigory Tokaty; (13 October 1909 – 23 November 2003) was a Soviet rocket scientist and politician. Eventually turned anti-communist, he defected to the United Kingdom and became a long-standing critic of Stalin's USSR.

During his time in Britain, he also worked to create material for the Information Research Department (IRD), a secret branch of the UK Foreign Office which promoted anti-communist propaganda during the Cold War.

== Pre-war life ==
Tokaty served as Head of the Aeronautics Laboratory at the Zhukovsky Academy from 1938 to 1941. After receiving his doctorate in technical sciences in 1941 he continued to lecture at the academy. Simultaneously, he worked as Acting Head of the Department of Aviation at the Moscow Engineering Institute. One of his tasks was to study the possibility of developing a medium-range winged rocket.

=== Underground opposition ===
At first, in his own words, a 'young unquestioning fanatic', Tokaty was a Communist Party activist, and was re-elected to the Trade Union Committee and the Komsomol bureau multiple times. Tokaty became disillusioned with socialism later in his life, and joined an opposition group with the aim of removing Stalin from power. He reported in his memoirs that his opposition group wanted to establish a liberal democracy in the USSR.

== World War II and the aftermath ==
Hitler launched Operation Barbarossa, the invasion of the Soviet Union, in 1941, rapidly overrunning Soviet front-line forces. The academy's staff was evacuated to Sverdlovsk in the Ural mountains. Tokaty returned to Moscow during the Battle of Moscow. He later flew in bombing raids over Stalingrad using American bombers delivered through lend-lease.

By the end of World War II, Tokaty had become a leading Party representative and academic at the Zhukovsky Academy and the Moscow Engineering Institute, both in Moscow.

After the German capitulation in May 1945, in the following month Tokaty was sent to Berlin. This was to serve on the Soviet Control Commission working directly under Marshals Georgi Zhukov and Vasily Sokolovsky. As such, Tokaty gained access to top-secret communications between the General Staff and the Kremlin.

== Defection ==
Tokaty was afraid of his links with the opposition being discovered. The fear of being arrested and his hatred for Stalin's government culminated in his defection to the United Kingdom. He and his family crossed into the British sector of occupied Berlin and applied for asylum. He arrived in Britain in November 1947. He was given a false identity and was protected by the British intelligence services during his debriefing, since there was strong evidence that Soviet agents were planning to assassinate him.

== Life in the UK ==
Tokaty became a professor in the Department of Aeronautics and Space Technology at The City University in London from 1967 to 1975. He regularly appeared in New Scientist magazine. He passed on Soviet military secrets to the British government and also assisted the Information Research Department in disseminating anti-Communist propaganda.

Tokaty appeared in episode five of the World War II documentary series The World at War in which he gave a recollection of his experiences. Several historians have used his account of events to study the history of the Soviet Union.

A fictional Tokaty appears in the eleventh and final novel of Upton Sinclair's Lanny Budd series, The Return of Lanny Budd, as Lanny's rescuer from a Soviet MGB prison in East Berlin. Sinclair acknowledges Tokaty's contribution to the novel in the book's Acknowledgements section.

Tokaty died in Surrey, England in 2003, aged 94.

== Books ==
- Stalin Means War (1951)
- Betrayal of an Ideal (1954)
- Comrade X (1956)
- Soviet Imperialism (1956)
- A History and Philosophy of Fluid Mechanics (1971)
