= Fasting =

Willing abstinence from, or reduced consumption of, food and/or drink

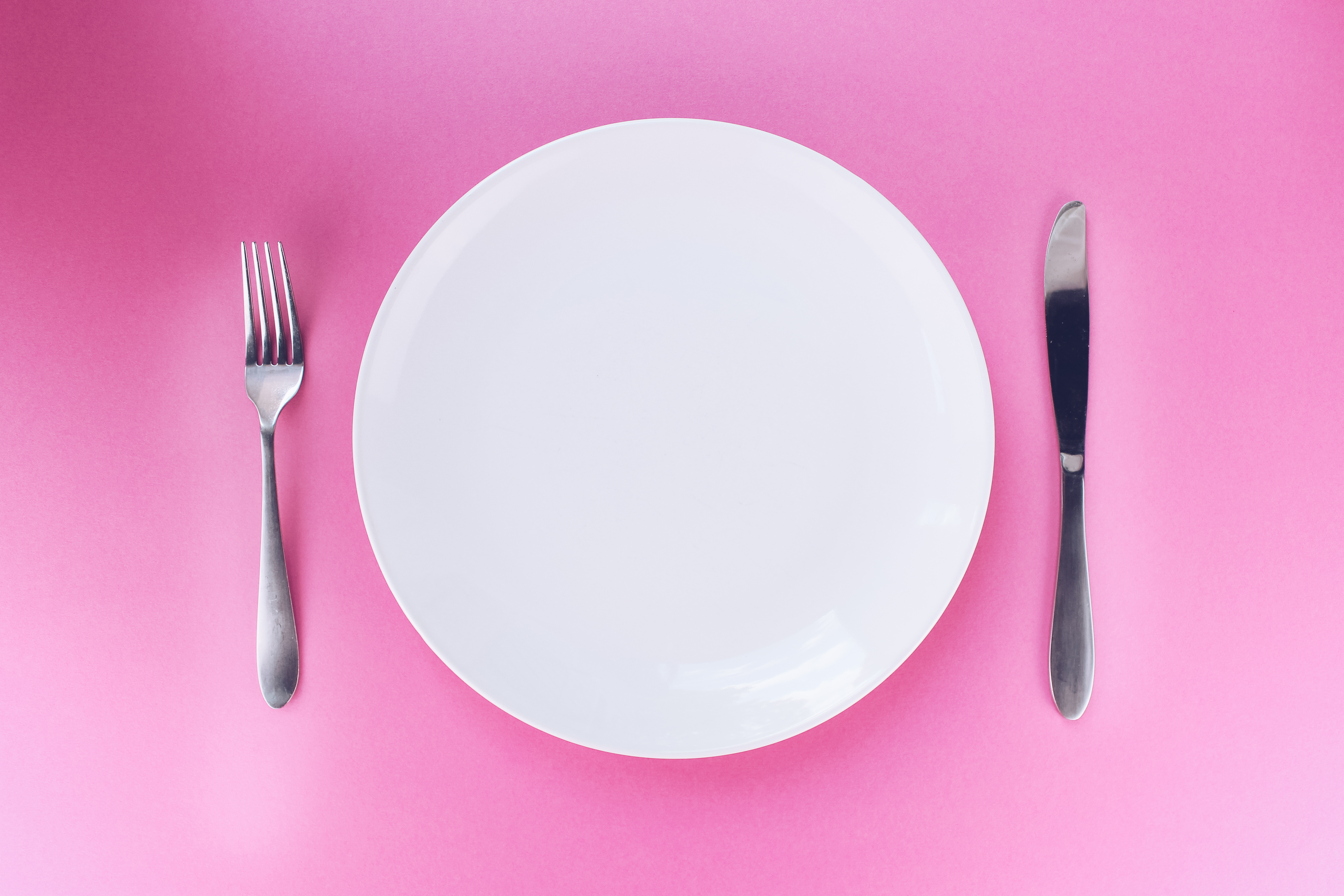
An empty plate

Fasting is the act of refraining from eating, and sometimes drinking. However, from a physiological context, "fasting" may refer to the metabolic status of a person who has not eaten overnight (before "breakfast"), or to the metabolic state achieved after complete digestion and absorption of a meal. Metabolic changes in the fasting state begin after absorption of a meal (typically 3–5 hours after eating).

A diagnostic fast is a prolonged fast, from 1–100 hours long (depending on age), conducted under observation, to facilitate the investigation of a health complication (usually hypoglycemia). Many people may also fast as part of a medical procedure or a check-up, such as preceding a colonoscopy or surgery, or before certain medical tests. Intermittent fasting is a technique sometimes used for weight loss or other health benefits that incorporates regular fasting into a person's dietary schedule. Fasting may also be part of a religious ritual, often associated with specific scheduled fast days, as determined by the religion, or be applied as a public demonstration for a given cause, in a practice known as a hunger strike.

== Health effects ==
Alternate-day fasting (alternating between a 24-hour "fast day" when the person eats less than 25% of usual energy needs, followed by a 24-hour non-fasting "feast day" period) has been shown to improve cardiovascular and metabolic biomarkers similarly to a calorie restriction diet in people who are overweight, obese or have metabolic syndrome.

A 2021 review found that moderate alternate-day fasting for two to six months was associated with reductions of body weight, body mass index, and cardiometabolic risk factors in overweight or obese adults.

=== Medical application ===
Fasting is almost always practiced prior to surgery or other procedures that require general anesthesia because of the risk of pulmonary aspiration of gastric contents after induction of anesthesia (i.e., vomiting and inhaling the vomit, causing life-threatening aspiration pneumonia). Additionally, certain medical tests, such as cholesterol testing (lipid panel) or certain blood glucose measurements require fasting for several hours so that a baseline can be established.

=== Mental health ===
In one review, fasting improved alertness, mood, and subjective feelings of well-being, possibly improving overall symptoms of depression, and boosting cognitive performance.

=== Weight loss ===
==== Intermittent fasting ====
There is little evidence to suggest that intermittent fasting for periods shorter than 24 hours is effective for sustained weight loss in obese adults.

==== Prolonged fasting ====
Prolonged fasting (also called extended fasting or water fasting) involves periods of fasting above 24 hours, typically in the range of 5–20 days. In early fasting, the body operates under a relatively high level of gluconeogenesis, though this eventually decreases as the body's metabolism switches into ketosis, causing ketones to replace glucose as the primary energy source in the central nervous system. As prolonged fasting continues, drastic decreases in sodium, potassium, magnesium, and other minerals are noted, which can lead to hyponatremia. In some diet systems, these losses are offset with non-caloric electrolyte supplements, such as electrolyte beverages. Typical observed weight loss under prolonged fasting averages at 0.9 kg per day during the first week and 0.3 kg per day by the third week. In early fasting, during periods of high gluconeogenesis, roughly two-thirds of weight lost is lean muscle mass as opposed to fat. After the gluconeogenic phase, however, the ratio of body fat lost to lean tissue lost becomes roughly 7:6.

The longest documented fast in history was that of Angus Barbieri, a Scottish man who fasted for 382 days, from 14 June 1965 to 30 June 1966. He subsisted on tea, coffee, sparkling water, vitamins and yeast extract while living at home in Tayport, Scotland, frequently visiting Maryfield Hospital for medical evaluation. Barbieri went from almost 33 stone / 456 pounds (207 kg) to 13 stone / 180 pounds (82 kg), losing 20 stone / 276 pounds (125 kg) and setting a record for the length of a fast.

=== Longevity ===
There is no sound clinical evidence that fasting can promote longevity in humans.

== Adverse effects ==
=== Refeeding syndrome ===
Refeeding syndrome is a metabolic disturbance which occurs as a result of reinstitution of nutrition in people and animals who are starved, severely malnourished, or metabolically stressed because of severe illness. When too much food or liquid nutrition supplement is eaten during the initial four to seven days following a malnutrition event, the production of glycogen, fat and protein in cells may cause low serum concentrations of potassium, magnesium and phosphate. The electrolyte imbalance may cause neurologic, pulmonary, cardiac, neuromuscular, and hematologic symptoms—many of which, if severe enough, may result in death.

Refeeding syndrome can occur when someone does not eat for several days at a time usually beginning after 4–5 days with no food.

=== Gallstones ===
Fasting can increase the risk of developing gallstones for some people. This is thought to occur due to decreased gallbladder movement with no food to be digested, which can cause the bile to become over-concentrated with cholesterol, combined with the liver secreting extra cholesterol into bile as the body metabolizes fat during rapid weight loss, further exacerbating the situation.

== Political application ==
Fasting is often used to make a political statement, to protest, or to bring awareness to a cause. A hunger strike is a method of non-violent resistance in which participants fast as an act of political protest, or to provoke feelings of guilt, or to achieve a goal such as a policy change. A spiritual fast incorporates personal spiritual beliefs with the desire to express personal principles, sometimes in the context of social injustice.

The political leader Gandhi undertook several long fasts as political and social protests. Gandhi's fasts had a significant impact on the British Raj and the Indian population generally.

In Northern Ireland in 1981, a prisoner, Bobby Sands, was part of the 1981 Irish hunger strike, protesting for better rights in prison. Sands had just been elected to the British Parliament and died after 66 days of not eating. 100,000 people attended his funeral, and the strike ended only after nine other men died. In all, ten men survived without food for 46 to 73 days.

The American civil rights activist César Chávez undertook several spiritual fasts, including a 25-day fast in 1968 promoting the principle of nonviolence and a fast of 'thanksgiving and hope' to prepare for pre-arranged civil disobedience by farm workers. Chávez regarded a spiritual fast as "a personal spiritual transformation". Other progressive campaigns have adopted the tactic.

== Religious views ==
Fasting is practiced in various religions, and details of fasting practices differ.

Yom Kippur, Tisha B'av, Fast of Esther, Tzom Gedalia, the Seventeenth of Tamuz, the Tenth of Tevet, and Fast of the Firstborn are examples of fasting in Judaism. Yom Kippur and Tisha B'Av are 25-hour fasts in which observers abstain from consuming any food or liquid from sunset until nightfall the next day and include other restrictions. The fasts of Esther, Gedalia, Tamuz, and Tevet all last from dawn until nightfall and therefore length varies depending on the time of the year. The Fast of the Firstborn is not biblically mandated and can therefore be ended early in the case of a seudat mitzvah.

Lent is a common period of fasting in Christianity. In the Catholic Church, the current practice of fast and abstinence is regulated by Canons 1250–1253 of the 1983 code. They specify that all Fridays throughout the year, and the time of Lent are penitential times throughout the entire Church. All persons who have completed their fourteenth year are bound by the law of abstinence on all Fridays unless they are solemnities, and again on Ash Wednesday and Good Friday. Fasting must be observed by those who have attained their majority, until the beginning of their sixtieth year. The precept to both fast and abstinence must be observed on Ash Wednesday and Good Friday. Certain communities of Lutheran Churches advocate fasting during designated times such as Lent, especially on Ash Wednesday and Good Friday. The rogation days are traditional days of fasting, as well as abstinence of meat, in Lutheranism. A Handbook for the Discipline of Lent delineates the following Lutheran fasting guidelines:

1. Fast on Ash Wednesday and Good Friday with only one simple meal during the day, usually without meat.
2. Refrain from eating meat (bloody foods) on all Fridays in Lent, substituting fish for example.
3. Eliminate a food or food group for the entire season. Especially consider saving rich and fatty foods for Easter.
4. Consider not eating before receiving Communion in Lent.
5. Abstain from or limit a favorite activity (television, movies, etc.) for the entire season, and spend more time in prayer, Bible study, and reading devotional material.

In addition to the fasts mentioned above, Catholics must also observe the Eucharistic Fast, which in the Latin Church involves taking nothing but water or medicine into the body for one hour before receiving the Eucharist. In Lutheranism, the Small Catechism, with regard to the Eucharistic Fast, states: "Fasting and bodily preparation are indeed a fine outward training". Though voluntary in Lutheranism, the Eucharistic Fast is kept from midnight until the reception of the Eucharist. Theologically, the "Eucharistic Fast is always in anticipation for the Eucharistic Feast, a reminder of the Last Day when all poverty is abolished, the necessity of fasting has ceased and every prayer answered as all of God's people celebrate the marriage supper of the Lamb."

Eastern Orthodox Christians fast during specified fasting seasons of the year, which include not only the better-known Great Lent, but also fasts on every Wednesday and Friday (except on special holidays), together with extended fasting periods before Christmas (the Nativity Fast), after Easter (the Apostles' Fast) and in early August (the Dormition Fast).

Members of the Church of Jesus Christ of Latter-day Saints generally abstain from food and drink for two consecutive meals in a 24-hour period, on the first Sunday of each month, and members are invited to donate the money they would have used for those meals to assist others in need (called a fast offering).

Muslims fast during the month of Ramadan each year. The fast includes refraining from consuming any food or liquid from dawn until sunset. It is a religious obligation for all Muslims unless they are children or are physically unable to fast.

Fasting is a feature of ascetic traditions in religions such as Hinduism and Buddhism.

Mahayana traditions that follow the Brahma's Net Sutra may recommend that the laity fast "during the six days of fasting each month and the three months of fasting each year".

Members of the Baháʼí Faith observe a Nineteen Day Fast from sunrise to sunset during March each year.

== In alternative medicine ==
Although practitioners of alternative medicine promote "cleansing the body" through fasting, (as though it were a diagnostic fast) the concept of "detoxification" is a marketing myth with little scientific basis for its rationale or efficacy.

During the early 20th century, fasting was promoted by alternative health writers such as Hereward Carrington, Edward H. Dewey, Bernarr Macfadden, Frank McCoy, Edward Earle Purinton, Upton Sinclair, and Wallace Wattles. All of these writers were either involved in the natural hygiene or New Thought movement. Arnold Ehret's pseudoscientific Mucusless Diet Healing System espoused fasting.

Linda Hazzard put her patients on such strict fasts that some of them died of starvation. She was responsible for the death of more than 40 patients under her care.

In 1911, Upton Sinclair authored The Fasting Cure, which made sensational claims of fasting curing practically all diseases, including cancer and syphilis. Sinclair states that he recommends fasting for all diseases except tuberculosis. Sinclair has been described as "the most credulous of faddists". In 1932, physician Morris Fishbein listed fasting as a fad diet and commented that "prolonged fasting is never necessary and invariably does harm".

== Types of fasting ==
=== Type by religion ===
- Lent
- Great Lent
- Tenth of Tevet
- Seventeenth of Tamuz
- Fast of Gedalia
- Vrata
- Fast of Esther
- Tisha B'Av
- Yom Kippur
- Fast of the Firstborn
- Ramadan
- Nativity Fast
- Apostles Fast
- Dormition Fast
- Fasting in Buddhism
- Nineteen Day Fast
- Daniel Fast
- Black Fast
- Fasting in Jainism

=== Type by method ===
- Electrolyte supplemented water fasting
- Dry fasting
- Juice fasting
- Water fasting

=== Type by schedule ===
- Alternate day
- Eat: stop: eat
- Intermittent fasting
- One Meal A Day (OMAD)/Warrior diet
- Prolonged fasting
- The 16/8 or 14/10
- The 40-days and 40-nights
- The 5:2

=== Type by motivation ===
- Autophagy
- Avoidant/restrictive food intake disorder
- Calorie restriction
- Drunkorexia
- Hunger strike
- Inedia
- Insulin resistance management
- Longevity
- Sallekhana
- Weight loss

== See also ==
- Asceticism
- Autophagy
- Black Fast
- Calorie restriction
- Fasting and longevity
- Fasting in Jainism
- Force-feeding
- Inedia
- Santhara
- Weight loss

== Sources ==
- Code of Canon Law (CIC), Rome: Libreria Editrice Vaticana, 4 November 2003 [1983].
