= A World to Win =

"A world to win" is a phrase written by Karl Marx in The Communist Manifesto, as part of the famous quotation: “Let the ruling classes tremble at a Communistic revolution. The proletarians have nothing to lose but their chains. They have a world to win. Workingmen of all countries unite!”

A World to Win may also refer to:

- A World to Win (Conroy novel), a 1933 novel by Jack Conroy
- A World to Win (Sinclair novel), the seventh novel in Upton Sinclair's Lanny Budd series
- A World to Win (magazine), the theoretical journal of the Revolutionary Internationalist Movement
- "A World to Win", a song by Gorgoroth, from the album Incipit Satan
