= Flivver =

Flivver is early twentieth-century American slang for an automobile or cart, typically of poor quality.

It may also refer to:

- Flivver, nickname for the Ford Model T, the first mass-produced automobile
- Flivver, nickname for the Paulding-class destroyer, a series of U.S. Navy destroyers
- Flivver, nickname for the Smith-class destroyer, first ocean-going destroyers in the U.S. Navy
- The Flivver King, a 1937 novel by Upton Sinclair
- Flivver Lo-V (New York City Subway car), a type of subway car built in 1915
- Ford Flivver, a single-seat aircraft that did not go into production
- Luke's Fatal Flivver, a 1916 American short comedy film
- A small space cruiser, in Isaac Asimov's 1955 short-story “The Portable Star”
