= Thomas Werner Laurie =

British publisher

Thomas Werner Laurie (1866–1944) was a London publisher of books that were avant-garde in some cases, racy in others.

== Early life ==
Laurie was born in Edinburgh. His father was a Scot and his mother a German.

== Career ==
He founded his T. Werner Laurie Ltd. publishing house in 1904 and was known for publishing the works of Yeats, Wilde, and Moore as well as other authors of lesser renown.

He published The Jungle by Upton Sinclair when that work had been rejected for publication in England by other publishers, and Sinclair stayed with Laurie for many years in gratitude, publishing World's End and other novels in Sinclair's Lanny Budd series.

Other books issued in the firm's eclectic publishing programme included The Encyclopaedia of Sex and The History of Torture through the Ages.

In 1946, after Laurie's death, his publishing firm was purchased by the financier Clarence Hatry, and it continued to operate in premises above Hatchards booksellers at 187 Piccadilly, London, with George Greenfield as the manager.

== Book series published by T. Werner Laurie Ltd. ==
- The Cathedral Series (author of each volume: T. Francis Bumpus)
- Classical Library
- Eclectic Library (also known as: T. Werner Laurie's Eclectic Library: Books for the Household)
- The Farmer's Library
- The Garden Booklets
- The House Decoration Series
- Laurie's Half-Crown Net Novels
- Laurie's Shilling (Net) Books
- Laurie's Shilling Reprints
- Laurie's Two-Shillings Net Novels
- The Leather Booklets
- The Library of Sports
- Live Books Resurrected
- The Music Lover's Library
- Old English Towns
- Sixpenny Books
- The Old Time Booklets
- Sex Education Library (also known as: The Library of Sex Education)
- Uniform Library Edition of the Works of Guy de Maupassant
- Uniform Library Edition of the Works of Pierre Loti

== Personal life ==
Thomas Werner Laurie married twice. His second wife was (Elizabeth Mary) Beatrice (born 1895). Their daughter, Joan Werner Laurie (1920–1964), edited She, a periodical for women.
