= King Coal =

1917 novel by Upton Sinclair

1921 reprint of first edition

King Coal is a 1917 novel by Upton Sinclair that describes the poor working conditions in the coal mining industry in the western United States during the 1910s, from the perspective of a single protagonist, Hal Warner. The book is based on the 1913-1914 Colorado coal strikes. The sequel to King Coal was posthumously published under the title, The Coal War. As in his earlier work, The Jungle, Sinclair uses the novel to express his socialist viewpoint.

== Plot ==
Hal Warner, a rich young fellow determined to find the truth for himself about conditions in the mines, runs away from home and adopts the alias "Joe Smith." After being turned away by one coal mine for fear of Hal being a union organizer, he gets a job in another coal mine operated by the General Fuel Company, or GFC. In the mines he befriends many of the workers, and realizes their misery and exploitation at the hands of the bosses.

He befriends Mary Burke, who is a passionate fighter for the workers' rights. Her father is a mine worker who spends his days drinking and leaving her to take care of her siblings. She and Hal grow close, which tears at Hal's loyalty to his fiancée back home.

After dedicating himself to the workers' cause, he tells them that he will appeal to the bosses to become a check weigh man who measures the amount of coal, but the GFC, wanting to cheat the workers out of their pay, appoints a company check weigh man. Hal is eventually put into the jail by the marshal, who is teased by Hal over conditions of the mines and accused by Hal of being corrupted and unfair to the workers.

After an explosion in the mines, Hal seeks out Percy Harrigan, an old friend whose father, Peter Harrigan, owns the General Fuel Company. The workers organize a strike and union to demand their rights from the bosses, but the rescue effort goes longer than expected. The bosses are more intent on the tools and equipment than the miners. "Damn the man! save the Mules!" says a boss.

Hal appeals to the United Mine Workers to back the strike, but they refuse, telling him that the strike is primitive and unexpected and that to support it when its just started to participate in action would waste the union's resources. Hal is told to wait a few more years for the other unions to strike, and only with a massive course of action could the unions win. Hal is left to tell the workers the grievous news but the workers nevertheless cheer out his name (some calling out Joe Smith and others Hal) for standing up for them.

After a confrontation with his brother Edward, Hal resolves to return home and dedicate his life to the workers' cause. Hal leaves and concludes that he is in love with Mary Burke.
