= Presidential Agent =

1944 novel by Upton Sinclair

- First edition
- Author: Upton Sinclair
- Language: English
- Series: Lanny Budd
- Genre: Historical
- Publisher: Viking Press
- Publication date: 1944
- Publication place: United States
- Media type: Print (Hardcover)
- Pages: 655 pp
- Preceded by: Wide Is the Gate
- Followed by: Dragon Harvest

Presidential Agent is the fifth novel in Upton Sinclair's Lanny Budd series. First published in 1944, the story covers the period from 1937 to 1938.

== Plot ==
Visiting New York in 1937 to see paintings for sale, Lanny runs into his old mentor from the Paris Peace Conference, Professor Alston, who is working in the Roosevelt administration. Upon hearing that Lanny's wealthy European customers include top Nazis Adolf Hitler, Hermann Göring, and Josef Goebbels, and that Lanny's father Robbie has started a military aircraft Company in Connecticut, but is finding only Nazi customers, Alston suggests a meeting with President Franklin D. Roosevelt. FDR is impressed with Lanny’s grasp of the situation in Europe. Lanny agrees to gather information in Europe as a confidential agent.

In Germany, Lanny’s old school friend Kurt is rising as a German agent. In England, schoolmate Rick is a leftist writer of political analysis. Lanny's American heiress ex-wife Irma is looking to marry into the English aristocracy. The English upper crust, including Lanny's ex-lover Rosemary (back from the Argentine, her husband's scandal having blown over), and the wealthy DeBruyne family of Lanny's deceased French ex-lover Marie, all fear a "Red" Spain and see Hitler as preferable to Stalin.

In Paris, Lanny finds his secret wife Trudi has vanished, as have others working in the anti-Nazi underground. He seeks help from his “Red” uncle Jesse. His Spanish friend Raoul may be able to reach Trudi’s old underground contact Monck, who is fighting against the fascists in the Spanish Civil War. Lanny believes Trudi may be imprisoned in the walled, guarded Chateau Belcour outside Paris. Lanny manages get himself, Monck and a locksmith into the chateau dungeons, where they find Trudi has already been taken to Germany.

Trying further to rescue Trudi, Lanny steps up his mingling in Nazi society as an art dealer and by posing as a convert to Nazism. Hitler purchases Detaze paintings and asks Lanny to spy on wealthy Austrians in Vienna. Lanny learns Hitler is preparing to force the Anschluss; he notifies FDR. By a device involving an occult séance, Lanny maneuvers Nazi Rudolf Hess to reveal that Trudi died at Dachau Concentration Camp.

Lanny again reports to FDR on Nazi terrorism and aims of domination. In New York City, Lanny witnesses a fascist rally of the Christian Front (United States). Back home on the Riviera, Lanny discovers that his sister Marceline's husband, the Italian fascist officer Vittorio, has stolen Marcel Detaze paintings from the home of Lanny's mother Beauty; Lanny allows Vittorio to avoid arrest by leaving France permanently. Shortly thereafter, a pregnant waitress threatens to sue Vittorio for child support; upon learning of the affair, Marceline divorces Vittorio. Marceline becomes a professional dancer.

Back in Germany, Lanny sees Czechoslovakia partially dismembered "in the name of peace" at the 1938 Munich Conference. The Kristallnacht pogrom erupts all over Germany. Discouraged by the failure of England and France to arm themselves against Hitler and the political difficulties preventing FDR from acting, Lanny considers resigning as a Presidential Agent, but he stays on. Lanny sees the future holds a fateful struggle of Roosevelt against Hitler.

== Reissue ==
In 2001 the book was re-issued by Simon Publications in two volumes. Digital editions are available.
