= O Shepherd, Speak! =

1949 novel by Upton Sinclair

- First edition cover
- Author: Upton Sinclair
- Language: English
- Series: Lanny Budd
- Genre: Historical
- Publisher: Viking Press
- Publication date: 1949
- Publication place: United States
- Media type: Print (Hardcover)
- Pages: 629 pp
- ISBN: 978-1-931313-10-0
- OCLC: 47748926
- Preceded by: One Clear Call
- Followed by: The Return of Lanny Budd

O Shepherd, Speak! is the tenth novel in Upton Sinclair's Lanny Budd series. First published in 1949, the story covers the period from 1944 to 1946.
