= World's End (Sinclair novel) =

1940 novel by Upton Sinclair

- First edition
- Author: Upton Sinclair
- Language: English
- Series: Lanny Budd
- Genre: Historical novel
- Publisher: Viking Press (US); T. Werner Laurie (UK)
- Publication date: 1940
- Publication place: United States
- Media type: Print (Hardcover and Paperback)
- Followed by: Between Two Worlds

World's End is the first novel of Upton Sinclair's Lanny Budd series. First published in 1940, after World War II had begun in Europe the previous year, the story covers the period from 1913 to 1919, before and after World War I.

== Plot summary ==
Thirteen-year-old Lanny Budd, spending the summer of 1913 at a Dalcroze Eurhythmics school near Dresden, vows lifelong friendship and dedication to art with fellow students Kurt Meissner, scion of a German ruling family in Silesia in Prussia; and Rick Pomeroy-Nielson, an English Viscount's son from Oxford. Author Upton Sinclair weaves Lanny and these two friends, and many other characters in this book, into the saga of the turbulent decades to follow in the eleven-volume Lanny Budd series.

Lanny was raised on the French Riviera by his mother, called Beauty. His father, Robbie, visits regularly from Connecticut while selling arms manufactured by the family-owned Budd Gunmakers. Robbie never married Beauty, but he set up a perpetual trust for Beauty and Lanny to live in a seafront villa at Juan-les-Pins, near Cannes. Lanny, without formal schooling, has grown up with languages, music, and the society of Beauty's wealthy, connected friends. Robbie teaches Lanny history and diplomacy needed for a Budd to sell arms to European powers. Basil Zaharoff, a brilliant and dangerous competitor, runs arms giant Vickers and plots to absorb Budd.

Perplexing incidents intrude on young Lanny's idyllic life. Robbie erupts when he learns Beauty's "Red" brother Jesse introduced Lanny to followers of syndicalism. On the train home from a picture-postcard Christmas at Kurt's family schloss, a Social Democrat says commoners in Silesia are basically slaves; and Lanny should avoid being alone with certain Prussian aristocrats, including Kurt's father. Also on the train, Lanny meets the charming Johannes Robin, a Jewish jobber from Rotterdam; Lanny wonders why Jews have been absent from his life. Back in France, a Russian baron whom Lanny trusted lures and assaults the handsome boy. Beauty, faced with Lanny's new questions about life, hires a psychiatrist and a tutor for him. Lanny absorbs the new knowledge and realizes that a painter friend, Marcel Detaze, is Beauty's lover.

Lanny, Rick and Kurt meet in London to see plays and operas. A few blocks from Beauty's posh hotel, Lanny is mugged in a piteous slum. Seated near the Royal Box at Ascot Racecourse, Lanny asks Rick if the King is aware of poverty. Rick suggests education will cure poverty. Kurt says poverty is not permitted in Germany. The boys discuss sex. Kurt says the peasant girls are always available, but he seeks one true love. Rick says his sister's suffragette friends disdain that sentiment, and are using birth control. Lanny tells of his escape from the Russian baron. Rick says puritanism leads to homosexuality in the English schools; Kurt says it's a problem in the German army. News arrives that Archduke Franz Ferdinand of Austria has been assassinated in Sarajevo. The friends agree such matters are irrelevant to their pursuit of art, but a message directs Kurt to return home immediately. Before leaving England, Lanny falls in love with Rosemary, a beautiful English aristocrat.

Lanny and Beauty meet Robbie in Paris as war breaks out. Marcel has joined the French army. Lanny helps transcribe new orders into Budd code for cabling. Rick becomes a fighter pilot for England; Kurt joins the German Army. Marcel is horribly wounded but survives to marry Beauty. To Beauty's dismay, Marcel re-enlists and is not heard from again. Robbie is neutral on the war; he says the real point of the war is oil. Jesse agrees.

America enters the war and contracts for all Budd output. Robbie takes Lanny to Connecticut to meet the Puritan Budd family and learn the arms business. The Germans agree to an armistice when they lose access to their sources of oil. Robbie takes Lanny back to Europe as regional wars erupt. On the ship, Professor Alston, an expert for U.S. President Woodrow Wilson, offers Lanny a job at the Paris Peace Conference. In Paris, Joannes Robin plans to sell war surplus; Robbie invests even though it is a "Jewish" business. The French continue the Blockade of Germany, which starves civilians and boosts the Bolshevik influence in Bavaria and Berlin. Rick is shot down and loses use of his leg. Rosemary writes that she still loves Lanny but must marry an English earl.

The Peace Conference, increasingly controlled by British and French industrialists, turns ever more punitive against Germany. Kurt works underground in Paris to turn French opinion against the blockade. Wilson's health drains as his liberal policies are ignored at the Conference, and at home, Americans reject the League of Nations. Poland is carved from German lands as a French client state; the Ottoman Empire is dismembered by Britain and France. Kurt's spy cell is raided; he lives with Beauty while continuing his work, disguised as a Swiss musician. Beauty and Kurt become lovers; as the French police close in, they escape to Spain. Alston, Lanny and others resign in protest from the failed Conference. French police catch Lanny with incriminating leaflets; they hold him in a filthy, windowless dungeon. Uncle Jessie secures his release. Jesse tells Robbie capitalism makes the next war inevitable. Robbie says he will fight the Reds with his own machine guns. Lanny realizes his youthful faith in peace, reason and beauty—that world has ended. He heads home to the villa at Juan.
