= Edward Earle Purinton =

American businessman

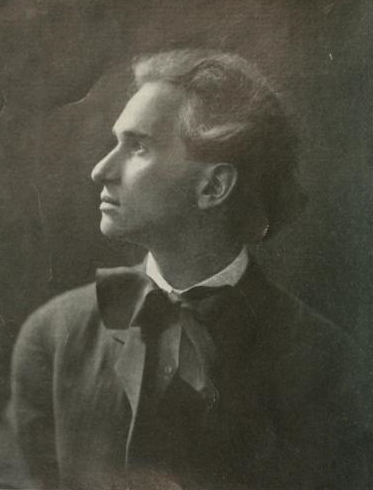
- Born: April 24, 1878; Morgantown, West Virginia
- Died: July 10, 1943; Chattahoochee, Florida
- Occupations: Businessman, writer

Edward Earle Purinton (April 24, 1878 – July 10, 1943) was an American businessman, naturopath, philosopher and self-help writer.

== Biography ==
Purinton was born in Morgantown, West Virginia. He obtained his Bachelor of Arts from Denison University in June 1899 and was an instructor in Greek at the Doane Academy (1899–1900). His father was Daniel Boardman Purinton, a former President of Denison University.

Purinton wrote articles on business and personal efficiency for The Independent magazine. He was Director of The Independent's Efficiency Service. Purinton was dean of the American Efficiency Foundation and wrote about the virtues of American business practices. He was a member of the American Academy of Political and Social Science and President of the National Efficiency League of New York City.

Purinton was a naturopath. In 1902, Purinton edited Benedict Lust's The Naturopath and Herald of Health. He was a notable advocate of fasting, authoring The Philosophy of Fasting in 1915. He labelled his system of fasting the "Conquest Fast" and described it as "a combination of the early Church Fast with the modern Therapeutic Fast." His views on fasting influenced Wincenty Lutosławski. Purinton recommended fasting for spiritual well-being and virtue.

Purinton died at Chattahoochee, Florida.

== Selected publications ==
- The Soul in Silhouette (1904)
- The Philosophy of Fasting (1906)
- Efficient Living (1915)
- The Triumph of the Man Who Acts (1916)
- Personal Efficiency in Business (1920)
