= Mary Craig Sinclair =

American writer and political activist

Mary Craig Kimbrough Sinclair
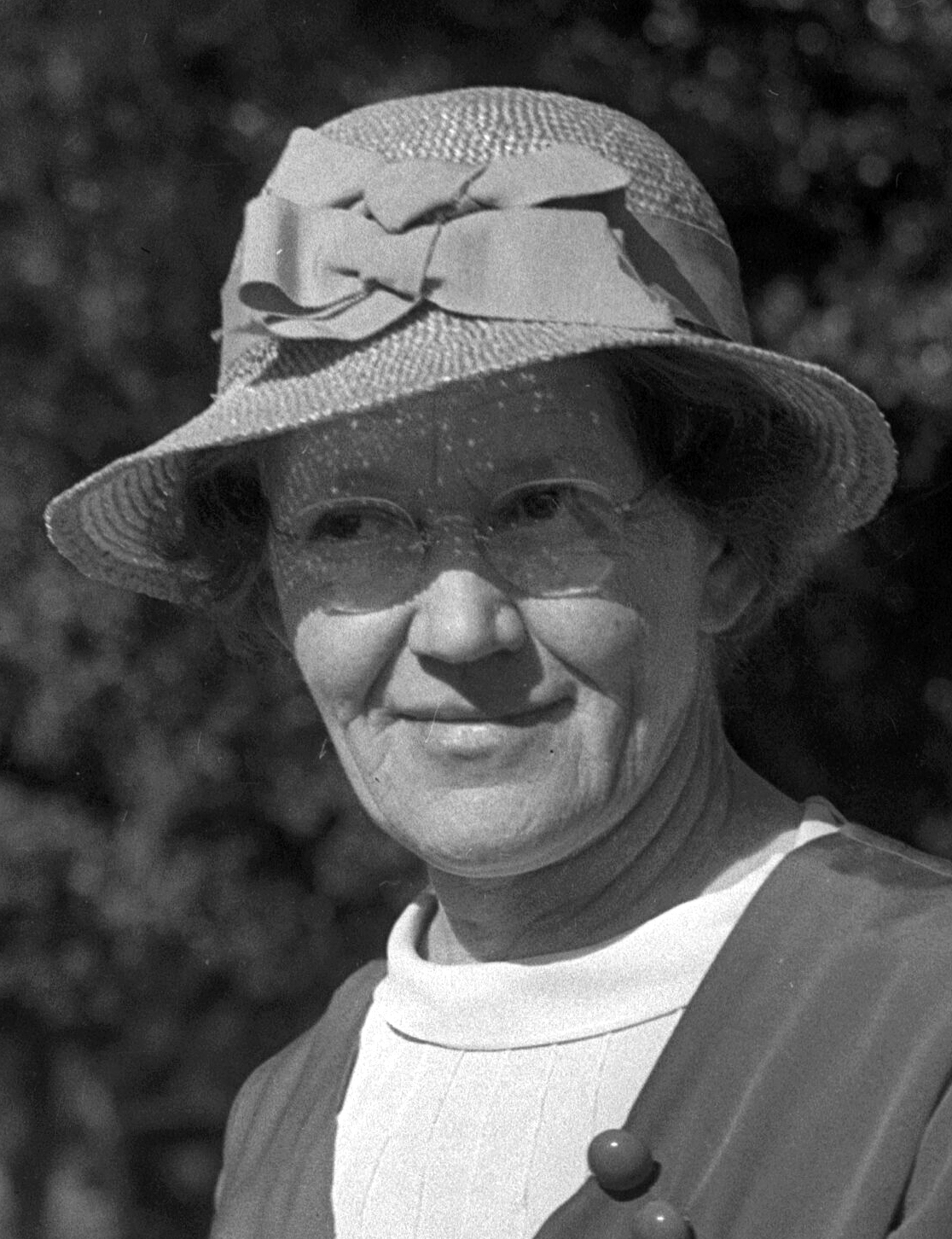
- Sinclair in 1935
- Born: February 12, 1882; Greenwood, Mississippi
- Died: April 26, 1961 (aged 79); Pasadena, California
- Resting place: IOOF (Odd Fellows) Cemetery, Greenwood, Mississippi
- Education: Mississippi State College for Women, Columbus; Gardner School for Young Ladies, New York
- Occupations: Novelist, journalist, political activist, publisher, motion picture producer
- Spouse: Upton Sinclair (m. 1913; death 1961)
- Writing career
- Movement: Socialism

Mary Craig Sinclair (1882–1961) was a writer, publisher, motion picture producer, and political activist. She was the wife of Upton Sinclair.

== Early life and education ==
She was born Mary Craig Kimbrough in Greenwood, Mississippi, on February 12, 1882, the oldest child of Mary Hunter (née Southworth) and Allan McCaskill Kimbrough, a judge. Her father was a wealthy attorney with banking interests, and a member of one of the oldest elite Mississippi families. Beginning at age 13, Mary studied at the Mississippi State College for Women (starting with what were essentially high school classes) and graduated from the Gardner School for Young Ladies in New York City in 1900.

== Career ==
Kimbrough (called "Craig" in many accounts) began writing and contributed regularly to newspapers and magazines.

On a trip with her mother to the Battle Creek Sanitarium, they attended a lecture by best-selling author Upton Sinclair and met him afterwards. Kimbrough talked with Sinclair about her writing and he began to teach her, developing a deepening relationship even though he was married.

At the age of twenty-five, to sell her uncompleted biography of Winnie Davis (the daughter of Jefferson Davis) Kimbrough traveled to New York City. There she met the poet George Sterling, who was visiting from his home in California. Sterling was married, but he immediately declared his love for Kimbrough. She told him, "I cannot love you." He responded that he would write a poem a day and send it to her, which he did, along with impassioned letters.

Sterling and Sinclair had been friends for years. Now they competed for Kimbrough's affections. She chose Sinclair. All three remained close friends until Sterling's death in 1926. Sterling taught Mary Craig Sinclair how to write poetry.

At the time of the Kimbrough-Sinclair marriage on April 21, 1913, the New York Times reported that Mary Craig Kimbrough was best known in the South for The Romance History of Winnie Davis, her biography of Winnie Davis, the daughter of Jefferson Davis. But in her autobiography, Craig said she never wanted to publish it because she found that "emotionalism and sentimentality among Confederate veterans made writing an objective study impossible." As she recalled, her future husband said, "Your book is terrible! You can't write. I can't honestly encourage you."

According to Craig, at her insistence Upton Sinclair published Sylvia (1913) under his name. Craig said that she wrote the novel about a Southern girl based on her own experiences. In her 1957 memoir, she described how she and her husband had collaborated on the work:

Upton and I struggled through several chapters of Sylvia together, disagreeing about something on every page. But now and then each of us admitted that the other had improved something. I was learning fast now that this novelist was not much of a psychologist. He thought of characters in a book merely as vehicles for carrying his ideas.

Once married, she said they collaborated on a sequel, Sylvia's Marriage (1914), which was also published under Upton Sinclair's name, by John C. Winston Company, Philadelphia.

The writers disagreed about authorship. In his 1962 autobiography, Upton Sinclair wrote: "[Mary] Craig had written some tales of her Southern girlhood; and I had stolen them from her for a novel to be called Sylvia."

== Marriage ==
Kimbrough married Upton Sinclair on April 12, 1913. At the time her friends said she did not share her new husband's "liberal ideas on matrimony." He had once said that marriage is "nothing but legalized slavery...for the average married woman."

Her husband, Upton Sinclair, credited her with helping him to "write and publish three million books and pamphlets, flowing into every country in the world." In his autobiography, he portrayed Mary Sinclair as someone "who may not always have believed in what her husband was doing but cheerfully helped him do it."

== Mental telepathy ==
Upton Sinclair's Mental Radio (1930) reported that Mary had telepathic powers. He included her testimony describing her technique and her assertion that others could acquire the same ability. Mary attempted to duplicate 290 pictures which were drawn by her brother. Sinclair claimed Mary successfully duplicated 65 of them, with 155 "partial successes" and 70 failures. The book was criticized by science writer Martin Gardner who wrote "As Mental Radio stands, it is a highly unsatisfactory account of conditions surrounding the clairvoyance tests. Throughout his entire life, Sinclair has been a gullible victim of mediums and psychics." The experiment was not done in scientifically controlled conditions and the possibility of sensory leakage had not been ruled out.

== Works and critical responses ==
=== Author ===
- The Romance History of Winnie Davis (unpublished)
- uncredited co-author with Upton Sinclair, Sylvia: A Novel (Pasadena: Upton Sinclair, 1913)
- uncredited co-author with Upton Sinclair, Sylvia’s Marriage: A Novel (Philadelphia: John C. Winston, 1914)
- Sonnets (Pasadena: Upton Sinclair, [1925])
- Southern Belle: A Personal Story of a Crusader’s Wife (New York: Crown, 1957); reprinted (Phoenix: Sinclair Press, 1962); reprinted (Jackson: University Press of Mississippi, 1999)

The New York Times called Sylvia "..the best novel Mr. Sinclair has yet written–so much the best that it stands in a class by itself."

According to one reviewer, in Southern Belle Sinclair reports on her early life with "sentimentality...that does no real harm. Indeed, it is rather touching." "Mrs. Sinclair," it said, "has produced a book interesting enough to suggest that she and Upton Sinclair learned from each other and significant enough to be worth attention." Another said her book told "a truly romantic as well as wonderfully goofy story" that would prove "irresistible to students of U.S. life and manners."

=== Editor and publisher ===
- Kate Crane-Gartz, Off to the Antipodes (n. p.: Mary Craig Sinclair, 1900)
- Kate Crane-Gartz, The Parlor Provocateur: From Salon to Soap-Box (Pasadena: Mary Craig Sinclair, 1923)
- Kate Crane-Gartz, The Letters of Kate Crane-Gartz (Pasadena: Mary Craig Sinclair, 1923)
- Kate Crane-Gartz, Letters of Protest (Pasadena: Mary Craig Sinclair, 1925)
- Kate Crane-Gartz, A Woman and War (Long Beach: Mary Craig Sinclair, 1928)
- Kate Crane-Gartz, Travel Diary: 1929 (Pasadena: Mary Craig Sinclair, first edition n.d.; second edition 1939)
- Kate Crane-Gartz, Still More Letters (Pasadena: Mary Craig Sinclair, [1931?])
- Kate Crane-Gartz, Seventh Book (Pasadena: Mary Craig Sinclair, 1932)
- Kate Crane-Gartz, European Impressions: 1936 (n. p.: Mary C. Sinclair, 1936)
- Kate Crane-Gartz, Prophetic Letters v. 4 (Pasadena: Mary Craig Sinclair, [1937])

=== Motion picture producer ===
- ¡Que Viva México! (1932)
- Thunder Over Mexico (1933)
- Eisenstein in Mexico (1933)
- Death Day [short subject] (1934)
- Time in the Sun (1940)
- Que Viva Mexico (1979)

== Death ==
Sinclair had become extremely frail by the mid-1950s, and died of a stroke in Pasadena, California, on April 26, 1961, at the age of 78.

== Honors ==
Three 1928 editions of Sonnets to Craig by George Sterling, center paperback and two hardcovers.

* The poet George Sterling addressed his Sonnets to Craig (1928) to her.
