= Mental Radio =

1930 book by Upton Sinclair

- First edition (self-published)
- Author: Upton Sinclair
- Language: English
- Subject: Telepathy
- Published: 1930
- Publication place: United States
- Media type: Print
- OCLC: 2012635

Mental Radio: Does it work, and how? (1930) is a book by American author Upton Sinclair, self-published initially. The book documents Sinclair's tests of his second wife, Mary Craig Sinclair's psychic abilities during a period of depression and interest in the occult. Mary attempted to replicate 290 drawings made by her brother, with Sinclair claiming she successfully duplicated 65, had 155 "partial successes", and 70 failures. The experiments lacked a controlled scientific environment.

The German edition of the book included a preface by Albert Einstein, who praised Sinclair's writing. In 1932, psychical researcher Walter Franklin Prince conducted an analysis of the results and believed that telepathy had been demonstrated in Sinclair's data. Prince's analysis was published as "The Sinclair Experiments for Telepathy" in Part I of Bulletin XVI of the Boston Society for Psychical Research in April 1932 and included in the book's addendum.

== Critical reception ==
Sinclair has been criticized for his "credulous" belief in occult and pseudoscience topics. Martin Gardner wrote "As Mental Radio stands, it is a highly unsatisfactory account of conditions surrounding the clairvoyancy tests. Throughout his entire life, Sinclair has been a gullible victim of mediums and psychics." Gardner also pointed out that the possibility of sensory leakage during experiments had not been ruled out:

In the first place, an intuitive wife, who knows her husband intimately, may be able to guess with a fair degree of accuracy what he is likely to draw—particularly if the picture is related to some freshly recalled event the two experienced in common. At first, simple pictures like chairs and tables would likely predominate, but as these are exhausted, the field of choice narrows and pictures are more likely to be suggested by recent experiences. It is also possible that Sinclair may have given conversational hints during some of the tests—hints which in his strong will to believe, he would promptly forget about. Also, one must not rule out the possibility that in many tests, made across the width of a room, Mrs. Sinclair may have seen the wiggling of the top of a pencil, or arm movements, which would convey to her unconscious a rough notion of the drawing.

When Mrs. Sinclair was tested by William McDougall under different conditions, the results were unsatisfactory.
