= One Clear Call =

1948 novel by Upton Sinclair

Once Clear Call
- First edition
- Author: Upton Sinclair
- Language: English
- Series: Lanny Budd
- Genre: Historical novel
- Publisher: Viking Press
- Publication date: 1948
- Publication place: United States
- Media type: Print (Hardcover)
- Pages: 629 pp
- Preceded by: Presidential Mission
- Followed by: O Shepherd, Speak!

One Clear Call is the ninth novel in Upton Sinclair's Lanny Budd series. First published in 1948, the story covers the period from 1943 to 1944.
