= Dragon's Teeth (novel) =

1942 novel by Upton Sinclair

- First edition cover
- Author: Upton Sinclair
- Language: English
- Series: Lanny Budd
- Genre: Historical fiction
- Publisher: Viking Press
- Publication date: 1942
- Publication place: United States
- Media type: Print (hardcover)
- Pages: 631 pp
- Preceded by: Between Two Worlds
- Followed by: Wide is the Gate

Dragon's Teeth is a 1942 novel by Upton Sinclair that won the Pulitzer Prize for the Novel in 1943. Set in the period 1929 to 1934, it covers the Nazi takeover of Germany during the 1930s.

== Description ==
It is the third of Upton Sinclair's World's End series of eleven novels about Lanny Budd, a socialist, art expert, and "Red" grandson of an American arms manufacturer.

The Pulitzer Prize-winning novel by a great American writer portrays the men and women caught in an onslaught of terror, a holocaust from which few escape.

Lanny Budd became involved in what the Nazis termed "politics." He saw it as a question of human decency—that was how he found himself the prey in a manhunt as horrifying as it was deadly. Lanny Budd was one of those millions engulfed in the century's tragedy, trapped by the rising monster of Nazi Germany.

— Back of the 1968 edition

Mr. Sinclair rises to the full fictional possibilities of his material ... a sincere and brave performance.

— The Times

Few works of fiction are more fun to read; fewer still make history half as clear, or as human.

— Time

Sinclair's finest.

— The New York Times

== Plot ==
In the first volume of the series, Lanny Budd had met a family of Dutch Jews. By the time the events of this book occur, his half-sister has married one of their sons.

In the climax at the end of this volume, Lanny helps spring the other son from Nazi arrest and jail, and gets caught up in the Blood Purge from June 30 to July 2, 1934 in Germany.

The novel begins with Lanny Budd in the delivery waiting room in a very expensive hospital in England, while his wife, Irma Barnes, is giving birth to their baby girl. The first couple hundred pages of the book reveal details about Lanny Budd and his family and associates. Irma is a wealthy heiress; Lanny's father owns a gun company named Budd Gunmakers. Lanny's half-sister Bess is married to Hansi, a renowned Jewish musician. Bess is a supportive wife who is said to not even allow Hansi to carry his own violin case because his fingers should only be used as a medium to express his beautiful feelings and passion to millions of people. Hansi is humble and plays for the workers at a very low price and sometimes free.

The stock market crashes while Lanny and his friends are on a cruise on the private yacht of Hansi's family. The Jewish family was on their way to pick up their acquaintances at a port and The Budds and friends sit nervously as the yacht fails to return on schedule. The young prosperous Jewish family was captured by the Nazis and the family was split up and put into jails and concentration camps. Johannas, the father of the Jewish family, was retrieved by him giving every last cent of his to the Nazi party. Lanny had to influence to make this happen because he is falsely close with higher ups in the Nazi party and even met Hitler a couple of times over tea. However the rest of the novel is the struggle of getting the last person of the family out of Germany. Although it was arranged that Lanny would pay 30,000 notes for his friend to be dropped off near the border of Germany and allowed to exit the country, SS officers waiting at the location kill Lanny's friend and arrest Lanny. After several days he is dragged into the torture and execution room, where he witnesses the torture of an owner of one of the biggest banks in the world. Strangely he is rescued right before his turn is up. He is brought into an office of one of the greats of the Nazi party that he has met before and is very intimidating especially because of his pet tiger cub. The higher up offers the release of the prisoner if he pays him off and if he goes to the family of the banker and tells them what he saw and gets the account numbers and passwords so they can bleed him dry. If Lanny follows through he will save two lives. Lanny saves his friend and his friend is operated on by one of the greatest doctors in the world to restore him back to perfect health with the help of his wife.
