= Oil! =

1926–27 American novel by Upton Sinclair

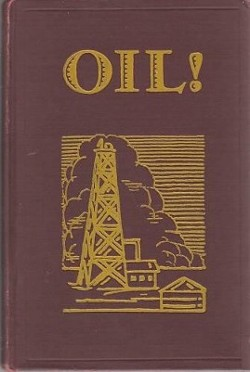
- First edition
- Author: Upton Sinclair
- Language: English
- Genre: Political
- Publisher: Albert & Charles Boni
- Publication date: 1926–27
- Publication place: United States
- Media type: Hardback (print)
- Pages: 528
- OCLC: 463840244

Scan of the 1927 first edition

Oil! is an American novel by Upton Sinclair, first published in 1926–27 and told as a third-person narrative, with only the opening pages written in the first person. The book was written in the context of the Harding administration's Teapot Dome scandal and takes place in Southern California. It is a social and political satire skewering the human foibles of all its characters.

The main character is James Arnold Ross Jr., nicknamed Bunny, son of an oil tycoon. Bunny's sympathetic feelings toward oilfield workers and socialists provoke arguments with his father throughout the story. The beginning of the novel served as a loose inspiration for Paul Thomas Anderson's 2007 film There Will Be Blood.

== Characters ==
- James Arnold Ross (a.k.a. Dad), a self-made oil millionaire
- James Arnold "Bunny" Ross Jr., the protagonist; the only son of a self-made oil millionaire
- Paul Watkins, a farmer's son who runs away from home, is tutored by a free thinker, and becomes an advocate for the rights of laborers. After spending time in Siberia after World War I, he sympathizes with Bolshevism and becomes a communist.
- Vernon Roscoe, Dad's business partner, and arguably the novel's antagonist. He is a greedy businessman who helps bribe the government to acquire the land in Teapot Dome to drill oil. He also works to crush the unions that oppose him by bribing the authorities to throw its members into jail.
- Alberta "Bertie" Ross, Bunny's older sister and an aspiring socialite.
- Aunt Emma, Bunny's aunt, widow of J. Arnold Ross' brother. She lives with the family.
- Ruth Watkins, Paul's younger sister, who is Bunny's age.
- Eli Watkins, Paul's brother, who becomes an evangelical preacher.

== Synopsis ==
James Arnold "Dad" Ross and his son, James Jr. ("Bunny") are introduced as they drive through southern California to meet with the Watkins family, who are leasing out some oil property they own. They find out that the family is deadlocked about how the properties run and proceeds should be divided. While Dad and Bunny go quail hunting on the Watkins' goat ranch, they find oil. At Bunny's urging, Dad tries to prevent the elder Watkins from beating his daughter Ruth, trying to convince them that he has received a "third revelation" which prohibits parents from beating their children. The plan backfires when Eli, Ruth's brother, interjects himself into the discussion and claims that he has received the revelation.

As drilling begins at the Watkins ranch, Bunny begins to realize that his father's business methods are not entirely ethical. After a worker is killed in an accident and an oil well is destroyed in a blowout, Dad's workforce goes on strike. Bunny is torn between loyalty to Dad and his friendship to Ruth and her rebellious brother Paul, who support the workers. Paul is drafted into World War I and, when the conflict is over, remains in Siberia to fight the rising Bolsheviks. Back home, Bunny enrolls in college, and he becomes increasingly involved with socialism through a classmate, Rachel Menzies. Paul returns home and tells of his travels, explaining he has become a communist.

Bunny accompanies Dad to the seaside mansion of his business associate Vernon Roscoe. Dad and Roscoe flee the country to avoid being subpoenaed by Congress in the Teapot Dome scandal. Before Dad goes away, Bunny proposes parting ways with his father and earning his own way in the world; Dad is confused and hurt, but not unsupportive. Overseas, Dad meets and marries Mrs. Olivier, a widow and spiritualist, but soon passes away from pneumonia. Bunny decides to dedicate his life and inheritance to social justice while Roscoe moves to get control of the bulk of Dad's estate. Bunny and his sister Bertie are swindled out of most of their inheritance by Roscoe and Mrs. Olivier.

Bunny marries Rachel and they dedicate themselves to establishing a socialist institution of learning; Eli, by now a successful evangelist, falsely claims that Paul underwent a deathbed conversion to Christianity.

== Basis ==
The book is loosely based on the life of Edward L. Doheny (and the company he co-founded, Pan American Petroleum & Transport Company, the California assets of which became Pan American Western Petroleum Company), and also the strategic alliance Union-Independent Producers Agency, a consortium created in 1910 to bring oil via pipeline from Kern County to the Pacific Coast facilities of Union Oil Company at Port Harford (now called Port San Luis just west of Avila Beach).

Numerous parallels exist between the opening setting of the novel, Beach City, and the city of Huntington Beach. Huntington Beach was originally called "Pacific City", for which Beach City is a play off of both names. The novel states that the area had street names like "Telegraph" and "Beach City Blvd". Telegraph Road would be the last street crossed before getting off the highway onto Beach Blvd in the town of Buena Park to travel south to Huntington Beach. James Arnold Ross and Bunny stay in a hotel at the intersection of Beach City Blvd and Coast Drive, similar to Beach Blvd and what would later develop into Pacific Coast Highway, where a hotel and water resort once resided in the early 1900s. In the novel, Beach City is covered in beet and cabbage fields. Huntington Beach historically was covered in beet and celery fields. In the novel, the primary oil field found is on "Prospect Hill". The first confirmed oil wells in Huntington Beach were located on a series of bluffs.

The character of Eli Watkins is loosely based on the famous evangelist Aimee Semple McPherson.

== Fig-leaf edition ==
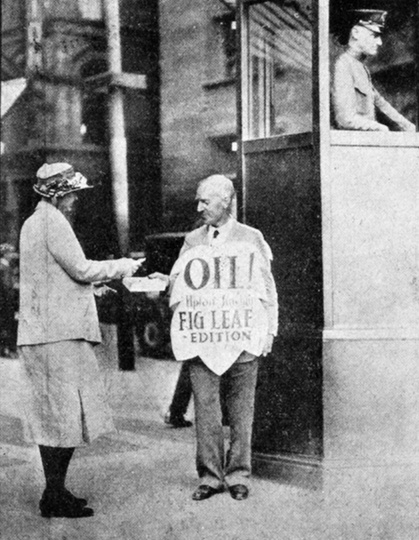
Upton Sinclair selling the "Fig Leaf Edition" of Oil! in Boston

Oil! was banned in Boston for its motel sex scene. Sinclair's publisher printed 150 copies of a "fig-leaf edition" with the offending nine pages blacked out. Sinclair protested the banning and hoped to bring an obscenity case to trial. He did not do so, but the controversy helped make the book a bestseller.

== Adaptations ==
The 2007 feature film There Will Be Blood, directed by Paul Thomas Anderson, is inspired by the novel, but the story is too different to be considered an adaptation. Unlike the novel, There Will Be Blood focused on the father, with his son being a supporting character. Paul Thomas Anderson said that he incorporated only the first 150 pages of the book into his film, so the rest of the film and novel are nearly entirely different.

Anderson based his composite lead character Daniel Plainview on Edward L. Doheny and several other men. He was inspired by the oil museums in Kern County, California, and the libraries and museums in the area around Silver City, New Mexico, as well as the period photography, which played a large part in shaping his screenplay and the film.
