= The Coal War =

1976 novel by Upton Sinclair

First edition (publ. University Press of Colorado)

The Coal War is a novel by Upton Sinclair. It is a sequel to King Coal and documents the continuing exploits of that novel's protagonist, Hal Warner. When Sinclair submitted the novel for publication in 1917, it was rejected as being insufficiently interesting from a novelistic standpoint. After this, the manuscript remained in limbo until 1976, when it was finally published by the Colorado Associated University Press. The book was published eight years after Sinclair's death.
