= Wide Is the Gate =

1943 novel by Upton Sinclair

- First edition
- Author: Upton Sinclair
- Language: English
- Series: Lanny Budd
- Genre: Historical fiction
- Publisher: Viking Press
- Publication date: 1943
- Publication place: United States
- Media type: Print (Hardcover)
- Pages: 751 pp
- Preceded by: Dragon's Teeth
- Followed by: The Presidential Agent

Wide Is the Gate is the fourth novel in Upton Sinclair's Lanny Budd series. First published in 1943, the story covers the period from 1934 to 1938.

== Plot ==
In this novel Lanny Budd's marriage to Irma breaks down after he imposes on her to help smuggle a revolutionary named Trudy out of Germany. Her husband Ludi had been arrested and vanished into the Gestapo prison system. Months later Lanny, at a séance, hears that Ludi is dead. He persuades Trudy that Ludi is dead and they secretly marry.

Meanwhile, Lanny gets interested in Spain, and is in Barcelona for the Socialist People's Olympiad, in competition to the Berlin games. The Spanish Civil War breaks out. The son of Lanny's English friend Rick enlists in the Republican cause. In the climax at the end of the novel the son has been captured by the Nationalists and Lanny undertakes a dangerous attempt to spring the son from captivity and send him home to England.
