= Presidential Mission =

1947 novel by Upton Sinclair

A Presidential Mission
- First edition
- Author: Upton Sinclair
- Language: English
- Series: Lanny Budd
- Genre: Historical
- Publisher: Viking Press
- Publication date: 1947
- Publication place: United States
- Media type: Print (Hardcover)
- Pages: 645 pp
- ISBN: 9789997531698
- OCLC: 743064
- Preceded by: A World to Win
- Followed by: One Clear Call

Presidential Mission is the eighth novel in Upton Sinclair's Lanny Budd series. First published by Viking Press in 1947, the story covers the period from 1942 to 1943.
