= The Journal of Arthur Stirling =

1903 novel by Upton Sinclair

- First UK edition
- Author: Upton Sinclair
- Language: English
- Genre: Drama/Journal
- Publisher: D. Appleton & Company (US); Heinemann (UK)
- Publication date: 1903
- Publication place: United States
- Media type: Print (hardcover)
- Pages: xiv+356

The Journal of Arthur Stirling is a novel by author Upton Sinclair, published in 1903. It is written in a first-person perspective, with the main fictional character being Arthur Stirling. Stirling, an unknown poet and writer, sets out to write his first poem, The Captive. He begins writing a journal to help him further his work as an artist—the novel being the journal. The novel begins with an introduction by a character who calls himself, "S."; Stirling already dead by suicide, sends S. a copy of the journal, as well as The Captive for him to read. S. explains the production of the novel in a sense of tribute to Stirling.

Sinclair planted an obituary for Stirling in The New York Times "to raise a sensation", but was widely criticized by journalists and editors for the hoax.

Upton Sinclair's original version is currently in the Public Domain.

== Reception ==
A reviewer in The Athenaeum wrote:

... if the young man really lived, and, above all, died, as described by this book, then the critic is to a great extent disarmed. ...
We have said, and, as we desire to be fair, we repeat, that the book is clever. But it is not original, and not particularly wholesome.
