= Dragon Harvest =

1945 novel by Upton Sinclair

- First UK edition
- Author: Upton Sinclair
- Language: English
- Series: Lanny Budd
- Genre: Historical novel
- Publisher: Viking Press (US); T. W. Laurie (UK)
- Publication date: 1945
- Publication place: United States
- Media type: Print (Hardcover)
- Pages: 703 pp
- OCLC: 743037
- Preceded by: The Presidential Agent
- Followed by: A World to Win

Dragon Harvest is the sixth novel in Upton Sinclair's Lanny Budd series. First published in 1945, the story covers the period from 1938 to 1940.

== Plot ==
Early 1939. Lanny Budd, dilettante art dealer and secret FDR agent, is home on the Riviera. Monck arrives on his way to rejoin the German underground. Barcelona has fallen and Madrid cannot hold. Partying among Cape society, has-been Winston Churchill rails against the Nazis and admits he was wrong on Spain; no one listens, except Lanny. Beauty receives a wealthy Baltimore family and their eligible daughter Lizbeth. Wall Street financiers now control Budd Gunmakers; Robbie is now selling Budd-Ehrling warplanes. Goring has bought some planes, but cheated on his deal; Robbie and Lanny, in Paris, navigate the minefield of French high politics, where rightists oppose arming as they want accord with Hitler.

In Berlin, Goring promises to investigate alleged patent and licensing violations. Lanny thinks about Laurel Creston, an antifascist American writer living in Berlin whom he met at an opening; Creston says Lanny is a political "troglodyte," but she suspects something about the handsome American. Robbie, seeking payback, sets Lanny to steal a model of Goring's new supercharger. Monck manages to pose as the unsuspecting Laurel's chauffeur; they drive a stolen supercharger device out of Naziland. Nazi troops occupy Prague. To Rick's disgust, Chamberlain stands down. Earl "Ceddy" Wickthorpe, husband of Lanny's ex-wife Irma and stepfather to Lanny's daughter, is starting to suspect Hitler; he agrees with Lanny that Hitler's cessions of certain Czech land to Hungary show accommodation to Stalin. The UK upper class still prefers Hitler over Stalin; Lanny advises FDR “that is the key to the understanding of all political events in Europe.”

FDR chafes under the U.S. Neutrality Acts. Lanny meets with Nazi sympathizers and art customers in Detroit including Henry Ford and Father Coughlin. Lizbeth and family buy an interest in Budd-Ehrling. Lizbeth is kind, beautiful and rich, but Lanny seeks a marriage of minds. Robbie and Lanny are summoned to D.C. by Professor Alston, who pretends he hasn't seen Lanny for twenty years. He tells Robbie all new warplanes must now be sold to the U.S. military, to be paid via the WPA, nominally a work-welfare agency. Robbie asks Lanny to explain to Goring, whose business Robbie may seek in the future. In Berlin, Monck warns of a Nazi-Stalin pact, and says Laurel is too openly anti-Nazi. Laurel calls, on the run from the Berlin Gestapo. Lanny drives her to the Berghof in Bavaria, where she poses as a psychic to the superstitious Nazis. She pulls it off and may actually have psychic ability. At a private seance, Hitler sexually assaults her. Lanny whisks her to safety in Switzerland, then meets the irresolute Daladier in Paris. In London, Chamberlain accepts the need to back Poland, but the democratic countries cannot nearly match Hitler's spending for arms. The Left is shocked by Stalin's pact. Rick wants to help the UK pro-war effort, but socialist writers are not trusted.

One million German soldiers invade Poland. FDR asks for intel on French and English reactions. American support for neutrality, long unshakeable, is now in turmoil; in England, Ceddy and Irma cease open support for Hitler. Irma asks why England is turning against the upper class; Lanny feigns bewilderment. Churchill is back in Admiralty. Rick's son Alfy is flying Spitfires. Ceddy confides that British intelligence has heard of a plan against Norway; suddenly Norway is occupied. Denmark is also taken, another easy Nazi victory. Churchill's star rises amidst division in England and France. Lanny sees folly; Rick sees poisonous capitalism. Monck says the invasion of France is imminent. Raoul arrives from the Pyrenees; 100,000 anti-Franco soldiers are being held in French concentration camps, but pro-Nazi ministers in the French cabinet block any action. Finally the dreaded blitzkrieg hits France: airfields are bombed, "merchant" ships docked in port spew Nazi troops who are directed by local spies; paratroopers land at key points. German tanks cut the French and British forces in two. Lanny's informally-adopted stepson Denis arrives from Sedan, wounded. He says his officers stood down to allow German "liberation" from France's own leftists. In Paris, Laval confides he will assist Petain with a new pro-German government. The French fascists encourage England to join in capitulation, but new Prime Minister Churchill puts the country on war alert as one million French and British troops retreat to the North Sea. Rick and Lanny sail in a convoy of hundreds of vessels of every description to Dunkirk, to rescue wading soldiers off the beach.

After six exhausting days and nights of rescue, Lanny climbs onto a makeshift pier and heads ashore, hoping to contact German soldiers. His plan is to reach Kurt, and Hitler, to learn Nazi intentions on invading England. He finds an abandoned apartment in Dunkirk, cleans up and puts on fresh clothes. Showing no fear and in crisp German, he heils advancing soldiers and manages to make his way to Kurt and Hitler, who says he will invade as soon as France is taken. Lanny reaches Paris ahead of the advancing armies as De Gaulle and Churchill in London endorse a union of the two countries in the hope of preventing a French capitulation, which fails. France is entirely defeated in a few weeks. At the Tomb of Napoleon, Lanny watches Hitler in deep contemplation and wonders when the world will be free of dictators.
