= The Fasting Cure =

1911 book by Upton Sinclair

- Title page of The Fasting Cure, first edition, 1911
- Author: Upton Sinclair
- Language: English
- Subject: Fasting
- Publisher: Mitchell Kennerley
- Publication date: 1911
- Publication place: United States
- Media type: Print
- Pages: 153 pp
- OCLC: 14778499
- LC Class: RM226 .S5 1911

Frontispiece of The Fasting Cure, first edition, 1911

The Fasting Cure is a 1911 nonfiction book on fasting by Upton Sinclair. It is a reprinting of two articles written by Sinclair which were originally published in the Cosmopolitan magazine. It also includes comments and notes to the articles, as well as extracts of articles Sinclair published in the Physical Culture magazine. The book is dedicated to Bernarr Macfadden.

Sinclair was keenly interested in health and nutrition. He experimented with various diets, and with fasting. He writes extensively about fasting in The Fasting Cure, which became a bestseller. Sinclair believed that periodic fasting was important for health, saying, "I had taken several fasts of ten or twelve days' duration, with the result of a complete making over of my health". Sinclair favored a raw food diet of predominantly vegetables and nuts. For long periods of time, he was a complete vegetarian, but he also experimented with eating meat. His attitude to these matters is fully explained in the book's final chapter, "The Use of Meat".

The book makes sensational claims of fasting curing practically all diseases, including cancer, tuberculosis, asthma, syphilis, and the common cold.

== Contemporary reception ==
The book was condemned in The Monthly Cyclopaedia and Medical Bulletin by gastroenterologist Anthony Bassler, who described treating many sickly patients who had followed the advice published in Sinclair's The Contemporary Review and Cosmopolitan Magazine articles. The accompanying article in Current Literature criticized Sinclair as a "faddist pure and simple, one whose mind is obsessed by a series of notions one after another, none resting upon any basis that can be called scientific or even sensible."

== Legacy ==
In his book Terrors of the Table: The Curious History of Nutrition (2005), British biophysicist Walter Gratzer describes Sinclair as "the most credulous of faddists." Gratzer also writes, "In what passes for a caveat he remarks [in his book The Book of Life (1921)]: 'I have known two or three cases of people dying while they were fasting, but I feel quite certain that the fast did not cause their death.' The irony in all this farrago is that we now have good evidence for an increased life-span in rodents kept in laboratory conditions on a very low-calorie diet." Likewise, in the book Quackery: A Brief History of the Worst Ways to Cure Everything (2017), authors Lydia Kang and Nate Pedersen write, "Although modern doctors would strongly disagree with Sinclair's unsolicited medical advice, there have been some recent promising studies on the impact of fasting on mice with cancer. Human studies, however, are still lacking."

== In popular culture ==
Sinclair appears in T. C. Boyle's novel The Road to Wellville (1993), which is built around a historical fictionalization of John Harvey Kellogg, the inventor of Corn Flakes and the founder of the Battle Creek Sanitarium. In the book, Sinclair and his first wife, Meta, appear as patients at the Sanitarium. Later, Kellogg is outraged when he discovers that another of his patients has been fasting after reading a typescript of Sinclair's The Fasting Cure.

American musician Jack White has cited The Fasting Cure as an inspiration; after reading it, he fasted for five days on water and coffee and wrote around 10 to 12 songs, some of which appear on his second album of 2022, Entering Heaven Alive.

== See also ==
- Water fasting
- Hereward Carrington § Dieting
- Edward H. Dewey
- Linda Hazzard
- Otto Buchinger
- Vrata
