= Between Two Worlds (novel) =

1941 novel by Upton Sinclair

- First edition
- Author: Upton Sinclair
- Language: English
- Series: Lanny Budd
- Genre: Historical novel
- Publisher: Viking Press
- Publication date: 1941
- Publication place: United States
- Media type: Print (Hardcover)
- Pages: 859 pp
- Preceded by: Worlds End
- Followed by: Dragon's Teeth

Between Two Worlds is the second novel in Upton Sinclair's Lanny Budd series. First published in 1941, the story covers the period from 1919 to 1929.

== Plot ==
This volume deals with the aftermath of World War I in Europe during the 1920s (with the Beer Hall Putsch, the Italian fascist regime and some of the important conferences) and later the Roaring Twenties.

After two disastrous affairs with married women Lanny marries in the end a rich heiress from New York, Irma. In the climax Lanny covers his father's stock market margin call on Black Thursday, Oct 24th 1929, then insists that his father sell all his stocks the next market day, thus escaping the carnage of Black Tuesday. His efforts to save his wife's wealth were not quite as successful, and her uncle was wiped out.
