= The Return of Lanny Budd =

1953 novel by Upton Sinclair

- First edition
- Author: Upton Sinclair
- Language: English
- Series: Lanny Budd
- Genre: Historical
- Publisher: Viking Press
- Publication date: 1953
- Publication place: United States
- Media type: Print (Hardcover)
- Pages: 555 pp
- Preceded by: O Shepherd, Speak!

The Return of Lanny Budd is the 11th and final novel in Upton Sinclair's Lanny Budd series. First published in 1953, the story covers the period from 1946 to 1949.
