= A World to Win (Sinclair novel) =

1946 novel by Upton Sinclair

- First edition
- Author: Upton Sinclair
- Language: English
- Series: Lanny Budd
- Genre: Historical
- Publisher: Viking Press
- Publication date: 1946
- Publication place: United States
- Media type: Print (Hardcover)
- Pages: 627 pp
- Preceded by: Dragon Harvest
- Followed by: Presidential Mission

A World to Win is the seventh novel in Upton Sinclair's Lanny Budd series. First published in 1946, the story covers the period from 1940 to 1942.

== Plot ==
In Vichy France, maintaining his cover as a dilettante sympathetic to the Nazis, Lanny insinuates himself among French pro-Nazis Philippe Pétain and Pierre Laval. Lanny urges Raoul that the French underground should support the capitalist English for now, and return to the class struggle after Hitler is defeated. Back on the Riviera, which is overrun by oblivious vacationers, Beauty wants Lanny to marry the heiress Lizbeth Holdenhurst; she suspects Lanny is in love with Lizbeth's poor cousin, the writer Laurel Creston.

Lanny travels to Spain to gather information on Franco and the Nazis' plans to take Gibraltar. Back in London under the bombing, Lanny updates Rick, who observes that the economic masters in all countries fund criminal thugs to eliminate dissent; Rick says England will fight to the end. Irma and Ceddy say the upper class want an accommodation, leaving Hitler to attack Russia. Rick's son Alfy is flying Spitfire planes defending London; the Budd fighter models have gone out of date, he says, and the outlook is uncertain. Lanny says improved Budd fighter planes will be arriving, if the RAF can hold out.

Lanny reports to FDR on the English and French collaborationists. In New York, he meets with Nazi operatives, who believe William Randolph Hearst may be willing to back a coup against FDR. Lanny thinks about Lizbeth and Laurel on his way to San Simeon, where he observes the degeneracy of Hollywood; Hearst is cautious. Back in D.C., Lanny helps FDR write his "Arsenal of Democracy" speech. FDR wants a report on Hitler's plans as to Russia. In Geneva, Monck says the invasion on a 1,100-mile front is imminent. Lanny asks Kurt and Rudolf Hess to get him an appointment with Hitler; meanwhile he goes to Toulon to learn more about the French fleet and to contact the underground. French resistance agents mistake Lanny for a Nazi spy and abduct him, but he buys his way out. In Germany Hitler confirms the plan to invade Russia; he claims Germany will leave the British Empire alone if England settles for peace. They discuss how Germany can support a coup against FDR. Meanwhile, Hess, tricked by English intelligence, flies to England to negotiate a peace; he is arrested.

Lizbeth's father becomes a major investor in Budd airplanes. Laurel is writing political fiction articles against the Nazis. Laurel suspects Lanny is doing undercover work but discreetly asks no questions. FDR assigns Lanny to contact an anti-Nazi physicist working on a German atomic bomb. Lanny prepares for this task with the help of Albert Einstein in Princeton. Lanny is badly injured when his plane from Newfoundland to England crashes in a violent storm. Rescuers discover Lanny is traveling on two passports; his cover is blown.

FDR furloughs Lanny, who needs months to recuperate. Lanny agrees to take a cruise to the South Seas and Hong Kong with Lizbeth and her family. On departing, he discovers that cousin Laurel is also on board. Lizbeth suffers a breakdown when she learns that Lanny and Laurel had known each other previously. In Hong Kong, war breaks out with Japan when the group is separated; Lanny and Laurel had been visiting the widow of Sun Yat-sen while Lizbeth and her father were at a British Officers' ball. Under bombing, Lanny and Laurel miss the hurried departure of the yacht. In a trance, Laurel channels Lizbeth, who says all were lost when a Japanese warship sunk the yacht. Lanny and Laurel marry, and make their way through China, where Lanny meets with Mao Zedong in his cave headquarters. The pair travel to Moscow, where Uncle Jesse helps Lanny meet with Stalin, who pledges to fight Hitler to the end.
