= Upton Sinclair =

American writer (1878–1968)

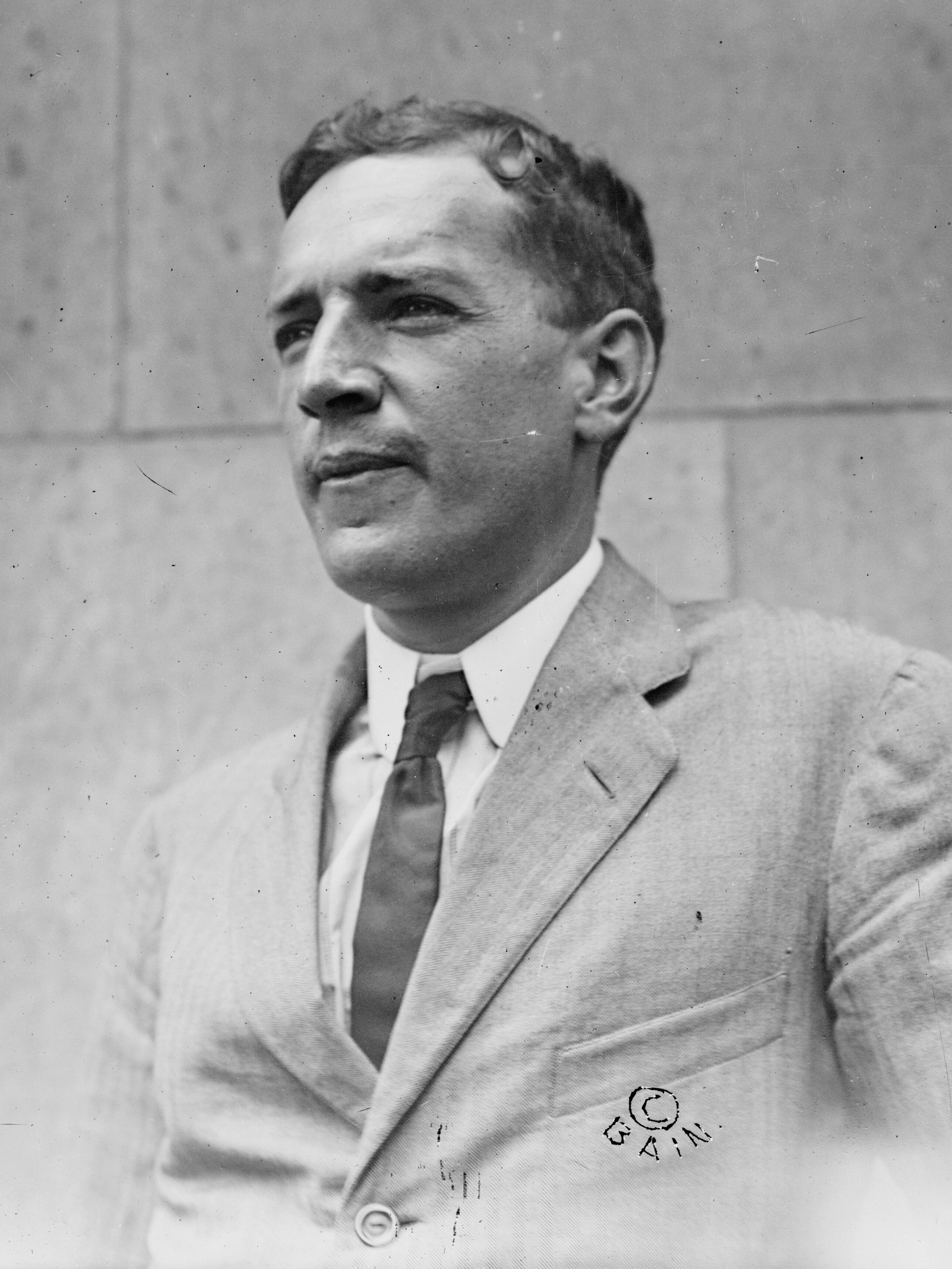
- Sinclair c. 1900
- Born: Upton Beall Sinclair Jr. September 20, 1878; Baltimore, Maryland, U.S.
- Died: November 25, 1968 (aged 90); Bound Brook, New Jersey, U.S.
- Resting place: Rock Creek Cemetery, Washington, D.C.
- Education: City College of New York (BA); Columbia University
- Occupations: Novelist; Writer; Journalist; Political Activist; Politician
- Notable work: The Jungle (1906); Oil! (1927)
- Political party: Socialist (1902–1934); Democratic (1934–1968)
- Spouses: Meta Fuller (m. 1900; div. 1911); Mary Craig Kimbrough (m. 1913; died 1961); Mary Elizabeth Willis (m. 1961; died 1967)
- Relatives: Arthur Sinclair (great-grandfather); Wallis Simpson (cousin); Corinne Mustin (cousin)

Upton Beall Sinclair Jr. (September 20, 1878 – November 25, 1968) was an American author, muckraker journalist, and political activist, and the 1934 Democratic Party nominee for governor of California. He wrote nearly 100 books and other works in several genres. Sinclair's work was well known and popular in the first half of the 20th century, and he won the 1943 Pulitzer Prize for Fiction.

In 1906, Sinclair acquired particular fame for his novel The Jungle, which "exposed the labor and sanitary conditions in the U.S. meatpacking industry", causing a public uproar that contributed in part to the enactment a few months later of the 1906 Pure Food and Drug Act and the Meat Inspection Act. In 1919, he published The Brass Check, a muckraking exposé of American journalism that publicized the issue of journalistic malpractice in the United States. Four years after publication of The Brass Check, the first code of ethics for journalists was created. Time magazine called him "a man with every gift except humor and silence" based on his wife Mary Craig Sinclair's book Southern Belle: A Personal Story of a Crusader's Wife. He is also well remembered for the quote "It is difficult to get a man to understand something, when his salary depends upon his not understanding it." He used this line in speeches and the book about his campaign for governor as a way to explain why the editors and publishers of the major newspapers in California would not treat seriously his proposals for old age pensions and other progressive reforms. Writing during the Progressive Era, Sinclair describes the world of the industrialized United States from both the working man's and the industrialist's points of view. Novels such as King Coal (1917), The Coal War (published posthumously), Oil! (1927), and The Flivver King (1937) describe the working conditions of the coal, oil, and auto industries at the time.

The Flivver King describes the rise of Henry Ford, his "wage reform" and his company's Sociological Department, to his decline into antisemitism as publisher of The Dearborn Independent. King Coal confronts John D. Rockefeller Jr., and his role in the 1914 Ludlow Massacre in the coal fields of Colorado.

Sinclair was an outspoken socialist and ran unsuccessfully for Congress as a nominee from the Socialist Party. He was also the Democratic Party candidate for governor of California during the Great Depression, running under the banner of the End Poverty in California campaign, but was defeated in the 1934 election.

== Early life and education ==
Sinclair was born in Baltimore, Maryland, to Upton Beall Sinclair Sr. and Priscilla Harden Sinclair. His father was a liquor salesman whose alcoholism shadowed his son's childhood. Priscilla Harden Sinclair was a strict Episcopalian who disliked alcohol, tea, and coffee. Both of Upton Sinclair's parents were of British ancestry. His paternal grandparents were Scottish, and all of his ancestors emigrated to America from Great Britain during the late 1600s and early 1700s. As a child, Sinclair slept either on sofas or cross-ways on his parents' bed. When his father was out for the night, he would sleep in the bed with his mother. His mother's family was very affluent: her parents were very prosperous in Baltimore, and her sister married a millionaire. Sinclair had wealthy maternal grandparents with whom he often stayed. This gave him insight into how both the rich and the poor lived during the late 19th century. Living in two social settings affected him and greatly influenced his books. Upton Beall Sinclair Sr. was from a highly respected family in the South, but the family was financially ruined by the Civil War, the end of slavery causing disruptions of the labor system during the Reconstruction era, and by an extended agricultural depression.

As he was growing up, Upton's family moved frequently, as his father was not successful in his career. He developed a love for reading when he was five years old. He read every book his mother owned for a deeper understanding of the world. He did not start school until he was 10 years old. He was deficient in math and worked hard to catch up quickly because of his embarrassment. In 1888, the Sinclair family moved to Queens, New York City, where his father sold shoes. Upton entered the City College of New York five days before his 14th birthday, on September 15, 1892. He wrote jokes, dime novels, and magazine articles in boys' weekly and pulp magazines to pay for his tuition. With that income, he was able to move his parents to an apartment when he was seventeen years old.

He graduated from City College in June 1897. He subsequently studied law at Columbia University, but he was more interested in writing. He learned several languages, including Spanish, German, and French. He paid the one-time enrollment fee to be able to learn a variety of subjects. He would sign up for a class and then later drop it. He again supported himself through college by writing boys' adventure stories and jokes. He also sold ideas to cartoonists. Using stenographers, he wrote up to 8,000 words of pulp fiction per day. His only complaint about his educational experience was that it failed to educate him about socialism. After leaving Columbia without a degree, he wrote four books in the next four years; they were commercially unsuccessful though critically well-received: King Midas (1901), Prince Hagen (1902), The Journal of Arthur Stirling (1903), and a Civil War novel, Manassas (1904).

Sinclair did not get on with his mother when he became older because of her strict rules and refusal to allow him independence. Sinclair later told his son, David, that around Sinclair's 16th year, he decided not to have anything to do with his mother, staying away from her for 35 years because an argument would start if they met.

Upton became close with Reverend William Wilmerding Moir. Moir specialized in sexual abstinence, and taught his beliefs to Sinclair. He was taught to "avoid the subject of sex." Sinclair was to report to Moir monthly regarding his abstinence. Despite their close relationship, Sinclair identified as agnostic.

== Career ==
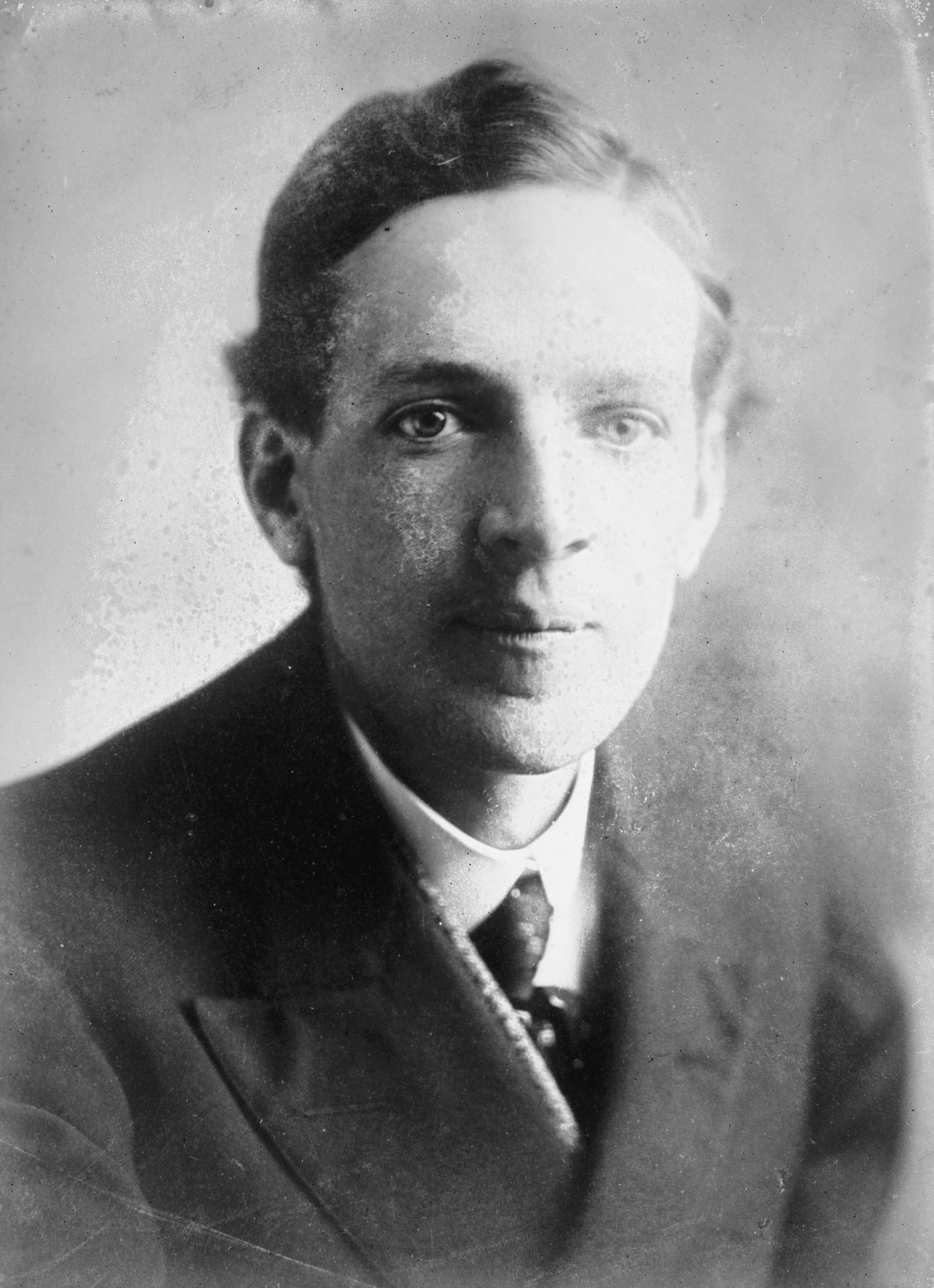
Upton Sinclair early in his career

Sinclair considered himself a poet and dedicated his time to writing poetry. In 1904, Sinclair spent seven weeks in disguise, working undercover in Chicago's meatpacking plants to research his novel The Jungle (1906), a political exposé that addressed conditions in the plants, as well as the lives of poor immigrants. When it was published two years later, it became a bestseller. In the spring of 1905, Sinclair issued a call for the formation of a new organization, a group to be called the Intercollegiate Socialist Society.

With the income from The Jungle, Sinclair founded the utopian—but non-Jewish white only—Helicon Home Colony in Englewood, New Jersey. He ran as a Socialist candidate for Congress. The colony burned down under suspicious circumstances within a year.

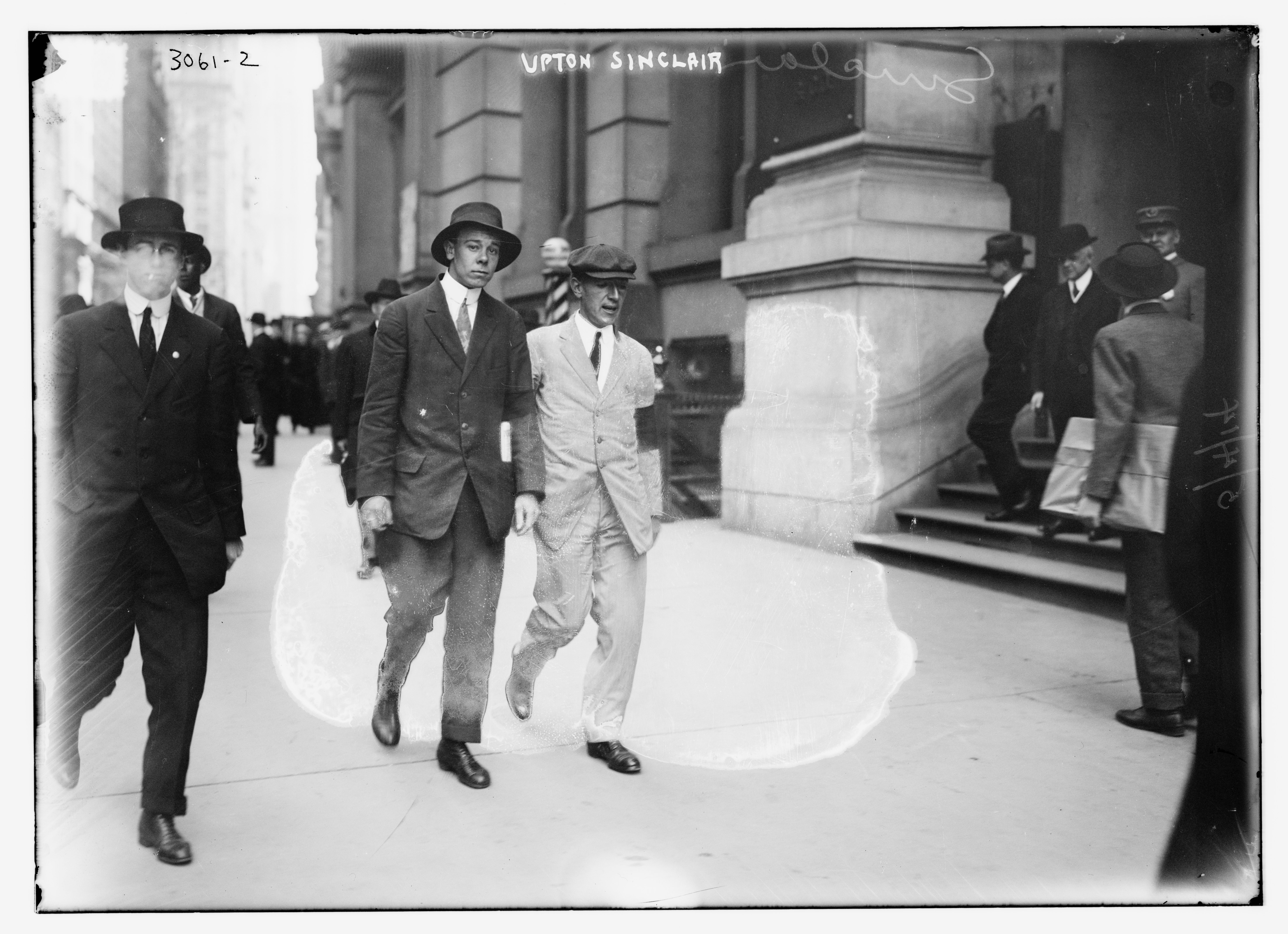
Upton Sinclair wearing a white suit and black armband, picketing the Rockefeller Building in New York City

In 1913–1914, Sinclair made three trips to the coal fields of Colorado, which led him to write King Coal and caused him to begin work on the larger, more historical The Coal War. In 1914, Sinclair helped organize demonstrations in New York City against Rockefeller at the Standard Oil offices. The demonstrations touched off more actions by the Industrial Workers of the World (IWW) and the Mother Earth group, a loose association of anarchists and IWW members, in Rockefeller's hometown of Tarrytown.

The Sinclairs moved to Pasadena, California in 1916 and lived there for nearly four decades. During his years with his second wife, Mary Craig, Sinclair wrote or produced several films. Recruited by Charlie Chaplin, Sinclair and Mary Craig produced Eisenstein's ¡Qué viva México! in 1930–32.

== Other interests ==
Sinclair was a founding member of the Workers' International Russian Famine Relief Committee, which was founded in Berlin on August 13, 1921. Other members included Maxim Gorky, Helen Crawfurd, George Grosz, Anatole France and Neil McLean MP.

Aside from his political and social activities, Sinclair took an interest in occult phenomena and experimented with telepathy. His book Mental Radio (1930) included accounts of his wife Mary's telepathic experiences and ability. William McDougall read the book and wrote an introduction to it, which led him to establish the parapsychology department at Duke University.

== Political career ==
=== Socialist politics ===
Sinclair's first campaign for public office came in 1906 when he ran for Congress in New Jersey's 4th congressional district, polling 3% of the vote. He broke with the Socialist Party in 1917 and supported the war effort during World War I. By the 1920s, however, he had returned to the party.

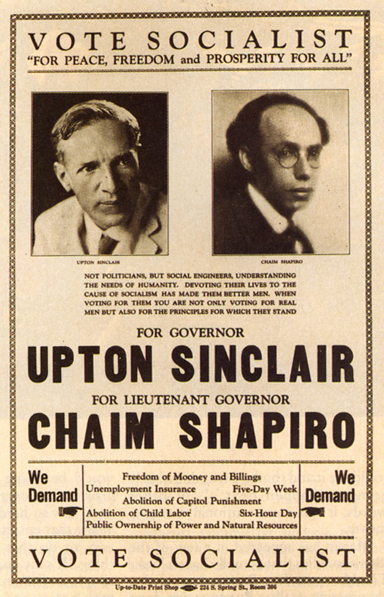
Socialist Party campaign poster featuring Sinclair and Chaim Shapiro as candidates for Governor and Lieutenant Governor of California, respectively, 1930

In the 1920s, the Sinclairs moved to Monrovia, California, (near Los Angeles), where Sinclair founded the state's chapter of the American Civil Liberties Union. Wanting to pursue politics, he twice ran unsuccessfully for Congress on the Socialist Party ticket: in 1920 for the House of Representatives and in 1922 for the Senate. He was the party candidate for governor of California in 1926, winning nearly 46,000 votes, and in 1930, winning nearly 50,000 votes.

During this period, Sinclair was also active in radical politics in Los Angeles. For instance, in 1923, to support the challenged free speech rights of Industrial Workers of the World, Sinclair spoke at a rally during the San Pedro Maritime Strike, in a neighborhood now known as Liberty Hill. He began to read from the Bill of Rights and was promptly arrested, along with hundreds of others, by the LAPD. The arresting officer proclaimed: "We'll have none of that Constitution stuff". In the same year, Sinclair founded the Southern California chapter of the American Civil Liberties Union.

=== 1934 gubernatorial election ===
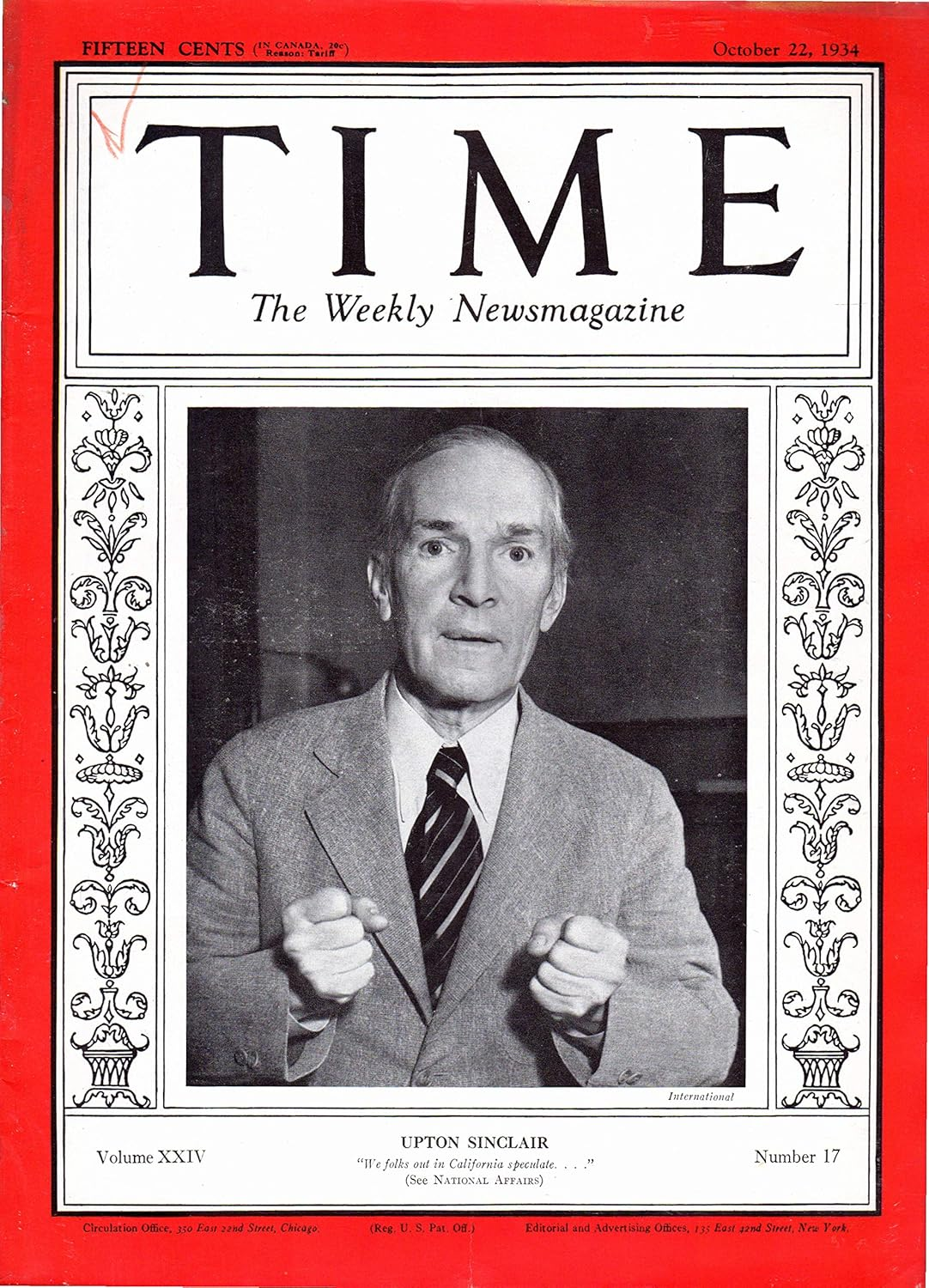
Sinclair on the cover of Time magazine, October 22, 1934

In 1934, Sinclair ran in the California gubernatorial election as a Democrat. Sinclair's platform, known as the End Poverty in California movement (EPIC), galvanized the support of the Democratic Party, and Sinclair gained its nomination. Gaining 879,000 votes made this his most successful run for office, but incumbent Governor Frank Merriam defeated him by a sizable margin, gaining 1,138,000 votes. Hollywood studio bosses unanimously opposed Sinclair. They pressured their employees to assist and vote for Merriam's campaign, and made false propaganda films attacking Sinclair, giving him no opportunity to respond. The negative campaign tactics used against Sinclair are briefly depicted in the 2020 American biographical drama film Mank. Upton Sinclair later stated that there was a "campaign of lying" against him during the campaign which was "ordered by the biggest businessmen in California and paid for with millions of dollars" that was carried out by newspapers, politicians, advertisers, and the film industry.

Sinclair's plan to end poverty quickly became a controversial issue under the pressure of numerous migrants to California fleeing the Dust Bowl. Conservatives considered his proposal an attempted communist takeover of their state and quickly opposed him, using propaganda to portray Sinclair as a staunch communist. Sinclair had been a member of the Socialist Party from 1902 to 1934, when he became a Democrat, though always considering himself a socialist in spirit. The Socialist Party in California and nationwide refused to allow its members to be active in any other party including the Democratic Party and expelled him, along with socialists who supported his California campaign. The expulsions destroyed the Socialist Party in California.

At the same time, American and Soviet communists disassociated themselves from him, considering him a capitalist. In later writings, such as his anti-alcohol book The Cup of Fury, Sinclair scathingly censured communism. Science-fiction author Robert A. Heinlein was deeply involved in Sinclair's campaign, although he attempted to move away from the stance later in his life. In the 21st century, Sinclair is considered an early American democratic socialist.

After his loss to Merriam, Sinclair abandoned EPIC and politics to return to writing. In 1935, he published I, Candidate for Governor: And How I Got Licked, in which he described the techniques employed by Merriam's supporters, including the then popular Aimee Semple McPherson, who vehemently opposed socialism and what she perceived as Sinclair's modernism. Sinclair's line from this book "It is difficult to get a man to understand something, when his salary depends upon his not understanding it" has become well known and was for example quoted by Al Gore in An Inconvenient Truth.

Of his gubernatorial bid, Sinclair remarked in 1951:

The American People will take Socialism, but they won't take the label. I certainly proved it in the case of EPIC. Running on the Socialist ticket I got 60,000 votes, and running on the slogan to 'End Poverty in California' I got 879,000. I think we simply have to recognize the fact that our enemies have succeeded in spreading the Big Lie. There is no use attacking it by a front attack, it is much better to out-flank them.

== Personal life ==
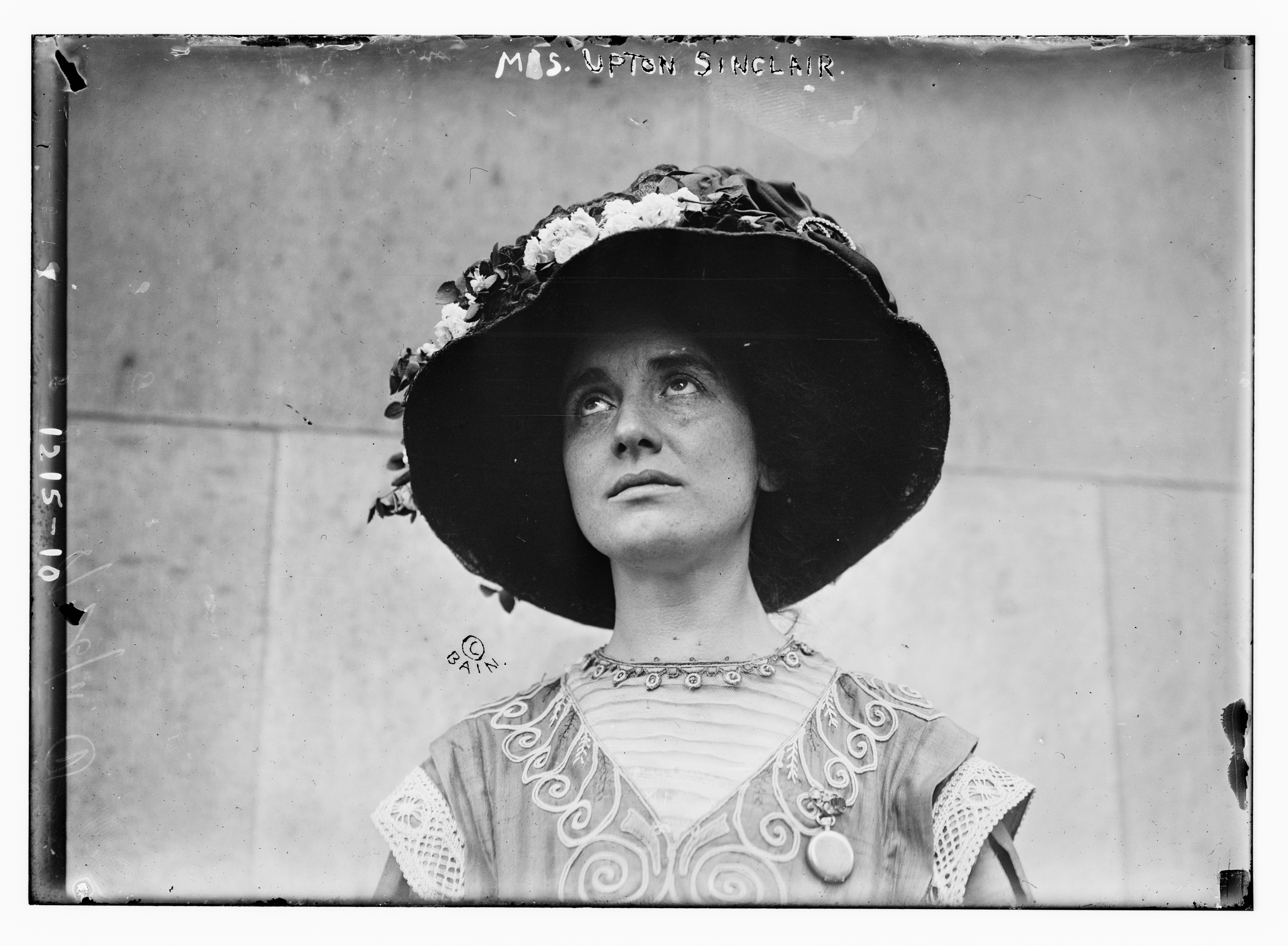
Meta Fuller Sinclair

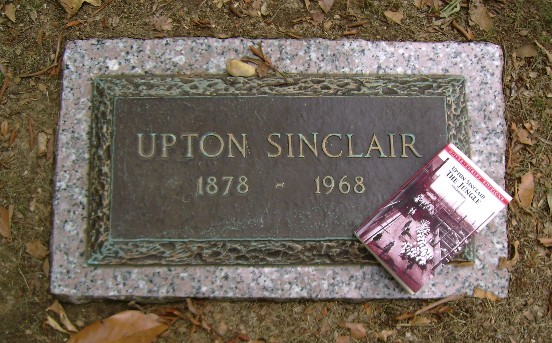
Sinclair's grave in Rock Creek Cemetery, Washington, D.C.

In April 1900, Sinclair went to Lake Massawippi in Quebec to work on a novel, renting a small cabin for three months and then moving to a farmhouse where he was reintroduced to Meta Fuller (1880–1964), who later became his first wife. A childhood friend descended from one of the First Families of Virginia, she was three years younger than he and aspired to be more than a housewife, so Sinclair instructed her in what to read and learn. Though each had warned the other against it, on October 18, 1900, they married. The couple having used abstinence as their main form of contraception, Meta became pregnant the following year. Despite Meta's several attempts to terminate the pregnancy, the child, David, was born on December 1, 1901. (Note: David Sinclair (1901–1987) became a physicist.) Meta and her family tried to convince Sinclair to give up writing and get "a job that would support his family."

Sinclair was opposed to sex outside of marriage. He viewed sex as necessary only for reproduction. He told his first wife Meta that only the birth of a child gave marriage "dignity and meaning". Despite his beliefs, Sinclair had a love affair with Anna Noyes during his marriage to Meta. He wrote a novel about the affair called Love's Progress, a sequel to Love's Pilgrimage. It was never published. His wife later had a love affair with John Armistead Collier, a theology student from Memphis; they had a son together named Ben.

In 1910, the Sinclairs moved to the single-tax village of Arden, Delaware, where they built a house. In 1911, Sinclair was arrested for playing tennis on the Sabbath and spent eighteen hours in the New Castle County prison in lieu of paying a fine. Earlier in 1911, Sinclair invited Harry Kemp, the "Vagabond Poet", to camp on the couple's land in Arden. Meta soon became enamored of Kemp, and in late August she left Sinclair for the poet. Sinclair, unable to obtain a divorce in New York, traveled to the Netherlands for a migratory divorce. An Amsterdam court declared their marriage annulled May 24, 1912 on the basis of adultery by Meta. Sinclair declared before the court that they were both living in Hilversum, The Netherlands, Meta being temporarily in New York.

In 1913, Sinclair married Mary Craig Kimbrough (1882–1961), a woman from an elite Greenwood, Mississippi, family and author of articles on Winnie Davis, the daughter of Confederate States of America President Jefferson Davis. They met when she attended one of his lectures about The Jungle. In 1914 he moved to Croton-on-Hudson, New York, joining the local community of prominent socialists. In the 1920s, the couple moved to Long Beach, California. They remained married until her death in 1961.

Shortly after the death of Kimbrough, Sinclair married his third wife, Mary Elizabeth Willis (1882–1967). They moved to Buckeye, Arizona, before returning east to Bound Brook, New Jersey, where Sinclair died in a nursing home on November 25, 1968, a year after Mary. He is buried next to Willis in Rock Creek Cemetery in Washington, D.C.

Sinclair's cousin was Wallis Simpson, a socialite whose romance with King Edward VIII led to his abdication in 1936. Sinclair wrote in support of their marriage, and described Edward's decision to abdicate as "a democratic gesture whether [he] realizes it or not."

== Writing ==
Sinclair devoted his writing career to documenting and criticizing the social and economic conditions of the early 20th century in both fiction and nonfiction. He exposed his view of the injustices of capitalism and the overwhelming effects of poverty among the working class. He also edited collections of fiction and nonfiction.

=== The Jungle ===
His fictional novel based on the meatpacking industry in Chicago, The Jungle, was first published in serial form in the socialist newspaper Appeal to Reason, from February 25, 1905, to November 4, 1905. It was published as a book by Doubleday in 1906.

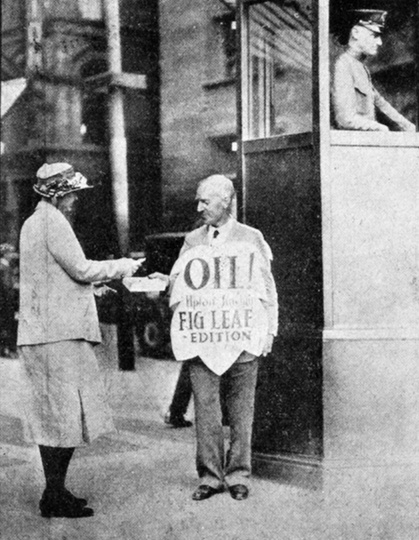
Upton Sinclair selling the "Fig Leaf Edition" of his book Oil! (1927) in Boston. The book had drawn the ire of that town's infamous censors who objected to a brief sex scene that takes place in the novel.

Sinclair had spent about six months investigating the Chicago meatpacking industry for Appeal to Reason, the work which inspired his novel. He intended to "set forth the breaking of human hearts by a system which exploits the labor of men and women for profit". The novel featured Jurgis Rudkus, a Lithuanian immigrant who works in a meat factory in Chicago, his teenage wife Ona Lukoszaite, and their extended family. Sinclair portrays their mistreatment by Rudkus' employers and the wealthier elements of society. His descriptions of the unsanitary and inhumane conditions that workers suffered served to shock and galvanize readers. Jack London called Sinclair's book "the Uncle Tom's Cabin of wage slavery". Domestic and foreign purchases of American meat fell by half.

Sinclair wrote in Cosmopolitan in October 1906 about The Jungle: "I aimed at the public's heart, and by accident I hit it in the stomach." The novel brought public lobbying for Congressional legislation and government regulation of the industry, including passage of the Meat Inspection Act and the Pure Food and Drug Act. At the time, President Theodore Roosevelt characterized Sinclair as a "crackpot", writing to William Allen White, "I have an utter contempt for him. He is hysterical, unbalanced, and untruthful. Three-fourths of the things he said were absolute falsehoods. For some of the remainder there was only a basis of truth." After reading The Jungle, Roosevelt agreed with some of Sinclair's conclusions. He said, "Radical action must be taken to do away with the efforts of arrogant and selfish greed on the part of the capitalist." But in the end he said he was opposed to legislation that he and others considered "socialist."

Bertolt Brecht's play, Saint Joan of the Stockyards, transporting Joan of Arc to the environment of the Chicago stockyards, is clearly inspired by "The Jungle".

=== The Millennium: A Comedy of the Year 2000 (1907) ===
In The Millennium, capitalism finds its zenith with the construction of The Pleasure Palace. During the grand opening of this 100-story edifice, an explosion kills almost everybody in the world. The eleven remaining struggle to survive in a newly-class-less society without workers and servants. A few leave to create a utopian "Cooperative Commonwealth." The others go successively through periods of small-scale slavery, feudalism and industrial capitalism before most of them leave to join the co-operators outside.

=== The Brass Check ===
In The Brass Check (1919), Sinclair made a systematic and incriminating critique of the severe limitations of the "free press" in the United States. Among the topics covered is the use of yellow journalism techniques created by William Randolph Hearst. Sinclair called The Brass Check "the most important and most dangerous book I have ever written."

According to The Brass Check, "American Journalism is a class institution, serving the rich and spurning the poor." This bias, Sinclair felt, had profound implications for American democracy:

The social body to which we belong is at this moment passing through one of the greatest crises of its history .... What if the nerves upon which we depend for knowledge of this social body should give us false reports of its condition?

=== Sylvia novels ===
- Sylvia (1913) was a novel about a Southern girl. In her autobiography, Mary Craig Sinclair said she had written the book based on her own experiences as a girl, and Upton collaborated with her. According to Craig, at her insistence, Sinclair published Sylvia (1913) under his name. In her 1957 memoir, she described how her husband and she had collaborated on the work: "Upton and I struggled through several chapters of Sylvia together, disagreeing about something on every page. But now and then each of us admitted that the other had improved something." When it appeared in 1913, The New York Times called it "the best novel Mr. Sinclair has yet written–so much the best that it stands in a class by itself."
- Sylvia's Marriage (1914), Craig and Sinclair collaborated on a sequel, also published by John C. Winston Company under Upton Sinclair's name. In his 1962 autobiography, Upton Sinclair wrote: "[Mary] Craig had written some tales of her Southern girlhood; and I had stolen them from her for a novel to be called Sylvia."

=== EPIC book series and 1934 California gubernatorial campaign ===
Sinclair's books The EPIC Plan for California (EPIC being an epigram for End Poverty in California), Immediate Epic: The Final Statement of the Plan and Epic Answers: How to End Poverty in California were published in 1934.

I, Governor of California, and How I Ended Poverty: A True Story of the Future was a pamphlet he published in 1934 as a preface to running for office in the state of California. In the book he outlined his plans to run as a Democrat instead of a Socialist, and imagines his climb to the Democratic nomination, and then subsequent victory by a margin of 100,000 votes.

=== Lanny Budd series ===
Between 1940 and 1953, Sinclair wrote a series of 11 novels featuring a central character named Lanny Budd. The son of an American arms manufacturer, Budd is portrayed as holding in the confidence of world leaders, and not simply witnessing events, but often propelling them. As a sophisticated socialite who mingles easily with people from all cultures and socioeconomic classes, Budd has been characterized as the antithesis of the stereotyped "Ugly American".

Sinclair placed Budd within the important political events in the United States and Europe in the first half of the 20th century. An actual company named the Budd Company manufactured arms during World War II, founded by Edward G. Budd in 1912.

The novels were bestsellers upon publication and were published in translation, appearing in 21 countries. The third book in the series, Dragon's Teeth (1942), won the Pulitzer Prize for the Novel in 1943. Out of print and nearly forgotten for years, ebook editions of the Lanny Budd series were published in 2016.

The Lanny Budd series includes:

- World's End, 1940
- Between Two Worlds, 1941
- Dragon's Teeth, 1942
- Wide is the Gate, 1943
- Presidential Agent, 1944
- Dragon Harvest, 1945
- A World to Win, 1946
- Presidential Mission, 1947
- One Clear Call, 1948
- O Shepherd, Speak!, 1949
- The Return of Lanny Budd, 1953

=== Other works ===
Sinclair was keenly interested in health and nutrition. He experimented with various diets, and with fasting. He wrote about this in his book, The Fasting Cure (1911), another bestseller. He believed that periodic fasting was important for health, saying, "I had taken several fasts of ten or twelve days' duration, with the result of a complete making over of my health".

Sinclair favored a raw food diet of predominantly vegetables and nuts. For long periods of time, he was a complete vegetarian, but he also experimented with eating meat. His attitude to these matters was fully explained in the chapter, "The Use of Meat", in the above-mentioned book. In the last years of his life, Sinclair strictly ate three meals a day consisting only of brown rice, fresh fruit and celery, topped with powdered milk and salt, and pineapple juice to drink.

== Works ==
=== Fiction ===
- Tommy Junior The Second – The Argosy, July 1895
- Courtmartialed – 1898
- Saved By the Enemy – 1898
- The Fighting Squadron – 1898
- A Prisoner of Morro – 1898
- A Soldier Monk – 1898
- A Gauntlet of Fire – 1899
- Holding the Fort – 1899
- A Soldier's Pledge – 1899
- Wolves of the Navy – 1899
- Springtime and Harvest – 1901, reissued the same year as King Midas
- The Journal of Arthur Stirling – 1903
- Off For West Point – 1903
- From Port to Port – 1903
- On Guard – 1903
- A Strange Cruise – 1903
- The West Point Rivals – 1903
- A West Point Treasure – 1903
- A Cadet's Honor – 1903
- Cliff, the Naval Cadet – 1903
- The Cruise of the Training Ship – 1903
- Prince Hagen – 1903
- Manassas: A Novel of the War – 1904, reissued in 1959 as Theirs be the Guilt
- A Captain of Industry – 1906
- The Jungle – 1906
- The Overman – 1907
- The Industrial Republic – 1907
- The Metropolis – 1908
- The Moneychangers – 1908, reprinted as The Money Changers
- Samuel The Seeker – 1910
- Love's Pilgrimage – 1911
- Damaged Goods – 1913
- Sylvia – 1913
- Sylvia's Marriage – 1914
- King Coal – 1917
- Jimmie Higgins – 1919
- Debs and the Poets – 1920
- 100% – The Story of a Patriot – 1920
- They Call Me Carpenter: A Tale of the Second Coming – 1922
- The Spokesman's Secretary – 1926
- Oil! – 1927
- Boston, 2 vols. – 1928
- Mountain City – 1930
- Roman Holiday – 1931
- The Wet Parade – 1931
- American Outpost – 1932
- The Way Out (novel) – 1933
- Immediate Epic – 1933
- The Lie Factory Starts – 1934
- The Book of Love – 1934
- Depression Island – 1935
- Co-op: a Novel of Living Together – 1936
- The Gnomobile – 1936, 1962
- Wally for Queen – 1936
- No Pasaran!: A Novel of the Battle of Madrid – 1937
- The Flivver King: A Story of Ford-America – 1937
- Little Steel – 1938
- Our Lady – 1938
- Expect No Peace – 1939
- Marie Antoinette (novel) – 1939
- Telling The World – 1939
- Your Million Dollars – 1939
- World's End – 1940
- World's End Impending – 1940
- Between Two Worlds – 1941
- Dragon's Teeth – 1942
- Wide Is the Gate – 1943
- Presidential Agent – 1944
- Dragon Harvest – 1945
- A World to Win – 1946
- A Presidential Mission – 1947
- A Giant's Strength – 1948
- Limbo on the Loose – 1948
- One Clear Call – 1948
- O Shepherd, Speak! – 1949
- Another Pamela – 1950
- Schenk Stefan! – 1951
- A Personal Jesus – 1952
- The Return of Lanny Budd – 1953
- What Didymus Did – UK 1954 / It Happened to Didymus – US 1958
- Theirs Be the Guilt – 1959
- Affectionately Eve – 1961
- The Coal War – 1976

==== Other ====
- Sinclair, Upton. Upton Sinclair Anthology (1947) online
- Engs, Ruth Clifford, ed. Unseen Upton Sinclair: Nine Unpublished Stories, Essays and Other Works. (McFarland & Co. 2009).

=== Autobiographical ===
- The Autobiography of Upton Sinclair. With Maeve Elizabeth Flynn III. New York: Harcourt, Brace & World, 1962.
- My Lifetime in Letters. Columbia, MO: University of Missouri Press, 1960) online.
- The Cup of Fury – 1956

=== Non-fiction ===
- Sinclair, Upton; Williams, Michael (1909). Good Health and How We Won It: With an Account of New Hygiene. New York: Frederick A. Stokes Company, Publishers. hdl:2027/mdp.39015052210583. OCLC 1476950524.
- The Fasting Cure – 1911
- The Profits of Religion – 1917
- The Brass Check – 1919
- McNeal, T. A.; Sinclair, Upton (1921). McNeal-Sinclair Debate on Socialism. Ten cent pocket series; no. 234. Girard, Kansas: Haldeman-Julius Company. hdl:2027/coo.31924030332716. OCLC 1408761760.
- The Book of Life. Pasadena, Calif., Chicago: Upton Sinclair; Wholesale distributors, Paine Book Co. 1922. hdl:2027/coo1.ark:/13960/t04x5vb8x. OCLC 644454786.
- The Goose-Step – 1923
- The Goslings: A Study of the American Schools. 1924. OCLC 314675830.
- Mammonart. An Essay in Economic Interpretation – 1925
- Letters to Judd, an American Workingman. Pasadena, CA: The author. 1925. hdl:2027/coo.31924030404325. OCLC 1496349431.
- Money Writes!. New York: A. & C. Boni. 1927. hdl:2027/uc1.$b113567. OCLC 614662777.
- Mental Radio: Does it work, and how? – 1930, 1962
- Upton Sinclair Presents William Fox – 1933
- Epic Answers: How to End Poverty in California. Los Angeles, Calif.: End Poverty League. 1934. OCLC 1288406151.
- The EPIC Plan for California. New York: Farrar & Rinehart. 1934. hdl:2027/uc1.b4080544. OCLC 555500859.
- I, Governor of California, and How I Ended Poverty: A True Story of the Future. Los Angeles, California: End Poverty League Incorporated. 1934. OCLC 1252363055.
- Immediate Epic: The Final Statement of the Plan. Los Angeles, Calif.: End Poverty League. 1934. hdl:2027/uc1.b4080544. OCLC 609477646.
- We, People of America, And How We Ended Poverty: A True Story of the Future. Pasadena, Calif.: National EPIC league. 1935. hdl:2027/mdp.39015059479066. OCLC 1467295145.
- I, Candidate for Governor And How I Got Licked. University of California Press. 1935. OCLC 1527259587. ISBN 978-0-520-91352-3
- What God Means to Me: An Attempt at a Working Religion. Pasadena: Upton Sinclair. 1936. OCLC 1439056275.
- Upton Sinclair on the Soviet Union. New York: Weekly Masses Co. 1938. OCLC 1439053857 – via archive.org.
- Letters to a Millionaire. London: T.W. Laurie. 1939. OCLC 12304661.

=== Drama ===
- Plays of Protest: The Naturewoman, The Machine, The Second-Story Man, Prince Hagen – 1912
- The Pot Boiler – 1913 (Not published in book form until 1924 – as Little Blue Book 589, issued by E. Haldeman-Julius.)
- Hell: A Verse Drama and Photoplay – 1924
- Singing Jailbirds: A Drama in Four Acts – 1924
- Bill Porter: A Drama of O. Henry in Prison – 1925
- The Enemy Had It Too: A Play in Three Acts – 1950

=== As editor ===
- The Cry for Justice: An Anthology of the Literature of Social Protest – 1915

== Representation in popular culture ==
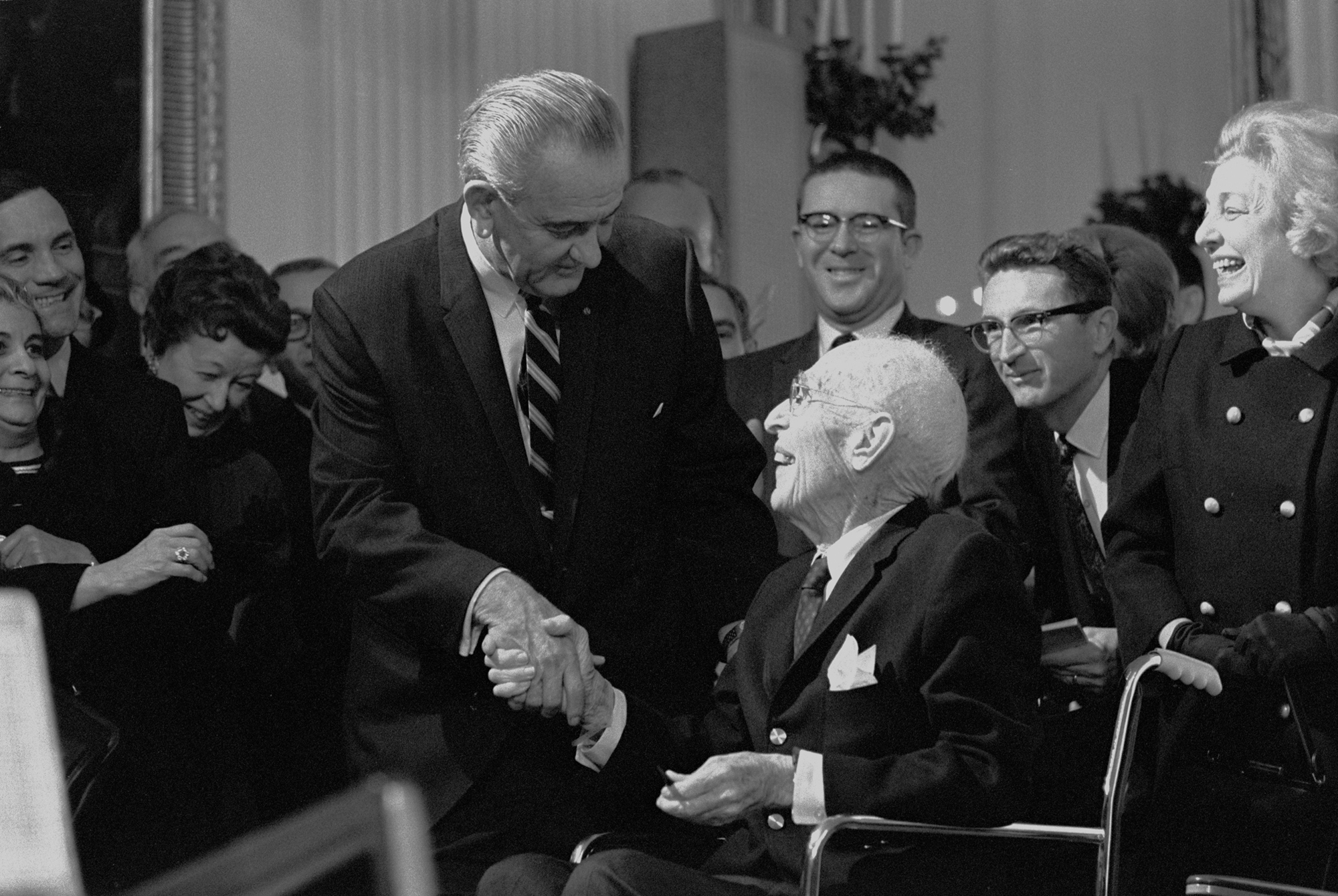
President Lyndon B. Johnson greets Sinclair

- Sinclair Lewis refers to Upton Sinclair and his EPIC plan in the novel It Can't Happen Here (1935).
- Sinclair appears in T. C. Boyle's novel The Road to Wellville (1993), which is built around a historical fictionalization of John Harvey Kellogg, the inventor of corn flakes and the founder of the Battle Creek Sanitarium. In the book, Sinclair and his first wife, Meta, appear as patients at the Sanitarium. Later, Kellogg is outraged when he discovers that another of his patients has been fasting after reading a typescript of Sinclair's The Fasting Cure.
- Sinclair appears in the American Empire trilogy (2001–2003), part of the wider Southern Victory series of alternate history novels by Harry Turtledove. In the series, Sinclair becomes president of the United States, serving from 1921 to 1929, as the first president from the Socialist Party. During his administration, he builds up social welfare programs at home and tries to foster peace abroad. Sinclair takes a more lenient stance towards the Confederacy than his predecessor Theodore Roosevelt did, cancelling Great War reparations following the assassination of Confederate President Wade Hampton V in 1922.
- Sinclair is featured as one of the main characters in Chris Bachelder's satirical novel, U.S.! (2005). Repeatedly, Sinclair is resurrected after his death and assassinated again, a "personification of the contemporary failings of the American left". He is portrayed as a quixotic reformer attempting to stir an apathetic American public to implement socialism in America.
- Joyce Carol Oates refers to Sinclair and his first wife, Meta, in her novel The Accursed (2013).
- Sinclair was portrayed by Bill Nye in David Fincher's biopic Mank (2020).
- Sinclair was portrayed by Fisher Stevens in Coup! (2023).
- In the Musical Fiorello (1959), he is referred to in the song "On the Side of the Angels" in the lyric "My life will be selfless and pure, like Upton Sinclair."

== Films ==
- The Jungle (1914) is a silent film adaptation of the 1906 novel, with George Nash playing Jurgis Rudkus and Gail Kane playing Ona Lukozsaite. The film is considered lost. Sinclair appears at the beginning and end of the film as a form of endorsement.
- The Wet Parade (1932) is a film adaptation of Sinclair's eponymous 1931 novel, directed by Victor Fleming and starring Lewis Stone, Walter Huston, Dorothy Jordan, Neil Hamilton, Robert Young, and Jimmy Durante. Myrna Loy appears very briefly as an actress who runs an elegant speakeasy.
- Walt Disney Productions adapted The Gnomobile (1937) into the 1967 musical motion picture The Gnome-Mobile.
- Oil! (1927) was adapted as the film There Will Be Blood (2007), starring Daniel Day-Lewis and Paul Dano, and directed by Paul Thomas Anderson. The film received eight Oscar nominations and won two.
- In David Fincher's film drama Mank (2020), Bill Nye has a small role as Sinclair running for California governor in 1934 as the Democratic nominee.

== See also ==
- Upton Sinclair House—in Monrovia, California
- Will H. Kindig, a supporter on the Los Angeles City Council
- List of residences of American writers

== Explanatory notes ==
Party political offices
Preceded by Milton M. Young	Democratic nominee for governor of California; 1934	Succeeded by Culbert Olson
Vacant Title last held by Noble A. Richardson, 1914	Socialist nominee for governor of California; 1926, 1930	Party defunct
