= Privacy =

Seclusion from unwanted attention or disclosure

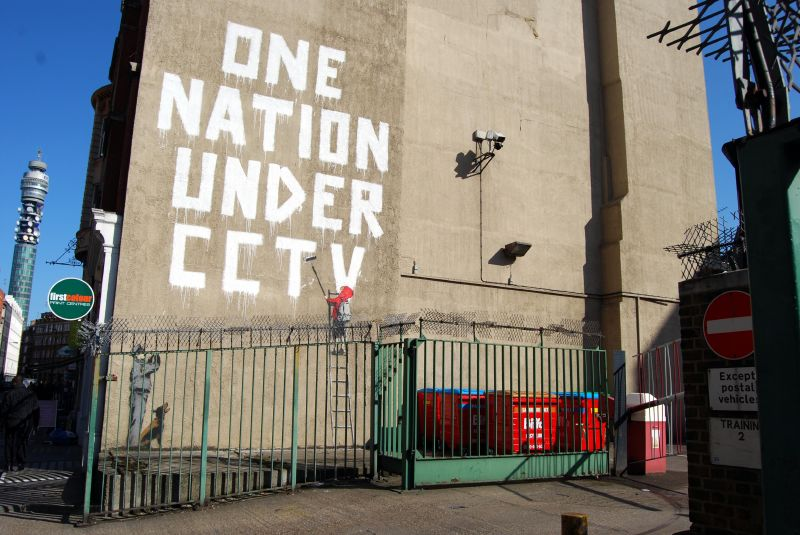
Banksy's One Nation Under CCTV (2008), painted beside a working closed-circuit television camera in London

Privacy (UK: /ˈprɪvəsi/, US: /ˈpraɪvəsi/) is generally considered to be the condition or claim of an individual or group to be free from unwanted access, observation or disclosure, and to determine for themselves how far they, and information about them, are exposed to others. The concept has no single accepted definition. Lawyers, philosophers and social scientists have variously understood it as a right to be let alone, as limited access to the self, as secrecy, as control over personal information, as a precondition of personhood and intimate relationships, and as the appropriate flow of information within social contexts. Some philosophers doubt that it is a distinct value at all, and feminist and communitarian critics have questioned the weight it is given.

Distinctions between public and private life are found in many ancient societies and religious traditions, but privacy emerged as a distinct legal claim only in the nineteenth century, when new printing and photographic technologies and the popular press prompted calls for legal protection. From the second half of the twentieth century the spread of computers shifted attention from intrusion and publicity towards the collection and processing of personal data. The result was a body of data protection law that began in Western Europe in the 1970s and has since spread worldwide. Privacy is protected as a human right by Article 12 of the Universal Declaration of Human Rights, Article 17 of the International Covenant on Civil and Political Rights and regional instruments such as Article 8 of the European Convention on Human Rights. The structure of protection differs between jurisdictions. European law tends to treat privacy as an aspect of personal dignity and regulates the processing of personal data comprehensively, whereas law in the United States has traditionally emphasised liberty against the state and regulates the private sector by sector. Health and genetic data are widely given special protection.

Scholars have classified the activities that harm privacy, from surveillance and the aggregation of data to disclosure, exposure and intrusion. The Internet, mobile phones and large-scale data analysis have intensified debate about surveillance by governments and corporations and about the commercial use of personal data. Machine-learning systems add further concerns: they are trained on data gathered without the knowledge of the people it concerns, they can leak that data, and they can fabricate realistic "deepfake" images of identifiable people. Research on the "privacy paradox" has examined why people's stated concern for privacy often seems to diverge from their behaviour, and economists have tried to measure the value people place on personal information.

Privacy overlaps with, but is distinct from, security. Information security concerns the protection of data against unauthorised access, whereas privacy also concerns whether data should be collected and used at all, and for what purposes. Responses to privacy problems include legislation and litigation; privacy-enhancing technologies such as encryption and anonymity tools; "privacy by design"; and the work of advocacy organisations. Critics argue that the prevailing model of notice and individual consent places an unrealistic burden on individuals.

== Etymology ==
The English word privacy is derived from private, which comes from the Latin privatus, "set apart (from what is public), belonging to oneself (not to the state)". Privatus is the perfect passive participle of the verb prīvō (infinitive prīvāre), "to bereave, deprive" and also "to free, release", which is itself derived from privus, "one's own, individual".

== Conceptions of privacy ==
Scholars have long observed that privacy is a contested and internally diverse concept. Daniel J. Solove describes it as "a concept in disarray" and groups the main theoretical accounts into six families: the right to be let alone, limited access to the self, secrecy, control over personal information, personhood, and intimacy. Each captures some privacy problems while failing to account for others, which has led Solove and others to favour pluralistic or contextual accounts over a single definition.

=== The right to be let alone ===
In "The Right to Privacy" (1890), the Boston lawyers Samuel D. Warren and Louis Brandeis argued that the common law should recognise a general "right to be let alone", a phrase they took from Judge Thomas M. Cooley. Their immediate concern was that "instantaneous photographs and newspaper enterprise" had "invaded the sacred precincts of private and domestic life", a reference to the sensationalist press of the period, often described as yellow journalism. They grounded the right not in property or contract but in the protection of an "inviolate personality".

The formula proved influential but indeterminate, since it does not explain which forms of being left alone the law should protect. It has been read to include a person's right to choose seclusion from the attention of others, and to be free from scrutiny or observation in private settings such as the home. Although the concept did not define privacy precisely enough to ground comprehensive legal protection, it strengthened the notion of an individual right to privacy and began a long tradition of debate about such rights in the United States.

=== Limited access ===
A second family of theories treats privacy as limited accessibility to the self. In 1890 the American journalist E. L. Godkin described private life as "the right of every man to keep his affairs to himself, and to decide for himself to what extent they shall be the subject of public observation and discussion". Ruth Gavison developed the idea analytically, arguing that privacy concerns the extent to which a person is known to others (secrecy), the subject of their attention (anonymity) and physically accessible to them (solitude). Sissela Bok similarly defined privacy as "the condition of being protected from unwanted access by others—either physical access, personal information, or attention".

=== Secrecy ===
On a narrower view, privacy is the concealment of discreditable or sensitive information. Richard Posner described it as the right of people to "conceal information about themselves that others might use to their disadvantage", and argued on economic grounds that such concealment can amount to a form of misrepresentation that impairs the efficient working of markets. When privacy is understood as secrecy, it is usually imagined as a selective secrecy, in which individuals keep some information private while choosing to make other information public. Critics reply that the secrecy view cannot explain why a person may retain a privacy interest in information that has already been disclosed to some people, or in information that is not discreditable at all.

=== Control over personal information ===
The most influential definition in the information age is that of the political scientist Alan Westin, for whom privacy is "the claim of individuals, groups, or institutions to determine for themselves when, how, and to what extent information about them is communicated to others". The philosopher Charles Fried likewise argued that privacy "is not simply an absence of information about us in the minds of others; rather it is the control we have over information about ourselves". The control model underlies the Fair Information Practice Principles on which most data protection legislation is built. It has been criticised for presupposing that individuals are able to make informed choices about complex and opaque data practices.

The psychologist Carl A. Johnson tied privacy to the psychological concept of "personal control", which he modelled as a process with four stages and two kinds of behaviour–outcome relationship, the outcomes depending on both situational and personal factors. On this model, privacy consists of "behaviors falling at specific locations on these two dimensions". The four stages are outcome choice control, the selection between possible outcomes; behaviour selection control, the selection between strategies for attaining the chosen outcome; outcome effectance, the carrying out of the chosen behaviour so as to achieve the outcome; and outcome realisation control, the person's interpretation of the outcome achieved. The two dimensions are primary control, in which behaviour directly causes outcomes, and secondary control, in which it does so indirectly. Johnson treated privacy as behaviour exercising secondary control over outcomes, and argued that a person's conception of privacy itself depends on these behaviour–outcome relationships; he developed the account in dialogue with the work of Irwin Altman, and of Maxine Wolfe and Robert S. Laufer.

The philosopher Lorenzo Magnani extends the idea of control to personal identity. He argues that consciousness is partly constituted by external representations of the self, such as narratives and data stored outside the body, but that much of it consists of internal representations that remain private and are rarely externalised. Magnani describes this internal privacy as a form of "information property" or "moral capital" that is essential to free choice and personal agency. When too much of a person's identity is externalised and subjected to scrutiny, he contends, the result is a loss of control, dignity and responsibility; the protection of privacy therefore safeguards the ability to pursue personal projects free from intrusive external forces.

=== Contextual integrity ===
Helen Nissenbaum's theory of contextual integrity holds that privacy is violated not by disclosure as such but by information flows that breach the norms of the social context in which the information was shared. A patient's disclosure of symptoms to a doctor is appropriate within medicine but would violate contextual norms if passed to an employer. The theory has been taken up in several fields of computer science, although a survey of that work found that computer scientists have often used its idea of "context" loosely and seldom engaged with its normative claims.

=== Personhood, autonomy and personal growth ===
Privacy may be understood as a prerequisite for the development of a sense of self-identity. Privacy barriers, in particular, are instrumental in this process. According to Irwin Altman, such barriers "define and limit the boundaries of the self" and thus "serve to help define [the self]." This control primarily entails the ability to regulate contact with others. Control over the "permeability" of the self's boundaries enables one to control what constitutes the self and thus to define what is the self.

Several philosophers present privacy as a condition for the development of personhood. Jeffrey Reiman argued that privacy is a social ritual through which a society confers on individuals moral title to their own existence, so that the right to privacy protects the individual's standing as a self-determining person. Stanley Benn grounded privacy in respect for persons as choosers, observing that covert observation alters, without the person's knowledge, the conditions under which he or she chooses. Joseph Kupfer linked privacy to the formation of an autonomous self-concept, drawing on studies of child development and on Erving Goffman's account of "total institutions", in which the systematic deprivation of privacy erodes inmates' sense of self. For Kupfer, an autonomous self-concept is a conception of oneself as a "purposeful, self-determining, responsible agent". It includes an awareness that one can control the boundary between self and others: who may have access to one, and to what extent. In United States constitutional law, a related "decisional" conception of privacy protected choices about contraception, abortion and intimate relationships.

Privacy may also be seen as a condition of personal growth. Following the legal philosopher Hyman Gross, Kupfer argues that solitude, anonymity and temporary release from social roles give people room for self-expression, self-discovery and self-criticism, through which they come to understand themselves and form a sense of identity.

=== Intimacy ===
Intimacy theories locate the value of privacy in the relationships it makes possible. On this view, intimate relationships are built by sharing with particular people information and experiences that are withheld from others, so that privacy is a precondition of intimacy rather than an obstacle to it. Because part of human relationships includes individuals volunteering to self-disclose most if not all personal information, this is one area in which privacy does not apply.

James Rachels advanced this notion by writing that privacy matters because "there is a close connection between our ability to control who has access to us and to information about us, and our ability to create and maintain different sorts of social relationships with different people." On this view privacy allows people to calibrate what they disclose to friends, colleagues and strangers, and so makes intimate relationships possible. Hence, protecting intimacy is also at the core of the concept of sexual privacy. The legal scholar Danielle Citron has built on this tradition to argue that "sexual privacy" deserves recognition as a distinct and especially weighty interest.

== Forms of privacy ==
Alongside general theories of what privacy is, scholars have distinguished the experiences that privacy makes possible and the domains in which it is claimed, from the physical space around a person to the confidential activities of organisations.

=== States of privacy ===
Alan Westin defined four states—or experiences—of privacy: solitude, intimacy, anonymity, and reserve. Solitude is a physical separation from others; Intimacy is a "close, relaxed; and frank relationship between two or more individuals" that results from the seclusion of a pair or small group of individuals. Anonymity is the "desire of individuals for times of 'public privacy.'" Lastly, reserve is the "creation of a psychological barrier against unwanted intrusion"; this creation of a psychological barrier requires others to respect an individual's need or desire to restrict communication of information concerning themself.

In addition to the psychological barrier of reserve, Kirsty Hughes identified three more kinds of privacy barriers: physical, behavioural, and normative. Physical barriers, such as walls and doors, prevent others from accessing and experiencing the individual. (In this sense, "accessing" an individual includes accessing personal information about them.) Behavioral barriers communicate to others—verbally, through language, or non-verbally, through personal space, body language, or clothing—that an individual does not want the other person to access or experience them. Lastly, normative barriers, such as laws and social norms, restrain others from attempting to access or experience an individual.

=== Physical privacy ===
Frosted glass is a common method of preventing visual intrusion and safeguarding physical privacy.

Physical privacy may be defined as the prevention of "intrusions into one's physical space or solitude". An example of a legal basis for physical privacy is the Fourth Amendment to the United States Constitution, which guarantees "the right of the people to be secure in their persons, houses, papers, and effects, against unreasonable searches and seizures".

Physical privacy may be a matter of cultural sensitivity, personal dignity or shyness, and may also involve concerns about safety, for example on the part of people who fear becoming victims of crime or stalking. It can involve protection against being watched, directly or through recorded images, during intimate behaviour or while exposing intimate parts, and against unauthorised access to one's possessions or places.

=== Health and genetic information ===
Medical confidentiality is one of the oldest forms of protected information: the Hippocratic Oath binds physicians to keep secret what they learn in the course of treatment. Modern law treats health data as especially sensitive. In Whalen v. Roe (1977) the Supreme Court of the United States accepted that the privacy cases protect an "individual interest in avoiding disclosure of personal matters". It nevertheless upheld a New York database of prescriptions for dangerous drugs, because the state had adequate safeguards against disclosure. In Z v Finland (1997) the European Court of Human Rights stated that the protection of personal data, "not least medical data, is of fundamental importance" to the right to respect for private life. The Court held that orders compelling the applicant's doctors to testify, and the seizure of her medical records, in criminal proceedings against her husband did not violate Article 8. The disclosure of her identity and HIV status in the Court of Appeal's published judgment did violate it, and so would an order making the case file public after ten years, if it were carried out. In the United States the Health Insurance Portability and Accountability Act of 1996 led to a federal Privacy Rule, which most health plans, health-care clearing houses and electronically billing health-care providers had to comply with from April 2003. It does not apply to other holders of health information. The GDPR lists health, genetic and biometric data among the "special categories" whose processing is prohibited unless one of a set of conditions applies, such as explicit consent.

Genetic information raises distinctive problems because it is shared with relatives: a disclosure by one person can reveal information about others who have not consented. Researchers have shown that participants in anonymised genomic studies can be re-identified by matching their DNA against public genealogy databases. A 2018 study projected that about 60 per cent of searches for Americans of European descent in such a database would produce a match with a third cousin or closer relative, which could in theory allow the person to be identified. The same year, investigators used this kind of long-range familial search on a consumer genealogy site to identify a suspect in the Golden State Killer case. In the United States the Genetic Information Nondiscrimination Act of 2008 prohibits the use of genetic information in health insurance and employment decisions. Its insurance protections do not extend to life, disability or long-term-care insurance.

=== Privacy in non-human animals ===
Lack of privacy in public spaces, caused by overcrowding, increases health issues in animals, including heart disease and high blood pressure. Also, the stress from overcrowding is connected to an increase in infant mortality rates and maternal stress. The lack of privacy that comes with overcrowding is connected to other issues in animals, which causes their relationships with others to diminish. How they present themselves to others of their species is a necessity in their life, and overcrowding causes the relationships to become disordered.

Some philosophers have argued that non-human animals, too, have interests in privacy. Angie Pepper holds that the human right to privacy protects an interest in shaping relationships by controlling how one presents oneself to others. Drawing on empirical research in animal behaviour, she argues that many sentient animals share that interest, and that it can be violated even when they are unaware of being watched, as with animals on constant display in zoos. The naturalist David Attenborough suggested in 2016 that zoos should let visitors view gorillas through peepholes rather than glass panels, because the animals "value their privacy". Research on the "visitor effect" in zoo primates is broadly consistent with human audiences being a source of stress. The effect varies with species and housing, and in some circumstances it is closer to enrichment.

=== Organisational privacy ===
Government agencies, corporations and other organisations may wish to keep their activities or secrets from other organisations or individuals, and adopt security practices and controls to keep information confidential. They may also seek legal protection for such information. A government may invoke executive privilege or designate information as classified, and a company may protect valuable proprietary information as trade secrets.

==== Privacy management in organisations ====
Organisations also hold personal information about others, and a body of regulation, standards and research addresses how they should govern it. Its common starting point is the set of fair information practices formulated in a 1973 report to the United States Department of Health, Education and Welfare and restated internationally in the 1980 OECD Guidelines. The Guidelines added an "accountability" principle, under which the data controller is responsible for complying with measures that give effect to the other principles. From the 2000s, regulators and scholars increasingly read accountability as requiring organisations to establish internal programmes that put the principles into effect and to be able to demonstrate them. The GDPR codifies this approach. A controller must be able to demonstrate compliance with the data-protection principles (Article 5(2)) and must implement appropriate technical and organisational measures (Article 24), including data protection by design and by default (Article 25). Where processing is likely to result in a high risk, the controller must carry out data protection impact assessments (Article 35), and in specified cases it must designate a data protection officer (Article 37). In Canada, the federal Privacy Commissioner and the Information and Privacy Commissioners of Alberta and British Columbia issued joint guidance in 2012. It describes a privacy management programme as resting on "building blocks" (organisational commitment and programme controls) that are subject to ongoing assessment and revision. Voluntary standards serve similar ends. ISO/IEC 27701, published in 2019, extends the information-security management standards ISO/IEC 27001 and 27002 to privacy information management. The NIST Privacy Framework, published in 2020, presents privacy as a component of enterprise risk management.

Empirical research has examined how such programmes operate in practice. In interviews with chief privacy officers in the United States and four European countries, Kenneth Bamberger and Deirdre Mulligan found that leading practitioners framed privacy less as compliance with legal rules than as the management of consumers' expectations and trust. They argued that this approach owed much to ambiguous legal mandates combined with active regulators and the professionalisation of privacy officers. Ari Ezra Waldman, by contrast, argues that the routines of corporate privacy compliance can redirect the law's protective aims towards the interests of the firm, so that symbolic structures come to stand in for substantive protection. In information-systems research, Smith, Milberg and Burke developed a widely used instrument measuring individuals' concerns about organisational information practices. It has four dimensions: collection, errors, unauthorised secondary use and improper access. Culnan and Armstrong found that when firms observed fair information procedures, consumers were more willing to permit the use of their data. Culnan and Bies analysed the disclosure of personal information as an exchange between consumer and firm that must satisfy considerations of both economic benefit and justice. Some management writers have proposed that a privacy programme succeeds when the interests of an organisation's customers, employees and other stakeholders come into balance with its own use of personal information.

== Value of privacy ==
=== Privacy as social value and human right ===
Political scientists such as Priscilla Regan have criticised accounts that treat privacy solely as an individual interest to be balanced against collective goods. Regan argued that privacy also has common, public and collective value, because it sustains democratic participation and limits the power of government and organisations. In her view, recognising this would strengthen privacy's position in policy-making. David Flaherty's comparative study of data protection in five countries similarly treated privacy protection as a means of controlling the surveillance capacities of the modern state, whose networked databases he saw as the principal threat. More recent work emphasises that the burdens of weak privacy protection fall unequally. Scott Skinner-Thompson argues that marginalised groups are more often required to disclose personal information and more severely harmed by exposure.

Privacy is widely regarded as a fundamental human right whose social value is essential to the functioning of democratic societies. Article 12 of the Universal Declaration of Human Rights provides that "No one shall be subjected to arbitrary interference with his privacy, family, home or correspondence, nor to attacks upon his honour and reputation", and that everyone has the right to the protection of the law against such interference. The communications scholar Leslie Regan Shade argues that the right is necessary for meaningful democratic participation and for human dignity and autonomy, and that privacy policy should therefore be framed around people's rights rather than the needs of the market. Others have asked how the right applies to mass surveillance carried out abroad. The legal scholar Eliza Watt has proposed that a state be treated as exercising "virtual control" over the communications it intercepts, so that its obligations under Article 17 of the International Covenant on Civil and Political Rights would extend to surveillance of people outside its territory.

Richard Posner and Lawrence Lessig focus on the economic aspects of personal information control. Posner criticizes privacy for concealing information, which reduces market efficiency. For Posner, employment is selling oneself in the labour market, which he believes is like selling a product. Any 'defect' in the 'product' that is not reported is fraud. For Lessig, privacy breaches online can be regulated through code and law. Lessig claims "the protection of privacy would be stronger if people conceived of the right as a property right", and that "individuals should be able to control information about themselves".

=== Critiques ===
Some philosophers doubt that privacy is a distinct value at all. On the "reductionist" view of Judith Jarvis Thomson, the "right to privacy" is a cluster of rights, each of which derives from other rights, such as rights over one's property and person, so that nothing is lost by dispensing with the concept. T. M. Scanlon replied that the rights Thomson identified share a common basis in conventional zones within which individuals can be free from observation and intrusion, so privacy remains a useful organising idea. Economic critics, notably Richard Posner, argue that much privacy protection lets people conceal discreditable information that others legitimately need when deciding whether to deal with them.

A communitarian critique, associated with Amitai Etzioni, accepts that privacy is valuable but argues that liberal societies have given it excessive priority over the common good. Etzioni offers public-health measures and the registration of sex offenders as examples where it should give way. Others question whether privacy is attainable at all. The science-fiction author David Brin argued that, because surveillance technology would inevitably spread, societies should seek reciprocal transparency, in which citizens can watch the powerful, rather than attempt to preserve secrecy. A popular objection, that those with "nothing to hide" have nothing to fear from surveillance, has been criticised by Daniel J. Solove. He argues that it assumes privacy concerns only the concealment of wrongdoing and ignores harms such as aggregation, exclusion and the chilling of lawful activity.

Feminist scholars have pointed out that appeals to the privacy of the home and family have historically shielded domestic violence and the subordination of women from public scrutiny. Catharine MacKinnon criticised the privacy rationale of Roe v. Wade on this ground, while Anita L. Allen defended privacy as a good that women have historically been denied.

== History ==
=== Antiquity and religious traditions ===
Distinctions between public and private domains appear in many early societies. In his comparative study, the sociologist Barrington Moore examined conceptions of privacy in classical Athens, in the Hebrew Bible and in ancient China, concluding that some desire for privacy appears in all of them while its content varies with social structure. Aristotle's distinction between two spheres of life, the polis, associated with political life, and the oikos, the household, associated with domestic life, is frequently cited as an early statement of the public–private division in Western thought. Hannah Arendt later drew on the same distinction in her account of the decline of the public realm in modern society.

Religious texts also address privacy and intrusion. The Book of Sirach (Ecclesiasticus) lists "a house to assure privacy" among the basic necessities of life, together with water, bread and clothing. The Quran enjoins believers not to spy on one another (49:12) and not to enter houses other than their own without the occupants' consent (24:27), verses that have informed the treatment of privacy in Islamic jurisprudence. In the Sinosphere, the terms yinsi (隱私) and siyin (私隱) long carried connotations of shameful secrecy, and historians have traced how Confucian and later conceptions of the private (私) and public (公) diverged from Western liberal ones.

=== Early modern and modern Europe ===
Historians of private life in Europe have associated the growth of privacy with changes in domestic architecture, the separation of household from workplace, literacy and the rise of individual religious practice. Historians of early modern England have examined how the household itself combined public and private functions. Jürgen Habermas traced the emergence, in the eighteenth century, of a bourgeois "public sphere" formed by private persons coming together to debate matters of common concern, which presupposed a protected intimate sphere of the family.

Liberal political theory gave the distinction normative force. The English philosopher John Locke's theory of natural rights and the social contract laid groundwork for modern conceptions of individual rights. In the Second Treatise of Government (1689), Locke argued that each person has a property in his own person, and that the natural rights of life, liberty and property precede the state, whose task is to protect them.

Philosophers have taken differing views of the right of private judgement. Georg Wilhelm Friedrich Hegel distinguished Moralität, the individual's private moral judgement, from Sittlichkeit, the rights and obligations defined by an existing social and institutional order. Jeremy Bentham, by contrast, regarded law as necessarily an encroachment on individual liberty, to be justified only by its contribution to general welfare, or utility. John Stuart Mill's On Liberty (1859) argued for protecting individual liberty against both the "tyranny of the majority" and the interference of the state, holding that the only legitimate ground for interfering with an individual's liberty against his will is to prevent harm to others and defending a domain of conduct that "merely concerns himself"; his views have been read as treating privacy as essential to personal development and self-expression.

Discussion of surveillance developed alongside these ideas. In 1791 Bentham proposed the Panopticon, a prison in which inmates could be watched at any time without knowing whether they were being observed, so that the possibility of surveillance would itself shape their behaviour. Michel Foucault later took the Panopticon as a model of a disciplinary power that induces people to conform to rules and regulate their own conduct.

=== The nineteenth and early twentieth centuries ===
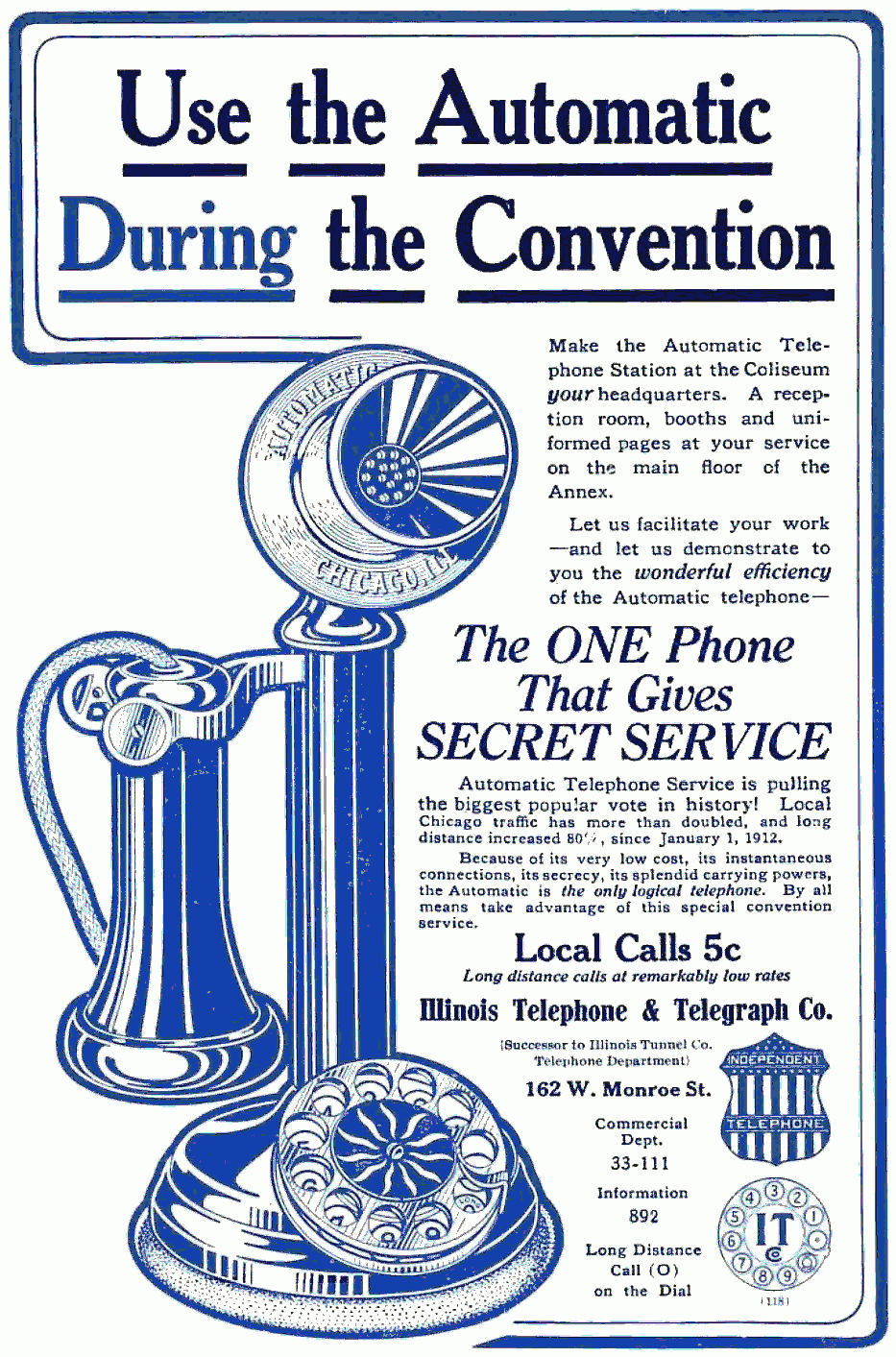
An advertisement for dial telephone service at the 1912 Republican convention in Chicago. Automatic dialling was marketed as "secret" because no operator was needed to connect the call.

As technology has advanced, the ways in which privacy is protected and violated have changed with it. Technologies such as the printing press and, later, the Internet increased the capacity to share information and so created new ways in which privacy could be breached. The expansion of the popular press, cheap portable photography and the telegraph and telephone made the protection of private life a recurrent legal issue in the nineteenth century. Warren and Brandeis's article of 1890, written chiefly in response to the growth of newspapers and photography made possible by new printing technologies, is generally regarded as the first publication advocating a right to privacy in the United States. Courts in the United States gradually recognised various privacy claims in tort, which the legal scholar William Prosser systematised in 1960 into four distinct torts (see below).

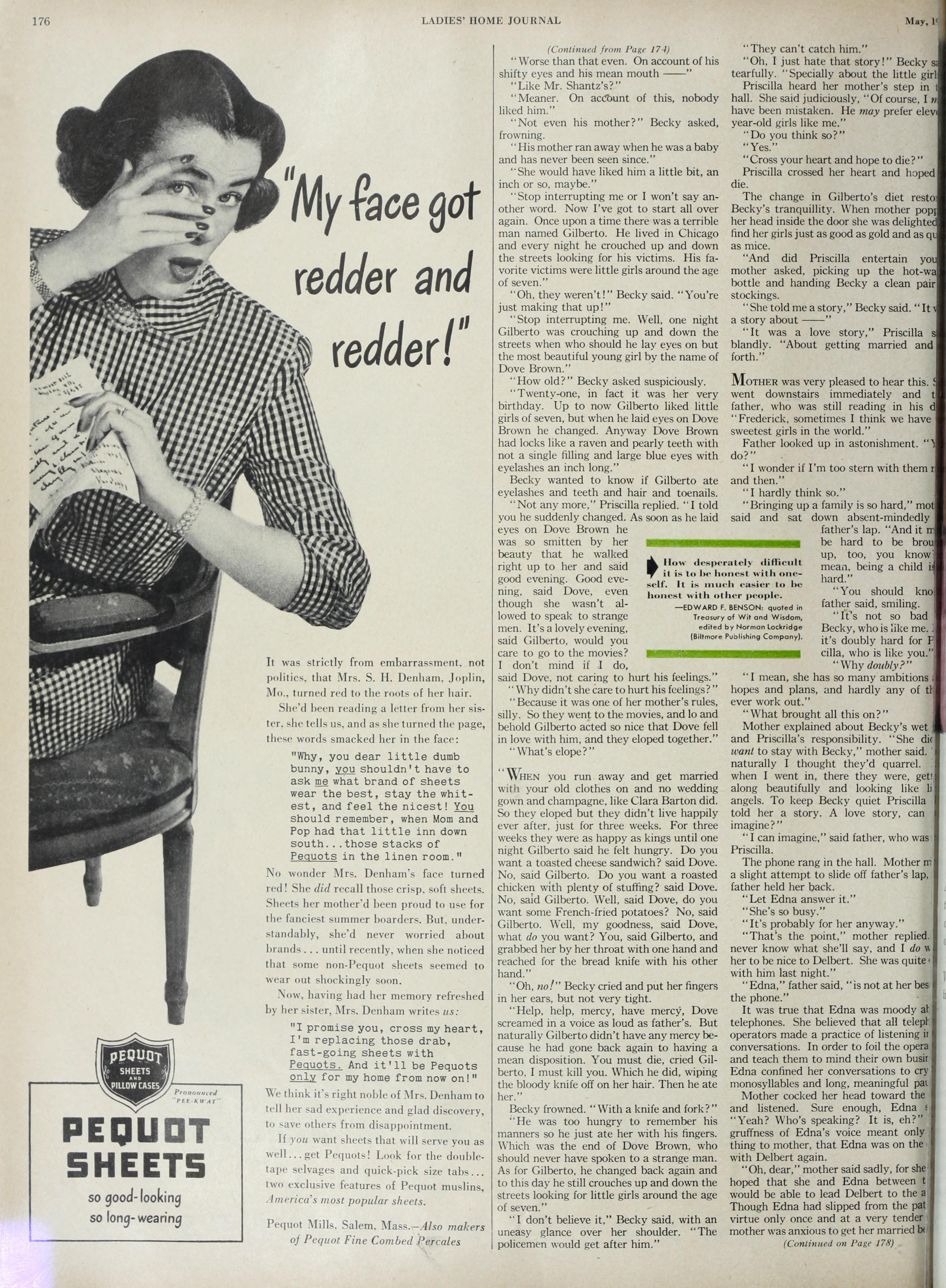
An advertisement in the Ladies' Home Journal (1948), whose copy ends with the suspicion that telephone operators were listening in on calls

The twentieth century added the experience of totalitarian states that relied on systematic surveillance and informants. George Orwell's dystopian novel Nineteen Eighty-Four (1949) depicts the life of Winston Smith in Oceania, a totalitarian state in which the ruling Party, led by Big Brother, maintains its power through mass surveillance and the suppression of free speech and thought; the novel is a sustained commentary on the effects of totalitarianism on privacy and censorship. It became a lasting reference point in debates about surveillance. The technology commentator Kalev Leetaru, for example, has argued that the novel anticipated a world in which large social media companies, rather than governments, monitor users' data and decide what may be said online, ultimately for commercial ends.

=== Computers and data protection ===
From the 1960s, the computerisation of government and commercial records generated widespread public concern about the effect of technology on privacy. In 1964 the journalist Vance Packard warned in his best-selling The Naked Society that privacy was "evaporating". Westin's Privacy and Freedom (1967) documented the new pressures from surveillance technology and argued that, as records were computerised, individuals should be able to determine for themselves how information about them was communicated, a view that laid foundations for modern information privacy law.

Legislatures responded first in Europe. The German state of Hesse enacted the world's first data protection statute in 1970, followed by Sweden's national Data Act in 1973. In the United States, a 1973 report of the Department of Health, Education and Welfare formulated a code of fair information practices, which informed the Privacy Act of 1974. Internationally, the OECD adopted its non-binding Guidelines on the Protection of Privacy and Transborder Flows of Personal Data in 1980, and the Council of Europe opened for signature in 1981 the Convention 108, the first binding international treaty on data protection. In 1983 the German Federal Constitutional Court derived from the Basic Law's guarantees of human dignity and personality a right to "informational self-determination", striking down parts of a planned national census.

=== The Internet era ===
The commercial Internet and mobile computing transformed the scale of personal data processing. The European Union harmonised national laws through the Data Protection Directive of 1995, which was replaced by the General Data Protection Regulation (GDPR) in 2018. In 2013, documents disclosed by the former contractor Edward Snowden revealed the extent of bulk data collection by the United States National Security Agency and its partners, beginning with a court order requiring the telephone company Verizon to hand over its customers' call records on a daily basis. The disclosures prompted litigation, legislative reform and the adoption by the United Nations General Assembly of a resolution on "The right to privacy in the digital age".

== Legal frameworks ==
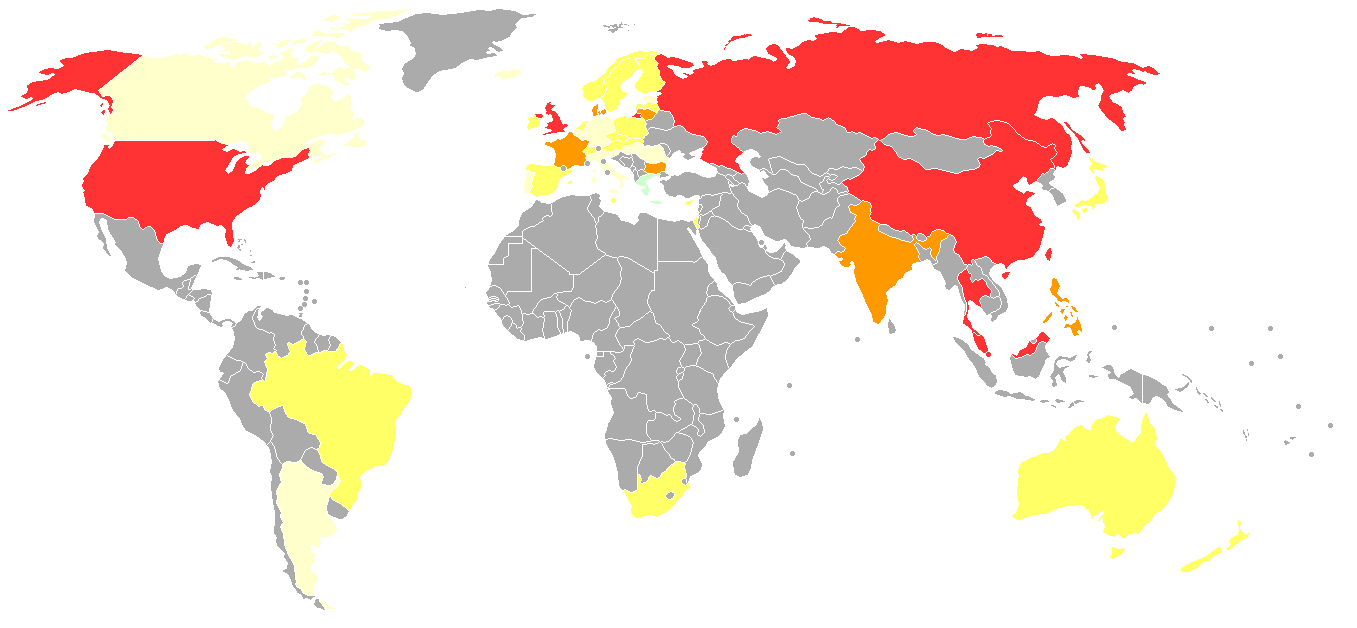
Privacy International's 2007 ranking of privacy protection by country, the last such global survey the organisation published

=== International law ===
Article 12 of the Universal Declaration of Human Rights provides that "No one shall be subjected to arbitrary interference with his privacy, family, home or correspondence, nor to attacks upon his honour and reputation." Article 17 of the International Covenant on Civil and Political Rights gives the guarantee binding force, prohibiting "arbitrary or unlawful interference" with privacy. In 2013 the General Assembly affirmed that the rights people have offline must also be protected online, including the right to privacy; the Human Rights Council subsequently created the mandate of Special Rapporteur on the right to privacy.

Article 8 of the European Convention on Human Rights guarantees "the right to respect for [one's] private and family life, [one's] home and [one's] correspondence", subject to interferences that are in accordance with the law and necessary in a democratic society for specified purposes. The European Court of Human Rights has interpreted it broadly to cover, among other things, the retention of DNA profiles and the bulk interception of communications. The Charter of Fundamental Rights of the European Union distinguishes respect for private and family life (Article 7) from a separate right to the protection of personal data (Article 8).

Other regional frameworks include the APEC Privacy Framework of the Asia-Pacific Economic Cooperation, endorsed in 2004, and the African Union's Convention on Cyber Security and Personal Data Protection (the Malabo Convention), adopted in 2014.

=== Models of regulation ===
Comparative lawyers commonly distinguish between omnibus data protection laws, which apply general principles to the public and private sectors alike, and sectoral regimes, which regulate particular industries or types of data. The European Union exemplifies the first model and the United States the second. James Q. Whitman attributes the difference to "two Western cultures of privacy": a continental European tradition rooted in personal dignity and honour, and an American tradition centred on liberty against the state, particularly within the home. A related policy debate opposes market-based approaches, which rely on notice and individual choice, to consumer-protection approaches, which doubt that individuals have the time or expertise to make informed choices; empirical studies have found, for example, that many online privacy policies demand a reading level beyond that of much of the population.

=== Surveillance and law enforcement ===
Closed-circuit television is widely used by public authorities for surveillance.

The relationship between police powers and privacy has been a central subject of constitutional litigation, particularly as new technologies have enabled forms of monitoring that do not involve physical entry. In Kyllo v. United States (2001), the United States Supreme Court held that using a thermal imaging device to detect heat inside a home was a search requiring a warrant. In United States v. Jones (2012), the Court unanimously held that attaching a GPS tracker to a suspect's vehicle and monitoring its movements for 28 days was a search under the Fourth Amendment; the majority relied on the physical trespass involved, while five Justices indicated in concurring opinions that long-term location monitoring would infringe a reasonable expectation of privacy in any event. The Court did not decide whether a warrant was required, because the government had not argued that the search was reasonable without one.

The European Court of Human Rights reached a different result on comparable facts in Uzun v. Germany (2010). It held that GPS surveillance of a suspect in a series of bomb attacks, lasting about three months, interfered with his private life under Article 8, but that the interference had a sufficient legal basis and was proportionate given the gravity of the offences under investigation; it found no violation. The Court regarded GPS tracking as interfering less with private life than visual or acoustic surveillance or telephone interception.

In Riley v. California (2014) the United States Supreme Court unanimously held that police generally may not search the digital contents of a mobile phone seized at arrest without a warrant, observing that modern phones hold "the privacies of life". In Carpenter v. United States (2018) a majority of five to four held that obtaining historical cell-site location records from a mobile operator is a search that generally requires a warrant, limiting the "third-party doctrine" under which information voluntarily disclosed to businesses had been treated as unprotected.

Bulk surveillance by intelligence agencies has raised analogous questions. Following the Snowden disclosures, the United States Court of Appeals for the Second Circuit held in 2015 that the NSA's bulk collection of telephone records exceeded its statutory authority, and Congress ended the programme in its existing form through the USA Freedom Act later that year. In Big Brother Watch v United Kingdom (2021), the Grand Chamber of the European Court of Human Rights accepted that bulk interception regimes are not in themselves incompatible with the Convention, but found that the British regime lacked adequate "end-to-end safeguards" and violated Article 8.

=== Selected jurisdictions ===
==== Australia ====
The Privacy Act 1988 (Cth) originally regulated the handling of personal information by Commonwealth agencies through a set of Information Privacy Principles. It was later extended to much of the private sector, and the Australian Law Reform Commission reviewed its operation in the 2008 report For Your Information. Implementing many of the report's recommendations, the Privacy Amendment (Enhancing Privacy Protection) Act 2012 replaced the separate public- and private-sector principles with a single set of Australian Privacy Principles. The High Court left open in 2001 whether the common law recognises a tort of invasion of privacy. A statutory cause of action for serious invasions of privacy, enacted by the Privacy and Other Legislation Amendment Act 2024, came into force on 10 June 2025. The Telecommunications (Interception and Access) Amendment (Data Retention) Act 2015 requires telecommunications providers to retain specified metadata about communications, as distinct from their content, for two years.

==== Canada ====
Canada is a federal state in which the provinces and territories follow the common law, with the exception of Quebec, whose private law belongs to the civil law tradition. At the federal level, the Privacy Act governs personal information held by government institutions, and the provinces and territories later enacted their own public-sector legislation. Such statutes generally give individuals rights of access to personal information held about them and to correction of inaccurate information, and prohibit its unauthorised collection, use and disclosure. The Personal Information Protection and Electronic Documents Act (PIPEDA) of 2000 governs the private sector. It applies to commercial activity within a province unless the province has enacted substantially similar legislation and the federal government has exempted it by order, but interprovincial and international transfers of personal information remain subject to PIPEDA. Efforts to reform PIPEDA have drawn on consultations by the Office of the Privacy Commissioner with Canadian academics.

Since PIPEDA provides no private right of action independent of a complaint to the Privacy Commissioner, individuals have also relied on common-law torts such as intrusion upon seclusion and public disclosure of private facts, and in Quebec on the Civil Code, including in class actions. In Jones v Tsige (2012) the Court of Appeal for Ontario recognised the tort of intrusion upon seclusion. Sections 7 and 8 of the Canadian Charter of Rights and Freedoms also protect privacy; section 8, which protects against unreasonable search or seizure, has been interpreted to protect reasonable expectations of privacy and is applied chiefly in criminal proceedings. In Quebec, privacy is protected by articles 3 and 35 to 41 of the Civil Code of Quebec and by section 5 of the Quebec Charter of Human Rights and Freedoms.

==== China ====
China's data-protection law developed first through criminal and sectoral rules. A 2009 amendment to the Criminal Law made it an offence to sell or unlawfully provide citizens' personal information, and the Cybersecurity Law, in force from 1 June 2017, imposed consent and security obligations on network operators. The Civil Code, in force since 1 January 2021, recognises a right to privacy (隐私权, yinsi quan). It defines privacy as "the undisturbed private life of a natural person and his private space, private activities and private information that he does not want to be known to others" (article 1032) and makes separate provision for the protection of personal information (articles 1034–1039).

The Personal Information Protection Law (PIPL), adopted on 20 August 2021 and in force since 1 November 2021, establishes a comprehensive regime covering both private and state bodies. Processing requires consent or another statutory basis, and stricter rules apply to "sensitive" personal information. Transfers abroad generally require a government security assessment, certification or a standard contract, and the Law applies to processing outside China that targets individuals within it. Together with the Data Security Law (in force from 1 September 2021), which governs data in general by reference to its importance to national security and the economy, it forms the core of China's data-governance framework. Commentators have described the Chinese model as combining strong obligations on private companies, broadly modelled on European law, with wide latitude for state access to data.

==== European Union ====
The General Data Protection Regulation, adopted in 2016 and applicable from 25 May 2018, applies to the processing of personal data by public and private bodies within the Union and to organisations outside it that offer goods or services to, or monitor, people in the Union. Processing is lawful only on one of six legal bases, of which consent is one; the others include the performance of a contract, compliance with a legal obligation and the "legitimate interests" of the controller. The regulation grants data subjects rights of access, rectification, erasure and objection, and allows fines of up to €20 million or four per cent of worldwide annual turnover. In 2023 the Irish Data Protection Commission fined Meta €1.2 billion for transferring European users' data to the United States.

The Court of Justice of the European Union has given these rights considerable force. In Google Spain (2014) it held that a search engine could be required to delist results about a person in certain circumstances, a ruling popularly described as establishing a "right to be forgotten". In Digital Rights Ireland (2014) it invalidated the Data Retention Directive, and in Schrems II (2020) it annulled the EU–US "Privacy Shield" arrangement because of the breadth of American surveillance law.

==== Hong Kong ====
Article 30 of the Basic Law provides that "the freedom and privacy of communication of Hong Kong residents shall be protected by law", and article 14 of the Hong Kong Bill of Rights reproduces article 17 of the ICCPR. The Personal Data (Privacy) Ordinance (Cap. 486), enacted in 1995 and in force in its main part since 20 December 1996, was one of the first comprehensive data protection laws in Asia and is enforced by the Privacy Commissioner for Personal Data. Amendments in 2021 created offences directed at "doxxing". In Koo Sze Yiu v Chief Executive (2006), the Court of Final Appeal upheld declarations that the legal basis for covert surveillance by law-enforcement agencies was unconstitutional, suspending them for six months to allow legislation; the Interception of Communications and Surveillance Ordinance (Cap. 589) was enacted later that year. The Law Reform Commission of Hong Kong recommended a statutory tort of invasion of privacy in 2004, but no such tort has been enacted.

==== India ====
In Justice K. S. Puttaswamy v Union of India (2017), a nine-judge bench of the Supreme Court of India unanimously held that privacy is a fundamental right protected by Article 21 and Part III of the Constitution, overruling earlier decisions to the contrary. The case arose from challenges to Aadhaar, the biometric identification scheme launched in 2009. In a separate judgment in 2018, a five-judge bench upheld the scheme by a majority of four to one, but struck down the provision that had permitted private companies to use Aadhaar for authentication. The Digital Personal Data Protection Act, 2023 introduced India's first comprehensive data protection statute.

==== Japan ====
The Constitution of Japan does not refer to privacy, but Japanese courts have derived a right to privacy from article 13, which guarantees respect for individuals and their right to "life, liberty, and the pursuit of happiness". In the 1964 Utage no Ato (『宴のあと』, "After the Banquet") case, concerning a novel by Yukio Mishima, the Tokyo District Court first recognised privacy as a legally protected interest. In 1969 the Supreme Court held that individuals have a freedom, under article 13, not to be photographed by the police without consent or good reason.

The Act on the Protection of Personal Information of 2003, fully in force from April 2005, established a general regime for the private sector. Amendments promulgated in 2015 and fully in force from May 2017 introduced enforceable individual rights and made an independent supervisory authority, the Personal Information Protection Commission (個人情報保護委員会), responsible for overseeing the Act. Further amendments in force from 2022 strengthened individuals' rights and the rules on cross-border transfers.CITEREFDLA_Pipern.d. In January 2019 the European Commission found that Japan ensures an adequate level of protection for personal data transferred from the EU. Together with a reciprocal designation of the EU by Japan, the Commission described the result as "the world's largest area of safe data flows".

==== South Korea ====
Article 17 of the Constitution of South Korea provides that "the privacy of no citizen shall be infringed". In 2012 the Constitutional Court of Korea unanimously held unconstitutional the "real-name verification" requirement, introduced in 2007, under which users of large websites had to verify their identity before posting, finding that it restricted freedom of expression without clear evidence that it had reduced unlawful postings (see below).

==== United Kingdom ====
English law long declined to recognise a general tort of invasion of privacy, a position the House of Lords reaffirmed in Wainwright v Home Office (2003). After the Human Rights Act 1998 gave domestic effect to Article 8 of the European Convention, however, the courts developed the equitable action for breach of confidence into a distinct cause of action for misuse of private information. In Campbell v MGN Ltd (2004) the House of Lords asked whether the claimant had a reasonable expectation of privacy and, if so, balanced that interest against freedom of expression; in Vidal-Hall v Google (2015) the Court of Appeal held that misuse of private information is a tort. Data protection is governed by the Data Protection Act 2018 and the "UK GDPR" retained after Brexit, as amended by the Data (Use and Access) Act 2025, which also provides for the Information Commissioner to be replaced by a corporate Information Commission.

==== United States ====
The United States Constitution does not mention privacy. The Fourth Amendment protects "the right of the people to be secure in their persons, houses, papers, and effects, against unreasonable searches and seizures", which the Supreme Court in Katz v. United States (1967) extended to situations in which a person has a "reasonable expectation of privacy". In Griswold v. Connecticut (1965) the Court found a right of marital privacy in the "penumbras" of several guarantees of the Bill of Rights, and later decisions, including Roe v. Wade (1973), located a right of privacy in the liberty protected by the Due Process Clause. Dobbs v. Jackson Women's Health Organization (2022) overruled Roe. The majority stated that its decision did not cast doubt on precedents not concerning abortion, but Justice Clarence Thomas, concurring, urged the Court to reconsider its substantive due process precedents, including Griswold.

There is no comprehensive federal data protection statute. The Privacy Act of 1974 applies only to federal agencies, and private-sector data is regulated by sector-specific laws such as the Fair Credit Reporting Act (1970), the Health Insurance Portability and Accountability Act (1996), the Children's Online Privacy Protection Act (1998) and the Gramm–Leach–Bliley Act (1999), and by the Federal Trade Commission's powers over unfair and deceptive practices. In 2019 the Commission imposed a penalty of US$5 billion on Facebook for violating an earlier privacy order. Several states have enacted general consumer privacy laws, beginning with the California Consumer Privacy Act of 2018, and Illinois's Biometric Information Privacy Act of 2008 requires informed written consent before private entities collect biometric identifiers such as fingerprints or face geometry. In a report on his 2017 visit, published in 2021, the UN Special Rapporteur on the right to privacy, Joseph Cannataci, recommended that safeguards and remedies for foreign intelligence be raised to the standard applying to domestic intelligence, stating that he did not accept the approach of any country that applies lower privacy protection to non-nationals.

==== Other jurisdictions ====
The Constitution of Brazil declares that "the privacy, private life, honor and image of people are inviolable" and the Constitution of South Africa that "everyone has the right to privacy". By the 2010s, comprehensive data protection legislation had spread well beyond Europe to many states in Asia, Latin America and Africa.

== Privacy harms ==
In 1960 William Prosser argued that American privacy case law in fact comprised four distinct torts:

1. intrusion upon a person's seclusion or solitude, or into his private affairs;
2. public disclosure of embarrassing private facts;
3. publicity that places a person in a false light in the public eye; and
4. appropriation, for the defendant's advantage, of the person's name or likeness.

Courts in most American states continue to recognise these four torts.

Building on Prosser's scheme, Solove proposed a broader taxonomy of sixteen kinds of activity that cause privacy problems, grouped into four categories:

1. Information collection: surveillance and interrogation.
2. Information processing: aggregation, identification, insecurity, secondary use (use of data for purposes other than those for which it was collected without the subject's consent) and exclusion (failure to let people know about or participate in the handling of their data).
3. Information dissemination: breach of confidentiality, disclosure, exposure, increased accessibility, blackmail, appropriation and distortion.
4. Invasion: intrusion and decisional interference, that is, governmental interference with a person's decisions about private matters.

Solove, building from Prosser and other historical precedents, argues that a taxonomy of problems is more useful to law and policy than an abstract definition, because it identifies the specific activities that cause harm and the distinct interests they affect.

=== Information collection ===
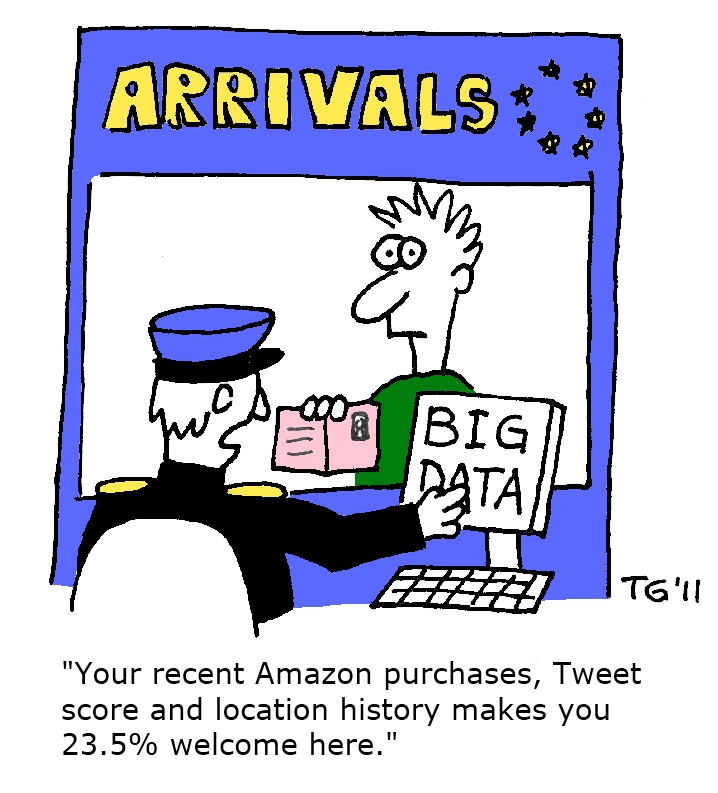
Governments and corporations collect personal data on a large scale to inform their decisions.

In Solove's taxonomy, information collection comprises surveillance, the watching, listening to or recording of a person's activities, and interrogation, the pressuring of a person to divulge information. Commercial collection has become a prominent concern. Companies such as Google and Meta collect large amounts of personal data through their services and platforms, including browsing habits, search histories, location information and communications, and analyse and aggregate the data into detailed user profiles used for targeted advertising. Asunción Esteve argues that these practices often take place without meaningful user consent, leave individuals with little control over how their information is used, and raise significant ethical and legal concerns under European and American data protection law.

Facial recognition and other biometric technologies allow the collection of identifying information at a distance and without the subject's knowledge, and are the subject of research into privacy-preserving alternatives. Legislatures have begun to regulate them specifically: Illinois requires consent for the commercial collection of biometric identifiers, and the European Union's Artificial Intelligence Act prohibits, subject to narrow exceptions, the use of real-time remote biometric identification in publicly accessible spaces for law-enforcement purposes.

=== Information processing ===
Solove's second category concerns the handling of data already collected. Information that is harmless in isolation can become harmful when combined: aggregation assembles scattered pieces into a profile, and identification links data to a particular person, for example by re-identifying supposedly anonymous records. Insecurity refers to careless protection of stored data that exposes people to data breaches and identity theft. Secondary use is the use of data for purposes other than those for which it was collected, without the subject's consent. Exclusion is the failure to let people know about, or take part in, the handling of their data.

=== Information dissemination ===
Count not him among your friends who will retail your privacies to the world. — Publilius Syrus

The third category covers the spreading or threatened spreading of information. Breach of confidentiality betrays a relationship of trust. Disclosure reveals true information that harms a person's reputation or standing. Exposure reveals another's nudity, grief or bodily functions, and increased accessibility makes already available information far easier to obtain. Blackmail threatens disclosure, appropriation uses a person's identity for another's ends, and distortion spreads false or misleading information about a person.

=== Invasion ===
The fourth category of invasion does not depend on information at all. Intrusion disturbs a person's solitude or tranquillity, whether or not anything is learned. Decisional interference is governmental incursion into a person's decisions about private matters, such as those protected in the American contraception and abortion cases.

In 2019, contract workers for Apple and Amazon reported that, in order to improve the companies' automated speech recognition software, they had to keep listening to "intimate moments", including confidential medical information and sexual activities, recorded by the companies' smart speakers.

== Internet and digital technology ==
The Internet and the technologies built on it enable new forms of social interaction at ever greater speed and scale. Because the computer networks that underlie the Internet raise many novel security problems, discussion of privacy online is often conflated with security. Ari Ezra Waldman argues that technology companies have exploited this conflation, recasting their privacy obligations as a matter of security and procedural regulatory compliance, while the data broker industry has lobbied to limit regulatory requirements. Shoshana Zuboff characterises the business model of the largest platforms as "surveillance capitalism", in which behavioural data are extracted to predict and influence conduct.

The Internet's effect on privacy includes the many ways in which computational technology, and the entities that control it, can subvert users' expectations of privacy. The right to be forgotten, for example, responds both to the technical ability to store and search vast quantities of data and to the expectations of users who share information online without anticipating that it will be retained indefinitely. Ignacio Cofone argues that harms such as revenge porn and deepfakes are not merely individual, because they depend both on the ability to obtain images without consent and on social and economic infrastructure that disseminates them widely, and that the individual-consent model is ill suited to harms that are often collective, cumulative and hard to foresee. Advocacy groups such as the Cyber Civil Rights Initiative and the Electronic Frontier Foundation accordingly argue that addressing these harms requires both technical measures, such as encryption and anonymity, and legal regulation restricting corporate and governmental power.

The Internet began as a government and academic project, but from the 1990s private corporations took over much of its hardware and software, and most Internet infrastructure is now owned and operated by for-profit companies. As a result, governments' ability to protect their citizens' privacy online lies largely in regulating the companies that handle communications and personal data, and in some jurisdictions such regulation is confined to particular groups, such as children, or particular industries, such as consumer reporting agencies.

=== Social networking ===
Several social networking services are among the most visited websites in the world. Facebook, the largest, had about 2.7 billion monthly active users in 2020. Information posted on such services can be preserved indefinitely: in 2010 the United States Library of Congress announced that it would acquire and permanently store the entire archive of public Twitter posts since 2006.

A review of scholarship on how individuals value privacy on social networking services concluded that adults seem to be more concerned about potential privacy threats than younger users, that "policy makers should be alarmed by a large part of users who underestimate risks of their information privacy", and that "traditional one-dimensional privacy approaches fall short" in this setting. The risk is compounded by research showing that sensitive traits can be inferred from a wide range of digital footprints: a study of 58,000 volunteers found that Facebook "likes" could be used to predict sexual orientation, ethnicity, religious and political views, personality and intelligence with substantial accuracy.

Social-media information can also affect employment. Rosen reported a Microsoft study finding that 75 per cent of recruiters and human-resources professionals in the United States researched candidates online, using search engines, social networking and photo-sharing sites, personal websites, blogs and Twitter, and that 70 per cent had rejected candidates on the basis of information found online. Many job-seekers have accordingly sought to manage their privacy settings and online reputations, and the practice has prompted litigation against both social media services and employers.

Selfies became a prominent form of online self-presentation in the 2010s; in 2013 a search of Instagram for the hashtag #selfie returned more than 23 million results, and #me 51 million. The cultural theorist Henry Giroux has argued that the practice is entangled with corporate and state surveillance, which turns self-exposure into a source of data. A study of 3,763 users found that women generally had greater privacy concerns than men about posting selfies, and that privacy concerns predicted lower selfie-posting activity.

==== Online harassment ====
An invasion of privacy can be disseminated widely and quickly over the Internet, and where social media services and other online communities do not invest in content moderation, it can expose people to harassment of far greater volume and intensity than would otherwise be possible. Citron identifies the non-consensual distribution of intimate images, video voyeurism and sextortion as invasions of sexual privacy whose harms are magnified by networked technologies, as in the cases that preceded the suicide of Amanda Todd and the suicide of Tyler Clementi. Where a person's location or other sensitive information is published through "Doxxing", harassment may escalate to physical harm such as stalking or swatting. Doxxing has been made a criminal offence in some jurisdictions, including Hong Kong.

Measures against online harassment can themselves curtail privacy and freedom of speech, by removing anonymity or by enabling law enforcement to obtain information without a search warrant. After Amanda Todd's death, members of the Canadian Parliament debated an anti-bullying motion; when a later cyberbullying bill was considered, Todd's mother, Carol Todd, told a parliamentary committee that she opposed its provisions for warrantless access to personal data, stating "I don't want to see our children victimized again by losing privacy rights."

Such measures have not always been shown to reduce harassment. South Korea introduced a real-name registration system for online commenters in 2007; a study by the Korea Communications Commission reportedly found that it reduced malicious comments by only 0.9 per cent, and in December 2011 the Commission announced plans to scrap it, before the Constitutional Court struck it down in 2012. An empirical analysis of the policy by Daegon Cho, Soodong Kim and Alessandro Acquisti, using a large dataset of Korean postings, was reported to have found that the requirement chiefly affected light users, while heavy users, who posted most comments, were largely unaffected, and that the frequency of expletives rose among some groups of users.

In the United States, there is no federal law specifically prohibiting bullying, although federal civil-rights laws prohibit harassment based on protected characteristics such as race, national origin, sex and disability. State laws vary, and some define harassment broadly: Florida's definition of cyberbullying, for example, includes "any use of data or computer software" that "has the effect of substantially disrupting the orderly operation of a school".

=== Location-based services and location privacy ===
Mobile devices increasingly facilitate location tracking, which creates privacy problems because a user's location and preferences constitute personal information whose improper use violates the user's privacy. A study of mobility data for 1.5 million people by Yves-Alexandre de Montjoye and colleagues at the Massachusetts Institute of Technology found that four approximate points in space and time were sufficient to identify 95 per cent of individuals uniquely, and that this held even when the resolution of the data was reduced, so that coarse or blurred datasets provide little protection.

Several methods to protect privacy in location-based services have been proposed, including anonymising servers and the deliberate blurring of location information. Researchers have also proposed ways of quantifying privacy, for example in terms of entropy, so as to balance the benefit of accurate location information against the risk to privacy.

Several controversies have concerned the handling of location data. In 2017 the weather service AccuWeather was reported to be sending users' location data to Reveal Mobile, a company that monetises location data, even when users had disabled location sharing within the application. In the same year a flaw in the application programming interface of McDonald's McDelivery application in India exposed personal data, including home addresses, of 2.2 million users.

Large American technology companies have faced congressional scrutiny over such practices. In 2011 Senator Al Franken wrote to Steve Jobs after researchers found that iPhones and iPads stored an unencrypted log of approximate user locations. Apple attributed the practice to a software bug, but Justin Brookman of the Center for Democracy and Technology said: "I'm glad that they are fixing what they call bugs, but I take exception with their strong denial that they track users." In 2020 the State of Arizona sued Google, alleging that it had misled users and continued to collect their location information after they believed they had disabled location tracking.

=== Advertising and data brokers ===
The Internet has become a major advertising medium; digital advertising accounted for roughly half of global advertising expenditure in 2019. Although websites can sell advertising space without tracking users, for example through contextual advertising, advertising intermediaries such as Facebook and Google have promoted behavioural advertising, supplying code that website owners embed to track visitors through HTTP cookies and similar techniques. Tracking data are also traded among third parties as part of the mass surveillance industry, and with the spread of smartphones, software development kits from data brokers have been embedded in mobile applications, contributing to a digital advertising industry worth some US$350 billion.

Privacy scandals such as the Facebook–Cambridge Analytica data scandal, in which a political consultancy obtained data on Facebook users through a third-party application, made digital privacy a central concern for many users and formed part of the conduct addressed by the Federal Trade Commission's 2019 penalty. In 2021 Apple began requiring applications to ask users' permission before tracking them across other companies' applications, a change that reshaped the mobile advertising market; competition lawyers have argued that the policy may also entrench Apple's own position, and it became the subject of complaints to competition authorities in France and Germany. Google proposed to replace third-party cookies with "Federated Learning of Cohorts" (FLoC), which grouped users by browsing interests and which Google presented as less harmful to privacy. Critics argued that it would itself facilitate fingerprinting and discrimination, and the proposal attracted regulatory scrutiny; in 2022 Google replaced it with a "Topics" interface.

=== Metadata and inference ===
The ability to search for and compile information about individuals online has expanded dramatically. Directly observed behaviour, such as browsing logs, search queries or the contents of a public Facebook profile, can be processed automatically to infer secondary information about a person, such as sexual orientation, political and religious views, ethnicity, substance use, intelligence and personality. Communications metadata, information about who communicated with whom, when, where and for how long, as distinct from the content of the communication, can be similarly revealing. A study of telephone metadata contributed by volunteers found that it allowed researchers to infer sensitive information, including medical conditions, and to re-identify individuals with relative ease. Such findings undermine the distinction between "personal" and "anonymous" data, and between content and metadata, on which many legal regimes, including data-retention laws, have relied.

=== Artificial intelligence ===
Machine-learning systems intensify several existing privacy concerns. Their development typically depends on very large datasets, often assembled by collecting publicly accessible material from the web without the knowledge of the people it concerns. The company Clearview AI, for example, built a facial-recognition service for law enforcement from billions of images scraped from social media and other sites. Data-protection authorities in France, Italy, Greece and the Netherlands later found that its processing breached the GDPR and imposed fines of up to €30.5 million. The EU's Artificial Intelligence Act now prohibits the creation or expansion of facial-recognition databases through the untargeted scraping of facial images from the internet or CCTV footage.

Trained models can themselves leak personal data: researchers have shown that large language models can be induced to reproduce verbatim passages of their training data, including names, contact details and other personal information. The inferences such systems draw (see above) may also be inaccurate in ways that fall unevenly. An audit of commercial facial-analysis systems found that their error rates in classifying gender were as high as 34.7 per cent for darker-skinned women, compared with at most 0.8 per cent for lighter-skinned men. The use of facial recognition in public spaces is discussed above.

Generative models can also fabricate realistic images, video or audio of identifiable people, known as deepfakes. These extend the harms of appropriation and distortion described above. A 2019 report by the detection company Deeptrace found that 96 per cent of the deepfake videos it identified online were non-consensual pornography, almost all of it depicting women. Legislatures have begun to respond. The EU's AI Act requires those who deploy AI systems to disclose that deepfake content has been artificially generated or manipulated. In the United Kingdom, creating a purported intimate image of another person without consent has been an offence since February 2026. In the United States, the TAKE IT DOWN Act of 2025 makes it a federal crime to publish non-consensual intimate images, including computer-generated ones, and requires platforms to remove them within 48 hours of a valid request.

== Privacy attitudes and behaviours ==
=== The privacy paradox ===
The "privacy paradox" refers to the observed discrepancy between people's stated concern for privacy and their apparently careless disclosure of personal information, particularly online. The term was used as early as 1998, but acquired its current sense around 2000. In 2006 Susan B. Barnes used it to describe young people's extensive self-disclosure on social networking sites despite their expressed concerns, and to describe the ambiguous boundary between private and public space on social media.

The evidence is mixed. Some studies have found little relationship between concern and behaviour, but others have found significant and at times strong correlations between privacy concerns and information-sharing behaviour, a meta-analysis of 166 studies found a small but significant relationship between privacy concerns and both information sharing and the use of protective measures, and a systematic review concluded that the paradox is better understood as a set of distinct phenomena than as a general law.

Several explanations have been proposed for the gap that does exist. According to research on the attitude–behaviour gap, attitudes and behaviour are in general only loosely related. In the context of privacy, users may lack awareness of the risks and of the audiences to which their information is exposed, and may underestimate the harm of disclosure. Others attribute the mismatch to limited technological literacy and to the design of services, which make disclosure easy and protection difficult: users may not know how to change default settings even though they care about their privacy. The psychologists Sonja Utz and Nicole C. Krämer have shown that the paradox can arise when users must trade privacy concerns off against impression management. Others question whether the behaviour is paradoxical at all, arguing that people disclose information because participation in contemporary social and economic life requires it, and that the term obscures the structural conditions under which choices are made.

Mobile computing illustrates these difficulties. Users of applications generally know little about how their personal data are used and are often unable to interpret the information that application providers supply about collection and use. Mobile applications are often designed to prompt rapid, automatic decisions taken without assessing risk; safeguards are often hard to find when applications are downloaded and installed; and even where protective mechanisms exist, users may lack the knowledge or experience to use them. Other research finds that users choosing applications are swayed far more by cost, functionality, design, ratings and reviews than by the permissions requested.

=== The privacy calculus ===
The "privacy calculus" model holds that disclosure decisions reflect a weighing of perceived risks against expected benefits. The model has been extended to electronic commerce, where trust and perceived benefits were found to offset privacy concerns in decisions to transact online. Critics note that the model assumes a degree of information and rationality that users frequently lack, and that it may legitimise practices in which privacy is traded for small or illusory benefits.

=== The economics of privacy ===
==== Economic theories ====
Posner and Lawrence Lessig have both analysed the control of personal information in economic terms, although they reach opposite conclusions. Posner criticises privacy for allowing people to conceal information and so reducing the efficiency of markets: in his account, a person seeking employment is selling himself or herself in the labour market much as a seller markets a product, and the concealment of a material "defect" resembles fraud. Lessig argues that privacy online can be regulated both through law and through the architecture of software ("code"), and that "the protection of privacy would be stronger if people conceived of the right as a property right", so that individuals could control information about themselves.

==== Valuation of personal data ====
The willingness to incur a privacy risk appears to be driven by a complex array of factors, including attitudes to risk, the value a person places on private information, and general attitudes to privacy, which are typically measured by surveys. One experiment designed to determine the monetary value of several types of personal information found that people placed relatively low values on it, and another study suggests that people value their browsing history at about the price of a cheap meal. Providing personal data may bring not only monetary returns but also greater ease of use, for example in voluntary interactions with public services. Although some commentators have argued that valuing data properly would require a "stock-market for personal information", the data broker industry regularly prices such data as it is traded between companies and governments.

Users are not always given the tools to act on their professed privacy concerns, and are sometimes willing to trade private information for convenience, functionality or financial gain, even when the gains are very small. One study found that attitudes to privacy risk do not appear to depend on whether privacy is already under threat. Users are not always given the tools to act on their professed privacy concerns, and are sometimes willing to trade private information for convenience, functionality or financial gain, even when the gains are very small. One study found that attitudes to privacy risk do not appear to depend on whether privacy is already under threat.

Andréa Belliger and David J. Krieger suggest that the privacy paradox should be regarded not as a paradox but as a privacy dilemma for services that cannot exist without users sharing private data. Other evidence suggests that users are often not told what is collected at all. Voice assistants were found to send users' recordings to human reviewers, and the State of Arizona alleged that Google continued to collect location data after users had turned off location history.

== Protecting privacy ==
=== Technical measures ===
Encryption protects the confidentiality of communications and stored data. End-to-end encryption, in which only the communicating parties hold the keys, is now widely used in messaging services; proposals to require "exceptional access" for law enforcement have been criticised by security researchers on the ground that any such mechanism would create vulnerabilities exploitable by others. Anonymity networks such as Tor route traffic through several relays so that no single relay can link a user to the destination of his or her communications. Differential privacy provides a mathematical guarantee that the output of a statistical analysis reveals little about any individual in the dataset, and has been adopted by statistical agencies and technology companies.

=== Privacy by design ===
"Privacy by design", a concept developed by the Ontario Information and Privacy Commissioner Ann Cavoukian, holds that privacy should be built into systems from the outset and set as the default, rather than added afterwards. Its principles call for protection to be proactive rather than remedial, anticipating privacy-invasive events before they occur. That also implies for data to be protected throughout its life cycle, from collection to disposal. The GDPR gives the idea legal force by requiring controllers to implement "data protection by design and by default".

=== Notice and choice ===
Much privacy law relies on "notice and choice": organisations disclose their practices in privacy policies, and individuals decide whether to accept them. Researchers have questioned whether this model can work. McDonald and Cranor estimated that reading the privacy policies of every website an American visits in a year would take about 201 hours per person. Solove has argued that "privacy self-management" through consent fails because of cognitive limits, the sheer number of decisions involved and the difficulty of assessing future harms from aggregated data. He concludes that the law should regulate the substance of data practices directly as well as how they are disclosed.

=== Individual and collective action ===
Individuals can reduce their exposure by limiting what they disclose, adjusting privacy settings and using protective tools. Researchers have stressed the limits of individual self-help, however, where services are designed to encourage disclosure and consent processes are complex. Privacy advocacy groups, such as the Electronic Frontier Foundation, Privacy International and the Electronic Privacy Information Center, have therefore combined public campaigns, litigation and technical expertise to influence law and corporate practice. Colin Bennett has described them as a distinct transnational network that has helped shape the global politics of surveillance.

== See also ==
- Civil liberties
- Contextual integrity
- Data protection
- Digital identity
- Expectation of privacy
- Global surveillance
- Identity theft
- Privacy policy
- Privacy software
- Transparency
- Visual privacy
