= Kerem Albayrak =

IT consultant

- Born: 26 March 1997 (age 29); Istanbul, Türkiye
- Occupation: IT consultant

Kerem Albayrak (born 26 March 1997) is an IT consultant from London. He received wider media coverage in connection with a 2017 Apple Inc. iCloud case, which concluded in December 2019 when he pleaded guilty to blackmail and computer misuse offences and received a suspended sentence.

== Career ==
Albayrak has been described as working in technology consulting and software development. His professional field relates to information technology, cybersecurity and data protection, subjects also relevant to digital governance, public policy and the regulation of technology companies.

== 2017 Apple iCloud case ==
In March 2017, Albayrak contacted Apple claiming to hold login details for a large number of iCloud accounts. Reports said he requested payment in exchange for deleting the data and stated that accounts would otherwise be reset.

Apple referred the matter to law enforcement. In the United Kingdom, the investigation was handled by the National Crime Agency's National Cyber Crime Unit, which arrested Albayrak at his home in North London in March 2017 and seized digital devices.

Investigators found that Apple's systems had not been compromised. The credentials referred to in the case were found to have come largely from previously leaked third-party databases, and many of the accounts were inactive.

In December 2019, Albayrak pleaded guilty at Southwark Crown Court to blackmail, having previously admitted two offences under the Computer Misuse Act 1990. He was sentenced on 20 December 2019 to a two-year prison sentence suspended for two years, 300 hours of unpaid work and a six-month electronic curfew.

The case concerned issues also addressed in wider discussions of cybercrime, corporate cybersecurity responsibilities, international law enforcement cooperation and the protection of personal information in digital services.
