= Adel Hassan Mohammed =

Sudanese Minister of Communication

- Minister: of Communications and Digital Transformation

Personal details
- Died: 7 March 2025 (aged 59)

Adel Hassan Mohammed Hussein was a Sudanese politician and the former Minister of Communications and Digital Transformation.

== Political career ==
During his time as a minister, he signed the African Union Convention on Cybersecurity and Personal Data Protection as a representative of the Government of Sudan in 2023. He also signed a memorandum of understanding with the Ethiopian Ministry of Innovation and Technology to promote digital-friendly relationship between Ethiopia and Sudan. He died on 7 March 2025 after a brief illness.
