= Data Protection Act =

Data Protection Act may refer to:

- Data Protection Act, 2012 (Ghana)
- Data Protection Act 2018 (United Kingdom)
- The now-superseded Data Protection Act 1998 and Data Protection Act 1984 (United Kingdom)
- Personal Data Protection Act (Sri Lanka)
