= Data protection =

Data protection may refer to:

- Information privacy, also known as data privacy
- Data security
- Data Protection Act (disambiguation)
- General Data Protection Regulation (GDPR)
