= Nothing to Hide =

The Nothing to hide argument is a privacy-related argument.

Nothing to hide may also refer to:

== Books ==
- Nothing to Hide: The False Tradeoff Between Privacy and Security, a book by Daniel J. Solove
- Nothing to Hide: A Dancer's Life, the autobiography of Robert La Fosse

== Film and TV ==
- Nothing to Hide (1981 film), a 1981 adult film directed by Anthony Spinelli
- Nothing to Hide (2018 film), also known as Le Jeu, a 2018 French film directed by Fred Cavayé
- "Nothing to Hide" (Heroes), a 2006 TV episode
- "Nothing to Hide" (My Hero), a 2005 TV episode
- "Nothing to Hide" (A Touch of Frost), a 1994 TV episode

== Music ==
=== Albums ===
- Nothing to Hide (album), a 2000 album by the band In My Eyes
- Nothing to Hide, a 2005 album by JD & the Straight Shot

=== Songs ===
- "Nothing to Hide", a song by Chris Montez
- "Nothing to Hide", a 1971 song by Tommy James
- "Nothing to Hide", a song by Harpo
- "Nothing to Hide", a song by Pussycat
- "Nothing to Hide", a song by Richard Marx from Paid Vacation

== Other uses ==
- Nothing to Hide campaign, a 2009 TV advertising campaign for Air New Zealand
- Nothing to Hide (magic show), a theatrical magic show created and performed by Derek DelGaudio and Helder Guimaraes
- Nothing to Hide, a 2013 video game prototype by Nicky Case
