= Privacy and Freedom =

1967 book by Alan F. Westin

- Title page for Privacy and Freedom (1967)
- Author: Alan F. Westin
- Language: English
- Subject: Privacy
- Publisher: Atheneum
- Publication date: 1967
- Publication place: United States
- Media type: Print (hardcover · paperback)
- Pages: 487
- Dewey Decimal: 340
- LC Class: KF1262 .W4

Privacy and Freedom is a foundational work of legal theory by the US professor Alan Westin first published in 1967 that defined the need for information privacy against a growing context of issues raised by computing power and data. Cybersecurity and privacy professor Peter Swire wrote that even the title of the work itself helped to define the privacy field. Decades after its initial publication, Privacy and Freedom was still considered a "canonical" text. According to privacy scholar Daniel J. Solove in 2015, "Privacy and Freedom remains one of the most comprehensive and electrifying accounts of the concept and value of privacy yet written."

== History ==
Concepts discussed in Privacy and Freedom were initially seeded by a Special Committee on Science and Law organized by the Association of the Bar of the City of New York in 1959. Formal study around the area was proposed in 1962.

== Objective ==
The book aims to address a need, which according to Westin, is not to document privacy-invading practices in US society due to increased scientific surveillance, but:

...to move from public awareness of the problem to a sensitive discussion of what can be done to protect privacy in an age when so many forces of science, technology, environment, and society press against it from all sides.

To fulfill this need, Westin explores four topics within the work: (1) the definition of privacy with a description of its psychological, sociological and political dimensions, (2) new techniques of surveillance, including their use and future implications, (3) reactions by American society to the new techniques, and (4) a discussion of how US law had up until that time "dealt with the issue of privacy and surveillance."
