= Nothing to Hide (book) =

First edition

Nothing to Hide: The False Tradeoff Between Privacy and Security is a book written by Daniel J. Solove regarding the nothing to hide argument regarding privacy. It was published by Yale University Press in 2011.

== Summary ==
The book, written for a general audience, includes some material that had been adapted by law review articles written by Solove. Raymond G. Kessler wrote in the Law and Politics Book Review that "the average reader may find some discussions of the law difficult to follow." The book has twenty one chapters in four parts. The parts are "How We Should Assess and Balance the Values of Privacy and Security", "How the Law Should Address Matters of National Security", "How the Constitution Should Protect Privacy" and "How the Law Should Cope With Changing Technology".

== Reviews ==
Tony Doyle wrote in a book review published in the Journal of Value Inquiry that "Overwhelmingly Nothing to Hide is a carefully argued, hysteria-free book" and that the author "makes a strong case for the profound social value of privacy, the siege it is currently under, and how to preserve it." Woodrow Hartzog wrote in the Michigan Law Review that the thesis of his book review is "Solove's polemic is a strong and desperately needed collection of frames that counterbalances the "nothing to hide" argument and other refrains so often used in privacy disputes." J.M. Keller wrote in Choice: Current Reviews for Academic Libraries that the book is "Interesting for those with a passing interest in privacy, security, or legal rhetoric, yet well researched enough to recommend to privacy and security scholars."

Delmus E. Williams of the Journal of Academic Librarianship argues that while Solove "writes well" and "offers solid support for those who would argue that we need more protection for personal privacy" he argues that the book "does not claim to a balanced, and thoughtful readers will want to find other sources if they hope to understand counter arguments." Raymond G. Kessler wrote in the Law and Politics Book Review that "Being so short, some readers might find it wanting in details, examples and explanations. However, this work is one very, very, good place to start."
