= Paul M. Schwartz =

Author and law professor

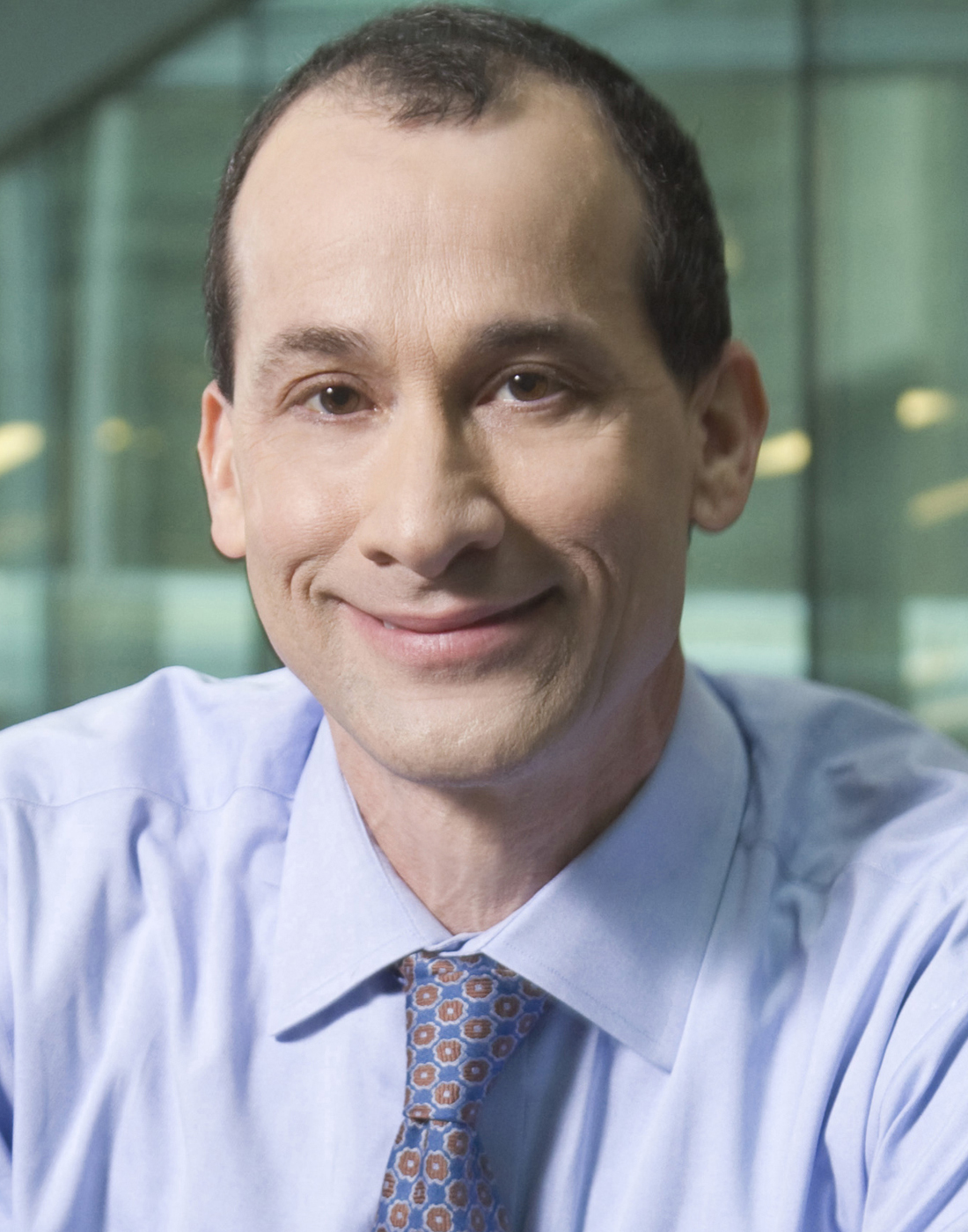
- Born: 1959 (age 65–66)
- Education: Brown University (BA); Yale University (JD)
- Occupation: Law professor
- Title: Jefferson E. Peyser Professor of Law
- Website: http://www.paulschwartz.net

Paul Schwartz (born 1959) is an American legal scholar who specializes in information privacy law. He is the Jefferson E. Peyser Professor at the UC Berkeley School of Law and a director of the Berkeley Center for Law and Technology. He was formerly the Anita and Stuart Subotnick Professor of Law at Brooklyn Law School from 1998 to 2004.

Schwartz has written many books, including the leading casebook Information Privacy Law, and the distilled guide Privacy Law Fundamentals, each with Daniel Solove.

== Research and teaching ==
Schwartz's research centres around the legal and policy implications of data mining, security breaches, and spyware. Together with Daniel J. Solove, Schwartz has re-introduced and systematized the concept of personally identifiable information in privacy law. A special focus of his work has been comparative law and differences in the privacy law of the European Union and the United States. He teaches information privacy, intellectual property, and tort law.

== Academic career ==
Paul Schwartz graduated from Brown University and Yale Law School, where he served as a senior editor of the Yale Law Journal. He was the Anita and Stuart Subotnick Professor of Law at Brooklyn Law School from 1998 to 2004. He joined the Berkeley Law faculty in 2006. He is co-reporter of the American Law Institute’s Restatement of Privacy Law Principles. He is a member of the organizing committee of the Privacy and Security Forum and the Privacy Law Salon. He is co-reporter of the American Law Institute's Restatement of Information Privacy Principles.

== Selected publications ==
=== Books ===
- Paul M. Schwartz, & Daniel J. Solove, Privacy Law Fundamentals, IAPP, 2015
- Paul M. Schwartz, & Daniel J. Solove, Information Privacy Law, Aspen Publishers, 5th ed. 2015
- Paul M. Schwartz, & Daniel J. Solove, Privacy, Information, and Technology, Aspen Publishers, 3d ed. 2011
- Paul M. Schwartz, & Daniel J. Solove, Privacy and the Media, Aspen Publishers, 2009
- Joel R. Reidenberg, & Paul M. Schwartz, On-line Services and Data Protection and Privacy: Regulatory Responses, Brussels, 1998
- Joel R. Reidenberg, & Paul M. Schwartz, Data Privacy Law, Michie Publishing, 1996

=== Articles ===
- Paul M. Schwartz, & Daniel J. Solove, The PII Problem: Privacy and a New Concept of Personally Identifiable Information, 86 N.Y.U. Law Review 1814 (2011)
- Karl-Nikolaus Peifer, & Paul M. Schwartz, Prosser’s Privacy and the German Right of Personality: Are Four Privacy Torts Better than One Unitary Concept?, 98 California Law Review 1925 (2010)
- Paul M. Schwartz, Preemption and Privacy, 118 Yale Law Journal 902 (2009)
- Paul M. Schwartz, Property, Privacy, and Personal Data, 117 Harvard Law Review 2055 (2004)
- Paul M. Schwartz, Voting Technology and Democracy, 75 N.Y.U. Law Review 625 (2002)
