= Daniel J. Solove =

American professor of law

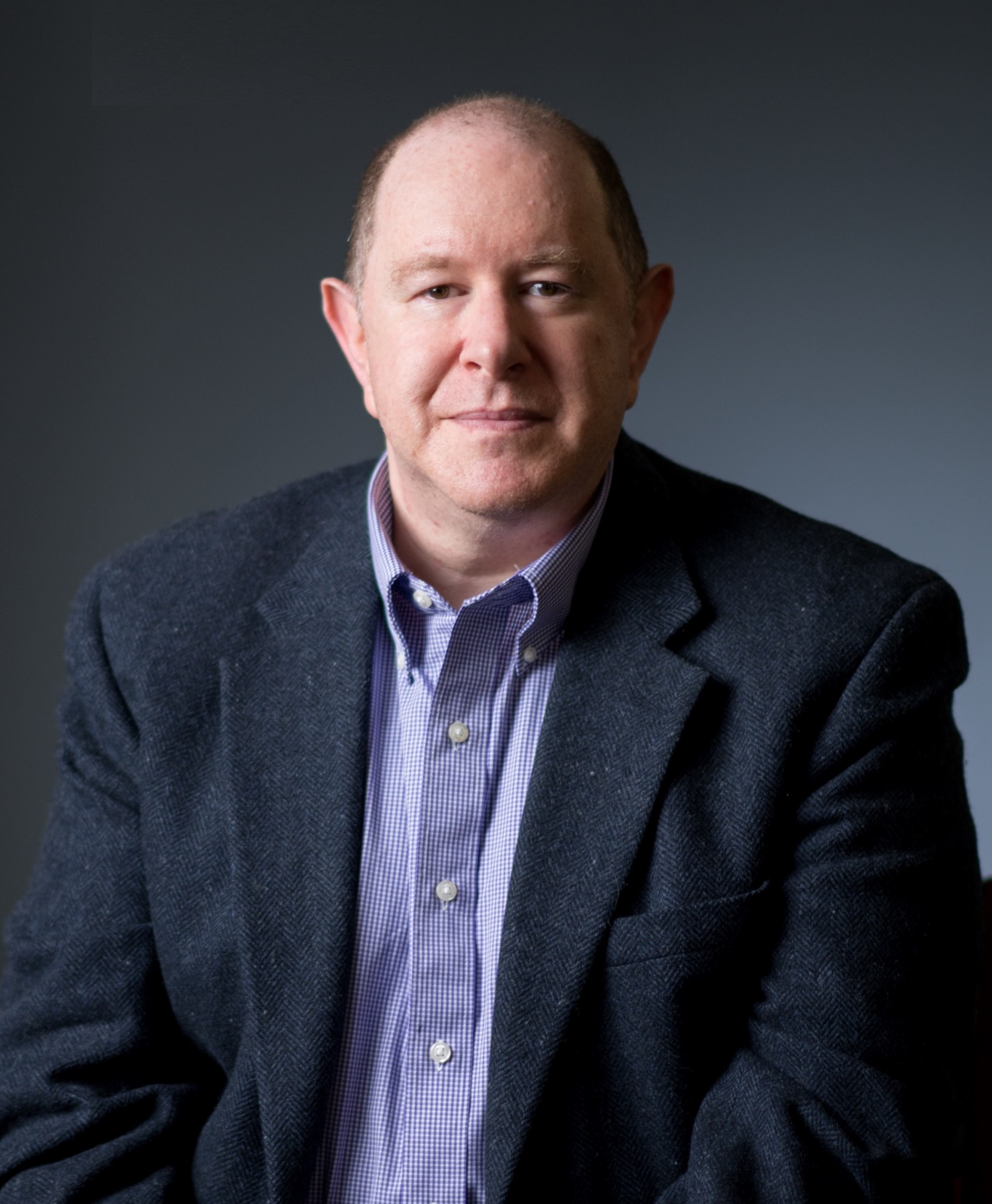
- Born: 1972 (age 53–54)
- Education: Washington University in St. Louis (A.B.), Yale Law School (J.D.)
- Employer: George Washington University Law School
- Website: http://docs.law.gwu.edu/facweb/dsolove/

Daniel J. Solove (/ˈsoʊloʊv/; born 1972) is the Eugene L. and Barbara A. Bernard Professor of Intellectual Property and Technology Law at the George Washington University Law School. He is well known for his academic work on privacy and for popular books on how privacy relates with information technology.

Solove is one of the world's leading experts in privacy and data security law, having authored 5 books, 8 textbooks, and more than 90 articles on the topic. Solove has been quoted by the media outlets including The New York Times, The Washington Post, The Wall Street Journal, USA Today, Chicago Tribune, the Associated Press, ABC, CBS, NBC, CNN, and NPR. He is also a member of the organizing committee of the Privacy and Security Academy and the Privacy Law Salon.

Solove has made the full text of many of his books freely available on the Social Science Research Network.

== Biography ==
Solove was born to Leslie and Richard Solove and grew up in Lancaster, PA. He graduated with honors from Washington University in St. Louis in June 1994 with a bachelor's degree in English literature and was elected to the Phi Beta Kappa honors society.

In 2005, Solove said that a legal research service marked by the company Westlaw that made it easy to look up the social security numbers of individuals was provided as "the best tool an identity thief can use. It's like giving a murderer the murder weapon or a burglar his burglary tools."

In 2009 Solove argued "that Congress or the Federal Trade Commission should prohibit companies from using SSNs (Social Security Numbers) as a means to verify identity."

In 2011 Tony Doyle wrote in The Journal of Value Inquiry that Solove "has established himself as one of the leading privacy theorists writing in English today."

== Selected publications ==
Popular Books:

- Breached! Why Data Security Law Fails and How to Improve It ISBN 978-0190940553
- Nothing to Hide: The False Tradeoff Between Privacy and Security (2011) ISBN 978-0300172331
- Understanding Privacy (2008) ISBN 978-0674035072
- The Future of Reputation: Gossip, Rumor, and Privacy on the Internet *2007) ISBN 978-0300144222
- The Digital Person: Technology and Privacy in the Information Age (2004) ISBN 978-0814740378

Text Books:

- Daniel Solove, Paul M. Schwartz (2009) Privacy and the Media, First Edition
- Daniel Solove, Paul M. Schwartz (2009) Privacy, Information and Technology, Second Edition
- Daniel Solove, Paul M. Schwartz (2009) Information Privacy Law, Third Edition
- Daniel Solove, Paul M. Schwartz (2011) Privacy Law Fundamentals

Journal articles:

- "A TAXONOMY OF PRIVACY." (Archive) University of Pennsylvania Law Review. January 2006. Volume 154, Issue 3. p. 477-560.
- "'I've Got Nothing to Hide' and Other Misunderstandings of Privacy." (Archive) George Washington University School of Law. 2007.

== See also ==
- Nothing to hide argument
