= Understanding Privacy =

- Author: Daniel J. Solove
- Subject: Privacy
- Publisher: Harvard University Press
- Publication date: 2008
- Publication place: United States
- Pages: 272
- ISBN: 9780674035072

Understanding Privacy is a 2008 book on privacy by Daniel J. Solove. The book gives a modern history of the concept of privacy particularly as it is discussed by philosophers and legal theorists. It provides a framework of many people's concept of privacy and the author's own theory of the outline of what privacy covers.

== Reviews ==
The book was reviewed by various commentators.

One reviewer said the book "is a vital text; a must read for all who follow, or engage in, privacy debates."
