= The Goose-Step (book) =

The Goose-step: A Study of American Education
- First edition
- Author: Upton Sinclair
- Language: English
- Subject: Sociology
- Publisher: Self (Pasadena, California)
- Publication date: 1923
- Publication place: United States
- Media type: Print (Hardcover first edition, softcover second edition); Reprinted 2004 by Kessinger Publishing in paperback
- Preceded by: The Brass Check
- Followed by: The Goslings

The Goose-step: A Study of American Education is a book, published in 1923, by the American novelist and muckraking journalist Upton Sinclair. It is an investigation into the consequences of plutocratic capitalist control of American colleges and universities. Sinclair writes, “Our educational system is not a public service, but an instrument of special privilege; its purpose is not to further the welfare of mankind, but merely to keep America capitalist." (p. 18)

The book is one of the “Dead Hand” series: six books Sinclair wrote on American institutions. The series also includes The Profits of Religion, The Brass Check (journalism), The Goslings (elementary and high school education), Mammonart (great literature, art and music) and Money Writes! (literature). Using "Dead Hand" as the title of the series, Sinclair tried to show the difference between the reality of a 'Dead Hand' of greed in human life and the ideal of Adam Smith’s "Invisible Hand" laissez-faire concept of guiding economics.

== Context ==
Published in 1923, The Goose-step was written during the post–World War I Red Scare. It was a time of great political awareness and activism on both left and right in the United States. On the left, there was widespread interest in Socialism and Communism, especially in the results of the 1917 Russian Revolution. Populist ideas were still alive, and Anarchism was in the news, with the Italian anarchists Sacco and Vanzetti arraigned in 1920 for a robbery and murder. On the right, the anti-German jingoism and florid patriotism of the war years had stirred up passions against pacifism and ‘foreign’ ideas such as Socialism and Communism. The Palmer raids against suspected radicals occurred in 1919, and superpatriotic organizations like the business-sponsored, anti-union Better America Foundation worked to shape public opinion.

Critiques of higher education had recently appeared, such as Thorstein Veblen’s 1918 book The Higher Learning in America.

Sinclair spent a year traveling the country for the book and interviewed over a thousand persons. Sinclair also used primary sources like letters, and secondary sources like student newspapers.

Sinclair had studied at Columbia University in New York City. One of the longest sections in the book discusses the school and its president, Nicholas Murray Butler.

Sinclair originally intended to also critique elementary and high schools, but because of length he saved that material for another book, published in 1924 as The Goslings.

== Title ==
Contemporary readers would have recognized the title, The Goose-step, as referring to the authoritarian Prussian culture of Germany, which the United States had recently helped to defeat in World War I. With the title, Sinclair implies that students in American universities and colleges were being trained to think in unison like German students. This is not surprising, he implies, as the presidents of major universities--Princeton, Columbia, Harvard, Pennsylvania, Yale, University of California-Berkeley and Stanford (p. 115), and the chancellor of New York University (p. 314)--had studied in Germany. “Everyone (sic) of them learned the Goose-step under the Kaiser!” (p. 115)

== Organization ==
To explain how higher education is controlled by financial interests, Sinclair quotes from a report of the 1913 Pujo Committee of the United States House of Representatives.

"Interlocking directorates" are "the device whereby three great banks in New York, with two trust companies under their control, manage the financial affairs and direct the policies of a hundred and twelve key corporations of America. The three banks are J. P. Morgan and Company, the First National Bank, and the National City Bank; and the two trust companies are the Guaranty and the Equitable. Their directors sit upon the boards of the corporations, sometimes several on each board, and their orders are obeyed because they control credit, which is the life-blood of our business world." (p. 19)

The interlocking directorate was equally well represented on the boards of trustees of American universities. Sinclair cites a survey by Evans Clark, "a preceptor in Princeton University--until he made this survey." Of the boards of the 29 largest universities, "the plutocratic class…composed 56 per cent of the membership of the privately controlled boards, and 68 per cent of the publicly controlled boards.” In contrast, the board members included 4-6 per cent farmers, no representatives of labor, and no inhouse professors to represent the faculty. (Clark's findings were confirmed by a 1917 study by Scott Nearing.)

For each school (see below), Sinclair describes how the interlocking directorate exercises its influence on the school's Board of Trustees. Bankers and powerful local businessmen dominate the boards, ensuring that school policies support their class interest.

This occurs in various ways. The school president serves the board rather than the educational interest of the students. Unqualified but politically conservative men are hired as administrators or professors. University funds are invested at artificially low interest rates at favored banks. Schools purchase land from people in their administration. The administration represses radical students and prohibits speeches by Socialists like Sinclair. Students at state universities, which are funded by the public, are nevertheless taught to serve the interests of the rich.

A major theme is professors' inability to speak freely in or out of class without fearing for their jobs (academic freedom). Rather, the Board of Trustees, acting through the school's president, suppressed any criticism of the status quo. Many faculty members were dismissed, driven out or denied promotion because of their political activities or views. Sinclair says that academic freedom was suppressed at church-sponsored and tax-supported (state) schools, as well as at private ones. Only one or two faculty members allowed Sinclair to use their names.

"I talked with another professor at Chicago, who does not want his name used. I asked him what he thought about the status of his profession, and he gave the best description of academic freedom in America that I have yet come upon. He said, 'We are good cows; we stand quietly in our stanchions, and give down our milk at regular hours. We are free, because we have no desire to do anything but what we are told we ought to do. And we die of premature senility.'" (p. 247)

Other chapters deal with the importance of keeping the support of wealthy and politically conservative alumni/donors, and the influence of plutocrat-founded policy organizations like Andrew Carnegie's Carnegie Foundation for the Advancement of Teaching and John D. Rockefeller’s General Education Board. A chapter, "The Academic Pogrom," concerns some institutions’ efforts to reduce the number of Jewish students and applicants. Final chapters support the alternative of workers’ education and labor colleges.

Among his prescriptions for change, Sinclair wanted more professors to unionize by joining the American Association of University Professors (only 2-3 per cent were unionized). He also wanted college students to experience real life: they should visit jails and work in factories, or alternatively have prisoners and labor leaders speak at their schools.

== Critical reactions ==
Critics have usually praised The Goose-step for bringing an enormous mass of information together in an engaging and readable book. It is “muckraking at its best”, an “honest effort to find out the truth” and "indispensable to any student of present American life." While they rarely if ever find errors of fact, they criticize Sinclair's interpretation as oversimplified: plutocrats are not responsible for all the problems with higher education.

Regarding suppression of academic freedom, one critic argues that “many [cases], perhaps a majority, were the result of war hysteria and should not be regarded as typical.”

== Institutions mentioned ==
Sinclair's epithet for the school follows; it refers to the major source of plutocratic influence on the Board of Directors or school administration.

- Columbia University: The University of the House of Morgan
- Harvard University: The University of Lee-Higginson
- University of Pennsylvania: The University of U.G.I. (United Gas Improvement Company)
- Princeton University: The Tiger’s Lair
- Yale University: The Bull-Dog’s Den
- University of California (Berkeley): The University of the Black Hand
- Stanford University
- Reed College (Portland, Or.), University of Oregon (Eugene, Or.): The University of the Lumber Trust
- University of Washington (Seattle): The University of the Chimes
- University of Montana (four schools): The Universities of the Anaconda
- University of Idaho (Moscow)
- University of Utah: The University of the Latter Day Saints
- University of Denver: The Mining Camp University
- Colorado College, Colorado School of Mines: The Colleges of the Smelter Trust
- North Dakota Agricultural College
- University of North Dakota-Grand Forks: The University of Wheat
- University of Minnesota: The University of the Ore Trust
- University of Wisconsin–Madison
- University of Chicago: The University of Standard Oil
- Northwestern University: The University of Judge Gary
- University of Illinois (Urbana): The University of the Grand Duchess (Mary E. Busey, widow of Samuel Busey)
- University of Michigan (Detroit): The University of Automobiles
- University of Pittsburgh: The University of the Steel Trust
- Syracuse University: The University of Heaven
- Clark University
- Johns Hopkins University
- Cornell University
- Brown University
- Wesleyan University
- New York University: The University of Jabbergrab
- City Colleges of New York (College of the City of New York: men; Hunter College: women)
- University of Southern California

Briefer references to: MIT, Cincinnati, Washington University, Temple, Nebraska, Oklahoma, Iowa, Ohio State, Beloit, Marietta College, Rockford College, Williams College, Delaware, Bryn Mawr. Religious colleges: Wooster, Muskingum, Allegheny, Washburn, American University, Trinity, Baylor, SMU, Bethany, Emory and Henry, and Drew Theological Seminary (later Drew University).

Institutions Sinclair praises: Union Theological Seminary, Berkeley Divinity School (Middletown CT), Oberlin, Iliff School of Theology (Denver), Y.M.C.A. College (Springfield, MA), Harvard Law, Amherst, Swarthmore, University of North Carolina, New School for Social Research

All page numbers refer to the second edition (1923).
