= The Brass Check =

1919 book by Upton Sinclair

- Ninth, and Revised Edition with Index
- Author: Upton Sinclair
- Language: English
- Genre: Sociology, Muckraking
- Publisher: Self (Pasadena, California)
- Publication date: 1919
- Publication place: United States
- Media type: Print (Hardcover)
- Preceded by: The Profits of Religion
- Followed by: The Goose-Step

The Brass Check is a muckraking exposé of American journalism by Upton Sinclair published in 1919. It focuses mainly on newspapers and the Associated Press wire service, along with a few magazines. Other critiques of the press had appeared, but Sinclair reached a wider audience with his personal fame and lively, provocative writing style. Among those critiqued was William Randolph Hearst, who made routine use of yellow journalism in his widespread newspaper and magazine business.

Sinclair called The Brass Check "the most important and most dangerous book I have ever written." The University of Illinois Press released a new edition of the book in 2003, which contains a preface by Robert W. McChesney and Ben Scott. Sinclair opted not to copyright the text in an effort to maximize its readership.

For much of Sinclair's career he was known as a "two book author": for writing The Jungle and The Brass Check. Sinclair organized ten printings of The Brass Check in its first decade and sold over 150,000 copies.

== Overview ==
The book is one of the "Dead Hand" series: six books Sinclair wrote on American institutions. The series also includes The Profits of Religion, The Goose-step (higher education), The Goslings (elementary and high school education), Mammonart (great literature, art and music) and Money Writes! (literature). The term "Dead Hand" criticizes Adam Smith's concept that allowing an "invisible hand" of capitalist greed to shape economic relations provides the best result for society as a whole.

A brass check was the token purchased by a customer in a brothel and given to the woman of his choice. Sinclair implies that, in a similar fashion, the owners of the mass media purchase journalists' services in supporting the owners' political and financial interests.

== Detailed synopsis ==
The Brass Check has three sections: documented cases of newspapers' refusal to publicize Socialist causes and Sinclair's investigations of business corruption, cases where he was not personally involved, and proposed remedies. Sinclair incorporates other people's reactions to his cause into his nonfiction works, fostering objectivity.

Sinclair criticizes newspapers as ultra-conservative and supporting the political and economic powers that be, or as sensational tabloids practicing yellow journalism, such as newspapers run by William Randolph Hearst. In both cases, their purpose is to promote the business interests of the paper's owners, the owner's bankers, and/or the paper's advertisers. This is accomplished in several ways; among them: The publishers tell the editors what can and cannot be printed. Journalists routinely invent stories. To stimulate circulation, newspapers sensationalize trivial stories and destroy lives and reputations. Errors and slanders are never retracted, or the retraction is buried in the paper months later.

The editors and journalists of the Associated Press (AP) wire service fail to serve the public interest in the same way as employees of the individual papers. Controlled by 41 large newspaper corporations, the AP acts in their interests.

Sinclair quotes a letter from the editor of the weekly San Francisco Star, James H. Barry:

You wish to know my "confidential opinion as to the honesty of the Associated Press." My opinion, not confidential, is that it is the damndest, meanest monopoly on the face of the earth--the wet-nurse for all other monopolies. It lies by day, it lies by night, and it lies for the very lust of lying. Its news-gatherers, I sincerely believe, only obey orders.

Among the recent events whose media coverage he discusses are the Paint Creek–Cabin Creek strike of 1912 in West Virginia, the Ludlow Massacre in Colorado in 1914, Industrial Workers of the World meetings, and the Red Scare whipped up by the newspapers. As a tireless investigative reporter, Sinclair offered the results of his investigations to the newspapers for publication, but was almost entirely ignored.

The war propaganda tactics introduced during World War I were continued after the war against political dissenters. Sinclair writes, "[T]oday all the energies which were directed against the Kaiser have been turned against the radicals."

== Remedies proposed ==
Sinclair recognized that a grass-roots response (mass meetings, demonstrations, circulating pamphlets, etc.) was not adequate when the mass media spread misinformation or ignored the truth. His main proposed remedies were:

- a law that any newspaper which prints a false statement shall be required to give equal prominence to a correction, on penalty of a substantial fine.
- the AP's monopoly, which he saw as a "public utility", should be challenged by other wire services.
- a law forbidding any newspaper to fake telegraph or cable dispatches.
- reporters must unionize so they have the power to fix their wage-scale and their ethical code.
- an endowed weekly chronicle of news, without advertisements or editorials, cheaply printed and widely available.

== Political reception ==
The first code of ethics for journalists was created in 1923.

By 1923, the FBI had a report on The Brass Check in its files, and a memorandum in the file noted that the directing manager of the Associated Press "has in his possession a confidential report on the book, The Brass Check."

Sinclair challenged those who charged him with inaccuracy to review his published facts and to sue him for libel if they found he had been wrong. None did. But because Sinclair was denied access to the mainstream media to refute those charges, they assumed the aura of truth and gave the book a reputation for inaccuracy that caused it to be almost forgotten by midcentury.

== Critical reception ==
Press watchdogs at the time of publication and recently find The Brass Check's analysis of the media accurate and valuable. It is "muckraking at its best" and "astonishingly prescient in its critique of the coziness of big media and other corporate interests."

However, on its publication "[m]ost newspapers refused to review the book, and those very few that did were almost always unsympathetic. Many newspapers, like the New York Times, even refused to run paid advertisements for the book." And "those historians who bother to mention The Brass Check dismiss it as ephemeral, explaining that the problems it depicts have been solved."

In a 1921 review in the Journal of Political Economy, Curtice N. Hitchcock criticized Sinclair's proposed solution to journalistic corruption, which was to abolish the profit motive in journalism. Hitchcock argued that it would be inadequate. He argued instead that the solution is to establish journalistic professionalism.

== Editions ==
- Sinclair, Upton. "The Brass Check. A Study of American Journalism". Teleread.
- Sinclair, Upton (1919). The Brass Check. A Study of American Journalism (PDF) (Illustrated ed.). Pasadena, CA: Published by the Author.
- Sinclair, Upton (2003). The Brass Check. A Study of American Journalism. McChesney, Robert W. (Introduction) & Ben Scott (Introduction) (Reprinted ed.). Urbana, Illinois: University of Illinois Press. ISBN 0-252-02805-8.
