= Mammonart =

1925 book of literary criticism by Upton Sinclair

Mammonart. An Essay in Economic Interpretation
- First edition
- Author: Upton Sinclair
- Language: English
- Publisher: Self (Pasadena, California)
- Publication date: 1925
- Media type: Print (Hardcover)
- Pages: 390 pages

Mammonart. An Essay in Economic Interpretation (1925) is a book of literary criticism by the American novelist, journalist, and political activist Upton Sinclair. He offers his assessments, from a socialist point of view, of 85 past "great authors" (along with a few painters and composers) from Europe and the United States.

== Background ==
In the late 1910s and 1920s, Sinclair wrote a series of books about American institutions and culture: The Profits of Religion (Christianity), The Brass Check (news media), The Goose-step (higher education), The Goslings (elementary and high school education), Mammonart (traditional literature, art and music), and Money Writes! (contemporary literature). He called these books the "Dead Hand" series—a sardonic derivation of Adam Smith's "invisible hand" that guides capitalism.

== Contents ==
Sinclair's title merges "Mammon" and "art" to emphasize how art has always been, in his estimation, commodified and controlled by the wealthy. He begins the book with a framing device in the form of an extended allegory. It is, according to his biographer Anthony Arthur:

an allegory of the first artist, the Neanderthal "Ogi", who finds meaning in his life by scratching crude images on his cave wall of the beasts he eats and who try to eat him. Ogi's mate—Mrs. Ogi—supports him, but the tribe, dominated by early members of the Los Angeles Merchants and Manufacturers Association, expels him because he alone, among all the other painters, refuses to make the images they want. Finding refuge in another cave, Ogi continues his work, poor and isolated but honest. His more pliable fellow artists remain in the big cave, well fed and honored. Thus we see, Sinclair says, that "from the dawn of human history, the path to honor and success in the arts has been through the service and glorification of the ruling classes; entertaining them, making them pleasant to themselves, and teaching their subjects and slaves to stand in awe of them."

Mammonart is interspersed with brief dialogues between a modern-day Mr. and Mrs. Ogi, as represented by Sinclair and his wife Mary Craig. They trade quips and barbs in a kind of running commentary on the book and on the history of art.

In the majority of chapters, there is a short biography and critique of a famous writer from the past. Sinclair's assessment depends on how he measures that writer's level of support for the rich and powerful. He asserts that throughout history, most artists have not challenged the status quo, but instead took apolitical positions such as "art for art's sake" or "art is entertainment". From Sinclair's perspective, such artists perpetuated injustice and inequality no matter how beautiful the work they created. For example, in his chapter on Shakespeare entitled "Phosphorescence and Decay", Sinclair praises the poet-playwright's glorious facility with words, but claims that Shakespeare's talent "saved him the need of thinking". In contrast, Dickens' unique contribution was to "force into the aristocratic and exclusive realms of art the revolutionary notion that the poor and degraded are equally as interesting as the rich and respectable."

Mammonart is notable for Sinclair's repeated statement that all art, including his own, is propaganda. The popular distinction between "pure and unsullied creative artists" like Shakespeare and Goethe, and "propagandists" like Jesus and Tolstoi, "is purely a class distinction and a class weapon; itself a piece of ruling-class propaganda, a means of duping the minds of men, and keeping them enslaved to false standards of art and of life."

The list of artists that Sinclair discusses is similar to, though shorter than, a 1940 list of Great Books. He also adds several writers who contemporary readers might deem of lesser importance, but who were regarded in the 1920s as part of the American literary canon.

Artists discussed:

1. Homer
2. Aeschylus
3. Sophocles
4. Euripides
5. Aristophanes
6. Virgil
7. Horace
8. Juvenal
9. Boccaccio
10. Dante
11. Miguel de Cervantes
12. Michelangelo
13. Raphael
14. Shakespeare
15. John Milton
16. John Bunyan
17. John Dryden
18. Pierre Corneille
19. Jean Racine
20. Molière
21. Voltaire
22. Rousseau
23. Jonathan Swift
24. Samuel Richardson
25. Henry Fielding
26. Robert Burns
27. Beethoven
28. Goethe
29. Jane Austen
30. Sir Walter Scott
31. Samuel Taylor Coleridge
32. Robert Southey
33. William Wordsworth
34. John Keats
35. Honoré de Balzac
36. Victor Hugo
37. Théophile Gautier
38. Alfred de Musset
39. George Sand
40. Flaubert
41. Heinrich Heine
42. Richard Wagner
43. Thomas Carlyle
44. Alfred Lord Tennyson
45. Robert Browning
46. Matthew Arnold
47. Charles Dickens
48. William Makepeace Thackeray
49. John Ruskin
50. William Morris
51. Ralph Waldo Emerson
52. Henry Wadsworth Longfellow
53. John Greenleaf Whittier
54. Nathaniel Hawthorne
55. Edgar Allan Poe
56. Walt Whitman
57. Pushkin
58. Gogol
59. Turgenev
60. Dostoievski
61. Tolstoi
62. Goncourt brothers
63. Émile Zola
64. Guy De Maupassant
65. Henrik Ibsen
66. Strindberg
67. Nietzsche
68. Emile Verhaeren
69. Algernon Charles Swinburne
70. Oscar Wilde
71. James Abbott McNeill Whistler
72. George Meredith
73. Henry James
74. Mrs. Humphry Ward
75. Mark Twain
76. William Dean Howells
77. Ambrose Bierce
78. Richard Harding Davis
79. Stephen Crane
80. Frank Norris
81. David Graham Phillips
82. O. Henry
83. Jack London
84. Anatole France
85. Percy Bysshe Shelley

In the last chapter, Sinclair says he wrote Mammonart as a "text-book of culture". He jokingly predicts that it will be used as a Russian high school text-book "within six months", and will be adopted by the rest of Europe "as soon as the social revolution comes".

== Critical reception ==
As a self-described work of propaganda, Mammonart was mostly ignored by critics. Current History included a one-paragraph summary stating, "Mr. Sinclair contends that all art is propaganda, no matter how carefully disguised or how great the artist's devotion to the theory of 'art for art's sake.'"

In The New English Weekly, the literary scholar Herbert Read accused Sinclair of denigrating outstanding writers out of spite, because "no critic of importance has ever mistaken [him] for an artist. He is the poète manqué, the cock without a comb. The midden he crows on is immense, but it is muck." A reviewer in the Sydney Bulletin offered a more generous interpretation, suggesting that Sinclair's book was often informative and amusing "if you drop entirely his theory".

== Legacy ==
Mammonart was reprinted in paperback in 2003 by Simon Publications. In 2022, the book was made available on Project Gutenberg.

== Quotations ==
"All art is propaganda. It is universally and inescapably propaganda; sometimes unconsciously, but often deliberately, propaganda." (p. 9)

"Great art is produced when propaganda of vitality and importance is put across with technical competence in terms of the art selected." (p. 10)

On his enjoyment of John Bunyan's Pilgrims Progress, "One does not escape the need of personal morality by espousing proletarian revolution." (p. 112)
