= Nothing to hide argument =

Argument against surveillance

The "nothing to hide" argument is a logical fallacy which states that an individual has no reason to fear or oppose surveillance or breach of privacy, unless they are afraid they will uncover their own wrongdoing. This argument is often used to claim that one should not worry about government surveillance as long as they have "nothing to hide".

== History ==
An early instance of this argument was referenced by Henry James in his 1888 novel, The Reverberator:

If these people had done bad things they ought to be ashamed of themselves and he couldn't pity them, and if they hadn't done them there was no need of making such a rumpus about other people knowing.

Upton Sinclair also referenced a similar argument in his book The Profits of Religion, published in 1917 :

Not merely was my own mail opened, but the mail of all my relatives and friends — people residing in places as far apart as California and Florida. I recall the bland smile of a government official to whom I complained about this matter: "If you have nothing to hide you have nothing to fear." My answer was that a study of many labor cases had taught me the methods of the agent provocateur. He is quite willing to take real evidence if he can find it; but if not, he has familiarized himself with the affairs of his victim, and can make evidence which will be convincing when exploited by the yellow press.

The motto "If you've got nothing to hide, you've got nothing to fear" has been used in defense of the closed-circuit television program practiced in the United Kingdom.

== Usage ==
This argument is commonly used in discussions regarding privacy. Legal scholar Geoffrey Stone said that the use of the argument is "all-too-common". Bruce Schneier, a data security expert and cryptographer, described it as the "most common retort against privacy advocates." Colin J. Bennett, author of The Privacy Advocates, said that an advocate of privacy often "has to constantly refute" the argument. Bennett explained that most people "go through their daily lives believing that surveillance processes are not directed at them, but at the miscreants and wrongdoers" and that "the dominant orientation is that mechanisms of surveillance are directed at others" despite "evidence that the monitoring of individual behavior has become routine and everyday".

An ethnographic study by Ana Viseu, Andrew Clement, and Jane Aspinal revealed that individuals with higher socioeconomic status were not as concerned by surveillance as their counterparts. In another study regarding privacy-enhancing technology, Viseu et al., noticed a compliancy regarding user privacy. Both studies attributed this attitude to the nothing to hide argument.

A qualitative study conducted for the government of the United Kingdom around 2003 found that self-employed men initially used the "nothing to hide" argument before shifting to an argument in which they perceived surveillance to be a nuisance instead of a threat.

Viseu et al., said that the argument "has been well documented in the privacy literature as a stumbling block to the development of pragmatic privacy protection strategies, and it, too, is related to the ambiguous and symbolic nature of the term ‘privacy' itself." They explained that privacy is an abstract concept and people only become concerned with it once their privacy is gone. Furthermore, they compare a loss to privacy with people knowing that ozone depletion and global warming are negative developments, but that "the immediate gains of driving the car to work or putting on hairspray outweigh the often invisible losses of polluting the environment."

== Criticism ==
=== Abuse of private information ===
Daniel J. Solove argues that without privacy rights, governments could harm citizens by leaking sensitive information about them; by using such information to deny them services, even if they committed no crime; or even simply by error. According to Solove, "when engaged directly, the nothing-to-hide argument can ensnare, for it forces the debate to focus on its narrow understanding of privacy. But when confronted with the plurality of privacy problems implicated by government data collection and use beyond surveillance and disclosure, the nothing-to-hide argument, in the end, has nothing to say."

Bruce Schneier cites a statement widely attributed to Cardinal Richelieu ("give me six lines written by the hand of the most honest man, I'll find enough to hang him") to illustrate that even a small amount of mundane information about a person can be used to persecute or blackmail them.

Julian Assange agreed with Jacob Appelbaum, remarking that "mass surveillance is a mass structural change. When society goes bad, it's going to take you with it, even if you are the blandest person on earth."

Ignacio Cofone argues that the argument is mistaken in its own terms, because whenever people disclose relevant information to others they also must disclose irrelevant information, and this irrelevant information has privacy costs and can lead to discrimination or other harmful effects.

=== Privacy as an innate right ===
Edward Snowden remarked that "arguing that you don't care about the right to privacy because you have nothing to hide is no different than saying you don't care about free speech because you have nothing to say."

Alex Winter stated that "[he doesn't] accept the idea that if we have nothing to hide we have nothing to fear. Privacy serves a purpose. It’s why we have blinds on our windows and a door on our bathroom."

Emilio Mordini argues that the "nothing to hide" argument is inherently paradoxical, because people do not need to have "something to hide" in order to be hiding "something". Mordini makes the point that the content of what is hidden is not necessarily relevant; instead, he argues that it is necessary to have an intimate area which can be both hidden and access-restricted, because–from a psychological perspective–people become individuals when they discover that it is possible to hide something from others.

In defending the right to privacy, Lowry Pressly argues that "privacy [is] not for preventing the discovery of some particular piece of information or person, as hiding and secrecy are. Rather, privacy perpetuates a state of affairs in which there is no information, no fact of the matter, one way or another—for the world at large, but also sometimes for oneself. This state of affairs is destroyed by surveillance or snooping even if nothing hidden is discovered, since a piece of information has been created by the discovery that I really did have nothing to hide."

=== Privacy vs. security ===
Adam D. Moore argues that "it is the view that rights are resistant to cost/benefit or consequentialist sort of arguments... privacy interests are [not] the sorts of things that can be traded for security." He also states that surveillance can disproportionately affect certain groups in society based on appearance, ethnicity, sexuality, and religion.

Bruce Schneier states that the choice is not "security versus privacy", but rather "liberty versus control".

== See also ==
- Biometrics – Metrics related to human characteristics
- Information privacy law – Law that governs the processing of personal data
- Mass surveillance – Intricate surveillance of an entire or a substantial fraction of a population
- National security – Security and defence of a nation state
- Optimism bias – Type of cognitive bias
- Right to privacy – Legal tradition restraining actions threatening individual privacy
- ignoratio elenchi – Informal logical fallacy, which accurately characterizes this argument
