= Alan F. Westin =

American academic (1929–2013)

Alan Furman Westin (October 11, 1929 – February 18, 2013) was a Professor of Public Law & Government Emeritus, Columbia University, former publisher of Privacy & American Business, and former President of the Center for Social & Legal Research.

== Work ==
Westin earned a BA from the University of Florida in 1948 and a law degree from Harvard Law School in 1951. Westin's research at Columbia University in the 1960s is widely seen as the first significant work on the problem of consumer data privacy and data protection. Westin defined privacy as "the claim of individuals, groups, or institutions to determine for themselves when, how, and to what extent information about them is communicated to others."

Westin's major books on privacy – Privacy and Freedom (1967) and Databanks in a Free Society (1972) – were pioneering works that prompted U.S. privacy legislation and helped launch global privacy movements in many democratic nations in the 1960s and 70s. He has also specialized in studying the impact of information technologies on national and local governmental operations, from decision-making to citizen services and freedom of information administration, illustrated by his 1971 book, Information Technology in a Democracy.

During the 1970s, Westin edited the Civil Liberties Review, a bimonthly publication of the American Civil Liberties Union Foundation, from his home in Teaneck, New Jersey.

In 1993, with Washington attorney Robert Belair, Dr. Westin founded Privacy & American Business, a non-profit think tank that provided expert analysis and a balanced voice on business-privacy issues. P&AB published a bi-monthly newsletter; conducted an annual national conference in Washington on “Managing The Privacy Revolution”; and led a Corporate Privacy Leadership Program and a Global Business Privacy Policies Project. P&AB also managed privacyexchange.org – a global Internet web site on consumers, commerce, and data protection worldwide, covering privacy developments in over 100 nations. The Center finished its work in the Fall of 2006.

As part of Privacy & American Business, Westin performed dozens of public-opinion poll surveys, ones that often supported the policy goals and conclusions of their sponsors. The Wall Street Journal reported that Westin was, "on the payrolls of many of the large financial services, technology and marketing companies that have resisted new privacy rules and legislation, including GlaxoSmithKline PLC, Equifax Inc. and First Data Corp. In addition to being consulting clients, Merck & Co., Visa International's Visa USA unit, DoubleClick Inc. and Verizon Communications are among the contributors to his nonprofit research group, the Center for Social and Legal Research." Westin's survey research broadly supported the "notice and choice" model of privacy protection, one where privacy is largely left to the market and consumers make choices based on privacy policies. In a synoptic review of Westin's studies, two Berkeley professors concluded, "the most cited aspect of Westin's work--his characterization of consumers' decisions as pragmatic, and his argument that consumer decisions signaled the collective sense of how society should balance privacy and new technologies--should, we think, be strongly questioned."

A resident of Teaneck for decades, Westin died of cancer on February 18, 2013 at a hospice in Saddle River, New Jersey at the age of 83.

== Awards ==
In 2005, Westin received the Privacy Leadership Award of the International Association of Privacy Professionals.

In 2012, Westin was one of the recipients of the first Louis D. Brandeis Privacy Award, given by Patient Privacy Rights.
