= The Profits of Religion =

1917 book by Upton Sinclair

The Profits of Religion: An Essay in Economic Interpretation
- First edition
- Author: Upton Sinclair
- Language: English
- Subject: Sociology
- Publisher: Self (Pasadena, California)
- Publication date: 1917
- Publication place: United States
- Media type: Print; Reprinted 2004 by Kessinger Publishing in paperback

The Profits of Religion: An Essay in Economic Interpretation is a nonfiction book, first published in 1917, by the American novelist and muck-raking journalist Upton Sinclair. It is a snapshot of the religious movements in the U.S. before its entry into World War I.

The book is the first of the "Dead Hand" series: six books Sinclair wrote on American institutions. The series also includes The Brass Check (journalism), The Goose-step (higher education), The Goslings (elementary and high school education), Mammonart (art) and Money Writes! (literature). The term "Dead Hand" ironically refers to Adam Smith's concept that allowing an "invisible hand" of individual self-interest to shape economic relations provides the best result for society as a whole.

In this book, Sinclair attacks institutionalized religion as a "source of income to parasites, and the natural ally of every form of oppression and exploitation."

== Overview ==
Most clergymen are hypocrites, but they are not entirely to blame. Like other men, they are victimized by "the competitive wage-system, which presents them with the alternative to swindle or to starve."

Sinclair savages the Episcopal establishment for transforming the proletarian Jesus into a defender of wealth and privilege, and for a long history of alliance with political power in England and the United States.

Turning to the "nonconforming" Protestant sects, adherents of "The Church of the Merchants" are focused on achieving prosperity within the existing economic system. So are the devotees of the mostly California-based 'new religions' or 'cults', including New Thought.

Sinclair wants to rescue the true message of Jesus, the friend of the poor and brother of all men.

== Divisions of the book ==
Note: The chapters of Book Six are listed to give a flavor of Sinclair's writing style.

- Book One: The Church of the Conquerors (Priesthoods living off the wealth produced by workers)
- Book Two: The Church of Good Society (Protestant Episcopal)
- Book Three: The Church of the Servant Girls (Catholic)
- Book Four: The Church of the Slavers (how institutionalized religion, particularly in Germany, oppresses the people)
- Book Five: The Church of the Merchants (nonconformist Protestant)
- Book Six: The Church of the Quacks
  - Tabula Rasa
  - The Book of Mormon
  - Holy Rolling
  - Bible Prophecy
  - Koreshanity
  - Mazdaznan
  - Black magic
  - Mental malpractice
  - Science and wealth
  - New nonsense
  - "Dollars Want Me!"
  - Spiritual financiering
  - The Graft of Grace
- Book Seven: The Church of the Social Revolution (based on Jesus the proletarian and brother of all humankind)

== Critical reception ==
Reviewing several of the Dead Hand series, a contemporary critic wrote, "These great pamphlets…are storehouses of laborious research. They are indispensable to any student of present American life. I have heard Upton Sinclair charged with reckless, inaccurate and indiscreet use of his material. I am glad to say here that in my own experience I have found him scrupulously anxious, at whatever trouble to himself, to report the exact facts and to weigh carefully his judgments upon them. Why, then, have not these books the authority which they should have?…His explanation is oversimplified; he tends to see his facts in the light of a single motive."

In The Brass Check (1919), Sinclair wrote, "The Profits of Religion was practically boycotted by the capitalist press of America. Just one newspaper, the Chicago Daily News, reviewed it—or rather allowed me space in which to review it myself. Just one religious publication, the Churchman, took the trouble to ridicule it at length. Half a dozen others sneered at it in brief paragraphs, and half a dozen newspapers did the same, and that was all the publicity the book got, except in the radical press."
