= Adam D. Moore =

American philosopher

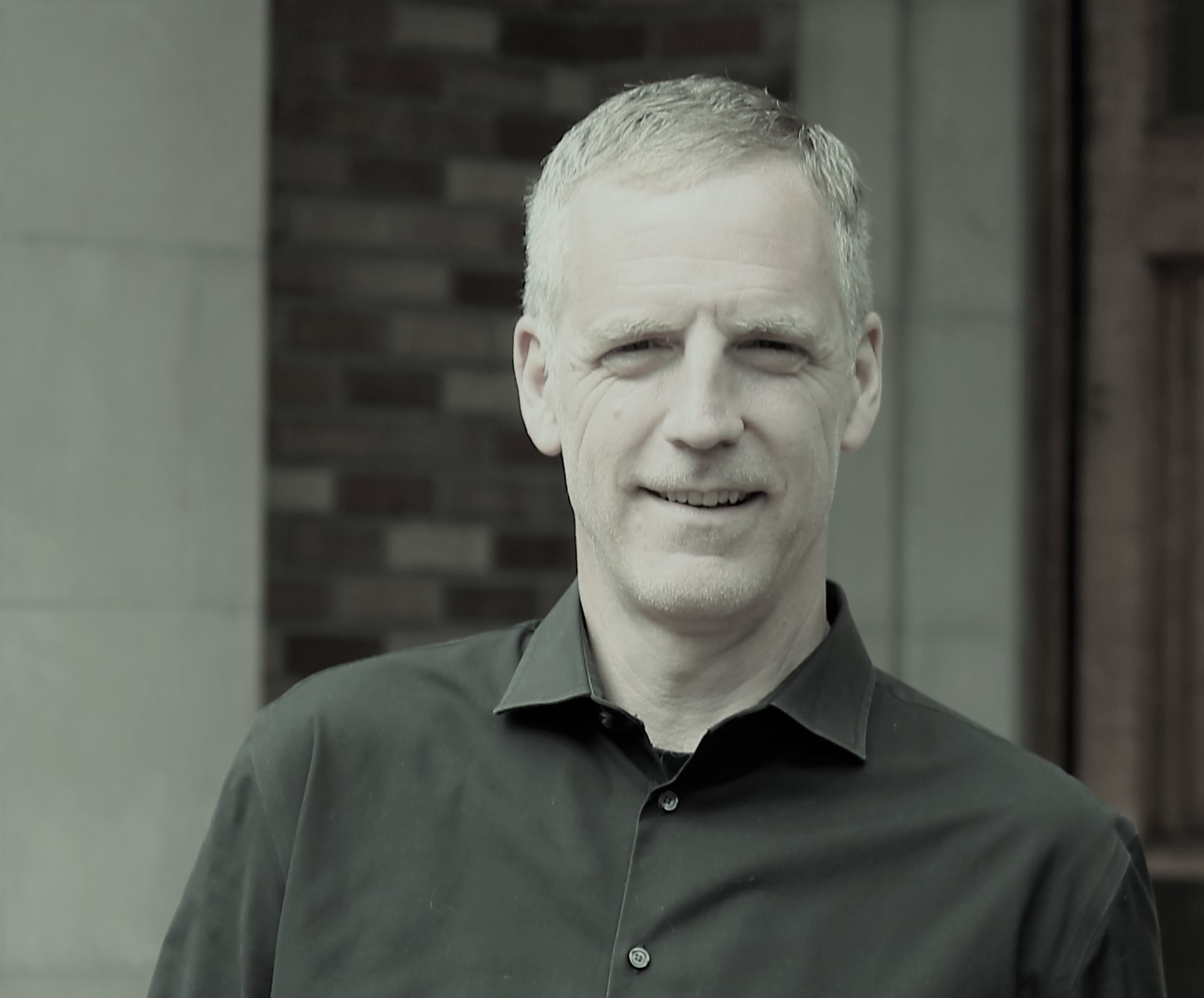
- Moore 2020
- Website: http://faculty.washington.edu/moore2/moore.htm

Adam Daniel Moore (born 1965) is a philosopher and Professor at the University of Washington Information School. He conducts research and teaches in the areas of information ethics (intellectual property, privacy, free speech, hacking/security), social and political philosophy, philosophy of law, and normative ethical theory.

== Education and career ==
Moore earned his bachelor's degree (1990), master's degree (1994), and a Ph.D. in philosophy (1997) from Ohio State University. Under the direction of Donald Clayton Hubin, Moore's dissertation was titled "A Lockean Theory of Intellectual Property." He worked as a teaching professor in the philosophy department at California State University, Fresno, CA (1998 – 1999), and Wright State University, Dayton, OH (1999 – 2000), and as a tenure-track Assistant Professor at Eastern Michigan University, Ypsilanti, MI (2000 – 2003). In 2003 he moved to the University of Washington and held a joint position as an Assistant and then Associate Professor in the Information School and the Philosophy Department. In 2013 Moore moved to the Information School full time and was promoted to Professor in 2016.

== Philosophical work ==
He is the author of Intellectual Property: Moral and Legal Foundations, Privacy Rights: Moral and Legal Foundations, and Intellectual Property and Information Control. Moore is also the editor of Privacy, Security, and Accountability: Ethics, Law, and Policy, Information Ethics: Privacy, Property, and Power, and Intellectual Property: Moral, Legal, and International Dilemmas.

Reviews of Privacy Rights: Moral and Legal Foundations note, "No-one who wants to know about the current state of the philosophical debate as to what privacy is and why it is valuable should ignore Moore’s contribution. It is and will be a most useful reference point for all future writing" and "Advocates of privacy should welcome Adam Moore's engaging defense of privacy rights, and in particular his iconoclastic challenge to the prevailing view that privacy is fine so long as it does not impinge on free speech."

Moore has published articles in many journals, including Social Philosophy and Policy, American Philosophical Quarterly, Bioethics, Business Ethics Quarterly, The Canadian Journal of Law and Jurisprudence, The Journal of Value Inquiry, and the Journal of Social Philosophy. He has also written the "Privacy" entry for The International Encyclopedia of Ethics and "Intellectual Property" for the Stanford Encyclopedia of Philosophy.

Moore's Lockean account of intellectual property is defended in Intellectual Property: Moral and Legal Foundations and Intellectual Property and Information Control (2001/2004) as well as several articles including, “A Lockean Theory of Intellectual Property” (1998), “Intellectual Property: Theory, Privilege, and Pragmatism” (2003), “Intellectual Property” (2011/2014), “A Lockean Theory of Intellectual Property Revisited” (2012), and “Intellectual Property and the Prisoner's Dilemma: A Game Theory Justification of Copyrights, Patents, and Trade Secrets,” (2018). His account builds on John Locke's proviso that justified acquisitions must leave "enough and as good for others."

== Public education, Media, Opinion ==
Moore has been interviewed and cited by a wide range of national and local media, including Psychology Today, the Prindle Institute for Ethics, Newsweek, the Pacific Standard, Royal News, UCLA Privacy News, Utah State Today, ViPS, the Institute for Values in Policy and Science: Public Lecture Series on Privacy, Philosophy and Law Newsletter, Milwaukee Journal Sentinel (with Steven Schwinn, Adam D. Moore, Marc Rotenberg, Alberto Bernabe, and Kathryn Kolbert).

== Selected publications ==
=== Books ===
==== As author ====
- Intellectual Property: Moral and Legal Foundations. Cambridge University Press, February 2026.
- Privacy Rights: Moral and Legal Foundations. University Park, Pa.: Pennsylvania State University Press. 2010. ISBN 978-0-271-05666-1. OCLC 780532257.
- Intellectual Property and Information Control: Philosophic Foundations and Contemporary Issues. New Brunswick, N.J.: Transaction Publishers. 2001. ISBN 978-1-4128-0047-1. OCLC 52859352 – via Internet Archive.

==== As editor ====
- Privacy, Security, and Accountability: Ethics, Law, and Policy. Lanham, MD: Rowman & Littlefield International. 2015. ISBN 978-1-78348-477-5. OCLC 933297477 – via Internet Archive.
- Information Ethics: Privacy, Property, and Power. Seattle: University of Washington Press. 2005. ISBN 978-0-295-80366-1. JSTOR j.ctvcwns7f. OCLC 841171087 – via Internet Archive.

=== Articles ===
==== Journal ====
- "Defining Privacy". Journal of Social Philosophy. 39 (3): 411–428. Fall 2008. doi:10.1111/j.1467-9833.2008.00433.x. SSRN 1980849.
- "Intellectual Property, Innovation, and Social Progress: The Case Against Incentive Based Arguments" (PDF). The Hamline Law Review. 26. Hamline University School of Law, West Publishing Company: 602–630. 2003. doi:10.2139/ssrn.1973405. ISSN 1556-5068. OCLC 7374586836.
- "Privacy: Its Meaning and Value". American Philosophical Quarterly. 40 (3). [North American Philosophical Publications, University of Illinois Press]: 215–227. 2003. ISSN 0003-0481. JSTOR 20010117. OCLC 5543705991.
- "Employee Monitoring and Computer Technology: Evaluative Surveillance V. Privacy" (PDF). Business Ethics Quarterly. 10 (3). Cambridge University Press (CUP): 697–709. 2000. doi:10.2307/3857899. ISSN 1052-150X. JSTOR 3857899. OCLC 5550044023. S2CID 262259919.
- "Intangible Property: Privacy, Power, and Information Control" (PDF). American Philosophical Quarterly. 35 (4). [North American Philosophical Publications, University of Illinois Press]: 365–378. 1998. ISSN 0003-0481. JSTOR 20009944.
- "Toward Informational Privacy Rights". San Diego Law Review. 44 (4): 809–845. 2007. ISSN 0036-4037. OCLC 8772995173.
- “A Lockean Theory of Intellectual Property Revisited." San Diego Law Review. 50 (2012): 1070-1103.
- “Free Speech, Privacy, and Autonomy." Social Philosophy and Policy. 37 (2021): 31-51.
- “Taxation, Forced Labor, and Theft: Why Taxation is 'On a Par' with Forced Labor.” Southern Journal of Philosophy. 58 (2020): 362-385. https://doi.org/10.1111/sjp.12395
- “Privacy, Security, and Government Surveillance: WikiLeaks and the New Accountability.” Public Affairs Quarterly. 25 (2011): 141-156.
- “Owning Genetic Information and Gene Enhancement Techniques: Why Privacy and Property May Undermine Social Control of the Human Genome.” Bioethics. 14 (2000): 97-119. https://doi.org/10.1111/1467-8519.00184

==== Encyclopedic ====
- Moore, Adam; Himma, Ken (2011-03-08). "Intellectual Property". Stanford Encyclopedia of Philosophy.

=== Thesis ===
- A Lockean theory of intellectual property (PhD). Columbus: Ohio State University. 1997. OCLC 871223447 – via OhioLINK Electronic Theses & Dissertations (ETD) Center.
