= Journal of Value Inquiry =

- Discipline: Ethics
- Language: English

Publication details
- History: 1967–present
- Publisher: Springer
- Impact factor: 0.373 (2015)

Standard abbreviations
- ISO 4: J. Value Inq.

Indexing
- CODEN: JVINEP
- ISSN: 0022-5363 (print); 1573-0492 (web)
- LCCN: sf81005105
- OCLC no.: 863228169

Links
- Journal homepage; Online access

The Journal of Value Inquiry is a peer-reviewed philosophical journal focused on value studies. It was founded in 1967 by James Wilbur. The journal publishes essays, letters, book reviews, interviews, dialogues, reports, and news.

According to the Journal Citation Reports, the journal has a 2015 impact factor of 0.373, ranking it 43rd out of 51 journals in the category "Ethics".

== See also ==
- List of ethics journals
