= Renewable energy in the United States =

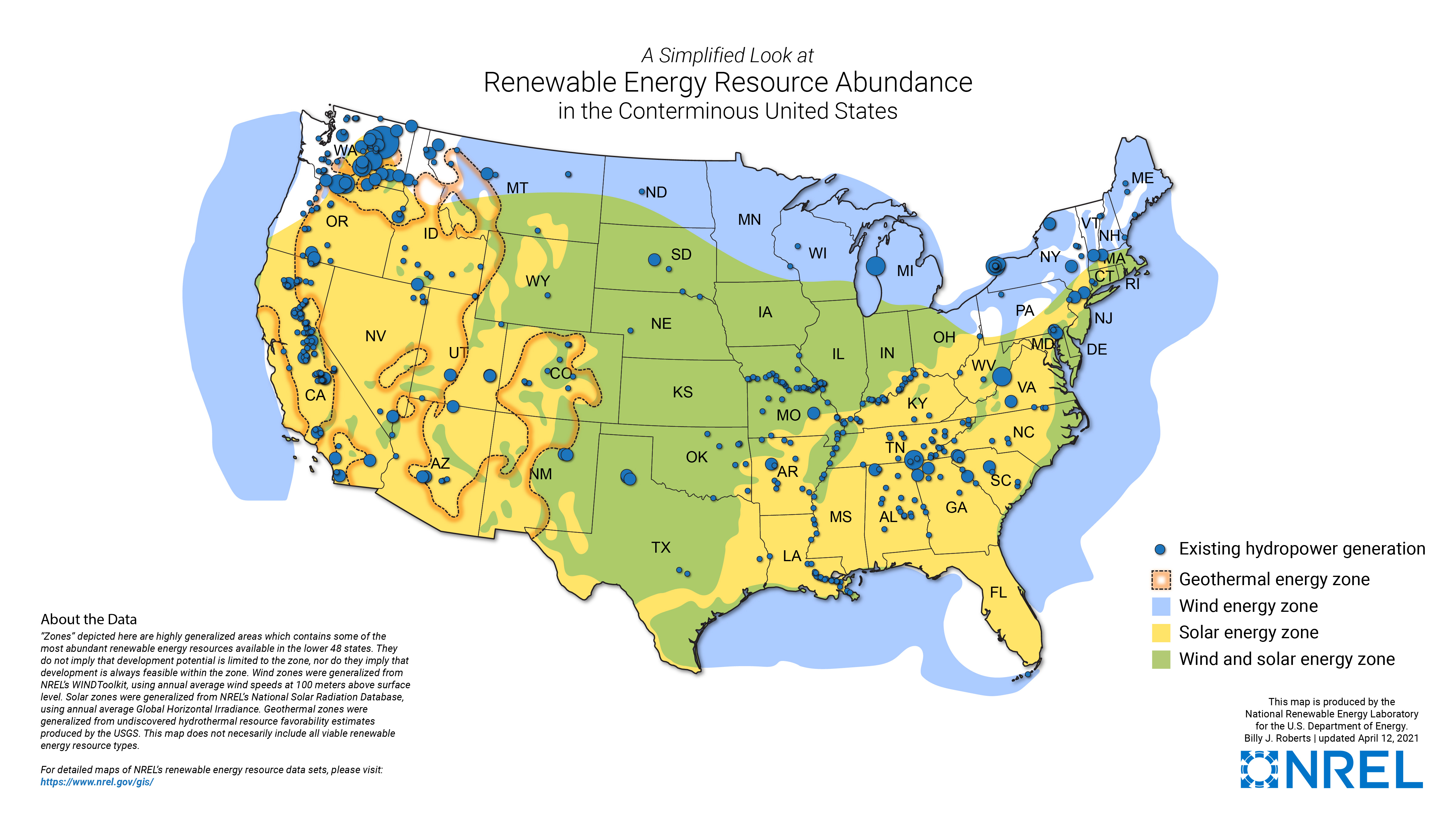
A map of major renewable energy resources in the contiguous United States.

Renewable energy sources in 2022. Renewables were 8.4% of total energy, or 8.3 quads.
1. Biomass (61.1%)
2. Wind (17.8%)
3. Hydro (10.5%)
4. Solar (9.20%)
5. Geothermal (1.40%)
Renewable electricity sources in 2022. Renewables were 21% of total electricity, or 907 TWh.
1. Wind (45.1%)
2. Hydro (26.5%)
3. Solar (21.3%)
4. Biomass (5.40%)
5. Geothermal (1.70%)

According to data from the US Energy Information Administration, renewable energy accounted for 17.8% of total primary energy production and 22.7% of total utility-scale electricity generation in the United States in 2024, up from 8.4% and 21% in 2022.

Since 2019, wind power has been the largest producer of renewable electricity in the country. In 2025, wind generated about 464 terawatt-hours and utility-scale solar generated about 296 terawatt-hours. Together, these utility-scale sources accounted for 17% of U.S. electricity generation. Including small-scale solar, wind and solar supplied 19% of total net generation. By January 2023, the United States nameplate generating capacity for wind power was 141.3 gigawatts (GW). Texas remained firmly established as the leader in wind power deployment, followed by Iowa and Oklahoma as of the first quarter of 2023.

The United States is the fourth largest producer of hydroelectricity in the world after China, Canada and Brazil.

Solar power provides a growing share of electricity in the country, with over 111.6 GW of installed capacity generating about 3.4% of the country's total electricity supply in 2022, up from 2.8% the previous year. As of 2020, more than 260,000 people worked in the solar industry and 43 states deployed net metering, where energy utilities bought back excess power generated by solar arrays. Large photovoltaic power plants in the United States include Mount Signal Solar (600 MW) and Solar Star (579 MW). Since the United States pioneered solar thermal power technology in the 1980s with Solar One, several more such power stations have been built. The largest of these solar thermal power stations are the Ivanpah Solar Power Facility (392 MW), southwest of Las Vegas, and the SEGS group of plants in the Mojave Desert, with a total generating capacity of 354 MW.

Other renewable energy sources include geothermal, with The Geysers in Northern California the largest geothermal complex in the world.

The development of renewable energy and energy efficiency marked "a new era of energy exploration" in the United States, according to President Barack Obama in 2009. In a joint address to the Congress on February 24, 2009, President Obama called for doubling renewable energy within the following three years. Renewable energy reached a major milestone in the first quarter of 2011, when it contributed 11.7% of total national energy production (660 TWh), surpassing energy production from nuclear power (620 TWh) for the first time since 1997. In his 2012 State of the Union address, President Barack Obama restated his commitment to renewable energy and mentioned the long-standing Interior Department commitment to permit 10 GW of renewable energy projects on public land in 2012. Under President Joe Biden, Congress increased that goal to 25 GW by 2025. As of May 2023, the Bureau of Land Management has approved projects meeting approximately 37% of that goal.

In 2022 the U.S. Energy Information Administration projected that renewable energy sources would supply 44% of U.S. energy by 2050 at which time it would by the largest electricity generation source in the U.S. Much of this increase in renewable energy would be driven by the increased adoption of solar energy.

== Rationale for renewables ==
Renewable energy technologies encompass a broad, diverse array of technologies, including solar photovoltaics, solar thermal power plants and heating/cooling systems, wind farms, hydroelectricity, geothermal power plants, and ocean power systems and the use of biomass.

The report Outlook On Renewable Energy In America explains that America needs renewable energy, for many reasons:

America needs energy that is secure, reliable, improves public health, protects the environment, addresses climate change, creates jobs, and provides technological leadership. America needs renewable energy. If renewable energy is to be developed to its full potential, America will need coordinated, sustained federal and state policies that expand renewable energy markets; promote and deploy new technology; and provide appropriate opportunities to encourage renewable energy use in all critical energy market sectors: wholesale and distributed electricity generation, thermal energy applications, and transportation.

Another benefit of some renewable energy technologies, like wind and solar photovoltaics (PV) is that they require little or no water to generate electricity whereas thermoelectric (fossil fuel–based) power plants require vast amounts of water for operation.

In 2009, President Barack Obama in the inaugural address called for the expanded use of renewable energy to meet the twin challenges of energy security and climate change. Those were the first references ever to the nation's energy use, to renewable resources, and to climate change in an inauguration speech of a United States president. President Obama looked to the near future, saying that as a nation, the United States will "harness the sun and the winds and the soil to fuel our cars and run our factories."

Obama's New Energy For America plan called for a federal investment of $150 billion over the next decade to catalyze private efforts to build a sustainable energy future. Specifically, the plan calls for renewable energy to supply 10% of the nation's electricity by 2012, rising to 25% by 2025.

In his joint address to Congress in 2009, Obama stated that: "We know the country that harnesses the power of clean, renewable energy will lead the 21st century.... Thanks to our recovery plan, we will double this nation's supply of renewable energy in the next three years... It is time for America to lead again".

As of 2011, new evidence has emerged that there are considerable risks associated with traditional energy sources, and that major changes to the mix of energy technologies is needed:

Several mining tragedies globally have underscored the human toll of the coal supply chain. New EPA initiatives targeting air toxins, coal ash, and effluent releases highlight the environmental impacts of coal and the cost of addressing them with control technologies. The use of fracking in natural gas exploration is coming under scrutiny, with evidence of groundwater contamination and greenhouse gas emissions. Concerns are increasing about the vast amounts of water used at coal-fired and nuclear power plants, particularly in regions of the country facing water shortages. Events at the Fukushima nuclear plant have renewed doubts about the ability to operate large numbers of nuclear plants safely over the long term. Further, cost estimates for "next generation" nuclear units continue to climb, and lenders are unwilling to finance these plants without taxpayer guarantees.

A 2024 study quantifies the environmental and health gains from increased wind and solar energy use in the U.S. between 2019 and 2022, reporting a reduction of 900 million metric tons of CO_{2} and an estimated $249 billion in climate and health benefits.

== Renewable energy and carbon dioxide emissions ==
Between 2010 and 2020, the cost of wind, solar, and natural gas dropped dramatically. In 2018, EIA expected that, after rising by 2.7% in 2018, U.S. energy-related carbon dioxide (CO_{2}) emissions would decrease by 2.5% in 2019 and by 1.0% in 2020 due to a shift away from coal and toward renewables and natural gas.

Renewable energy has the potential to reduce CO_{2} emissions in three key energy use sectors: transport, heating and cooling (including building heating and air conditioning, industrial heat usage, etc.), and electricity. The year 2018 had been a peak year for the use of air conditioning, which was expected to decline.

== Current trends ==
=== Renewable energy in the electricity sector ===
Growth in renewable-source electricity generation has been led by wind and solar.

New installation of wind and solar capacity surged in 2020, but was then affected by sourcing problems for solar panels, supply chain constraints, interconnection issues, and policy uncertainty.

Total wind+solar electricity generation now exceeds coal-based energy in the U.S.

Though Texas and California generate the most wind + solar power of all states, various other states generate more wind + solar power per capita.

Over centuries, energy consumption has evolved from burning wood to fossil fuels (coal, oil, natural gas), and in recent decades to using nuclear, hydroelectric and other renewable energy sources.

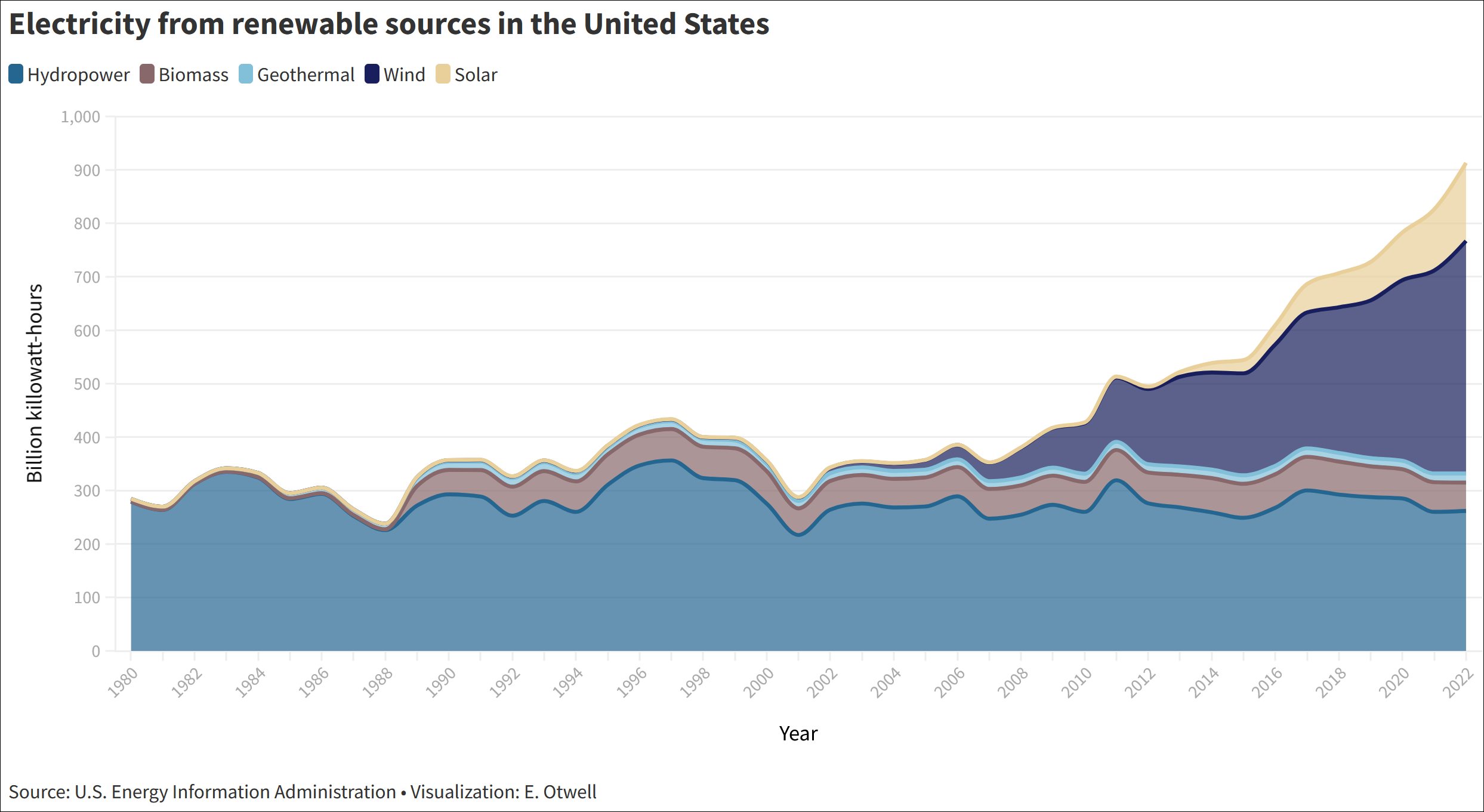
Timeline of electricity from renewable sources in the United States

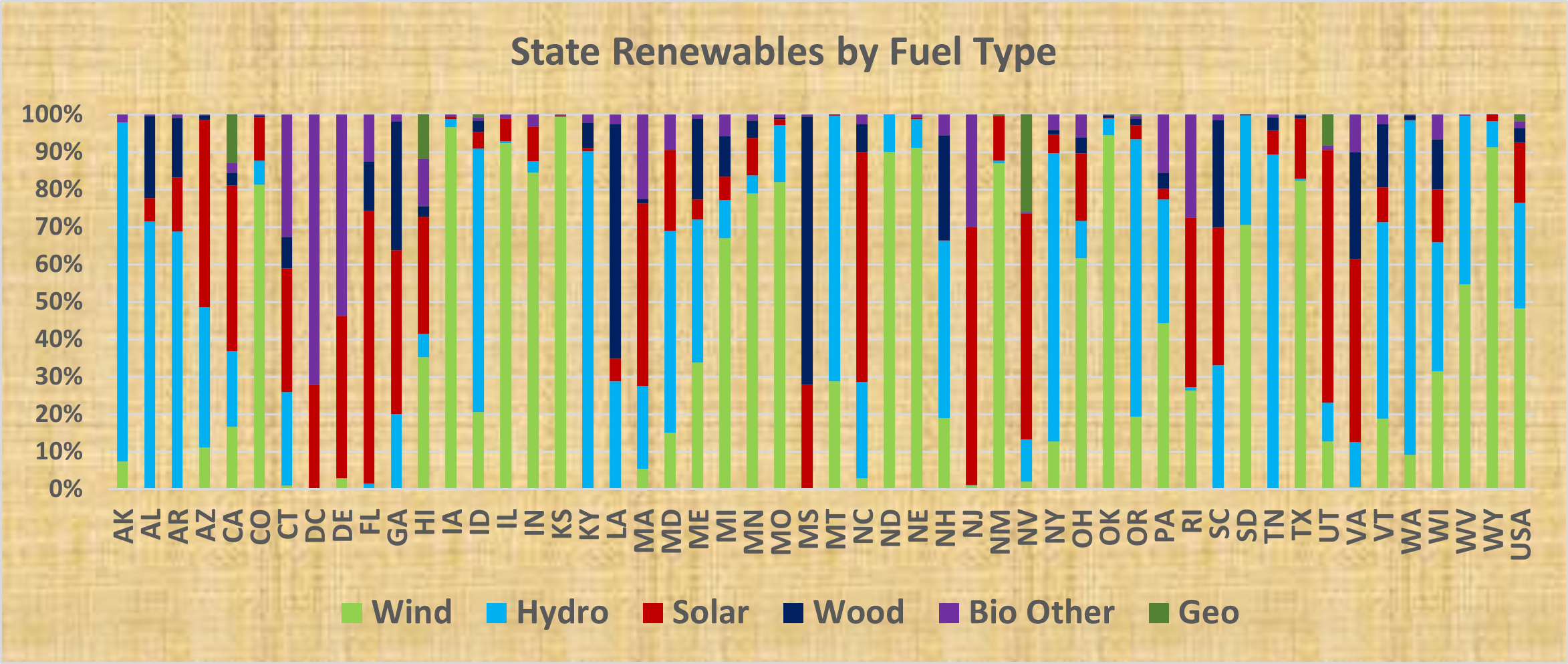
State Renewables % by Fuel Type

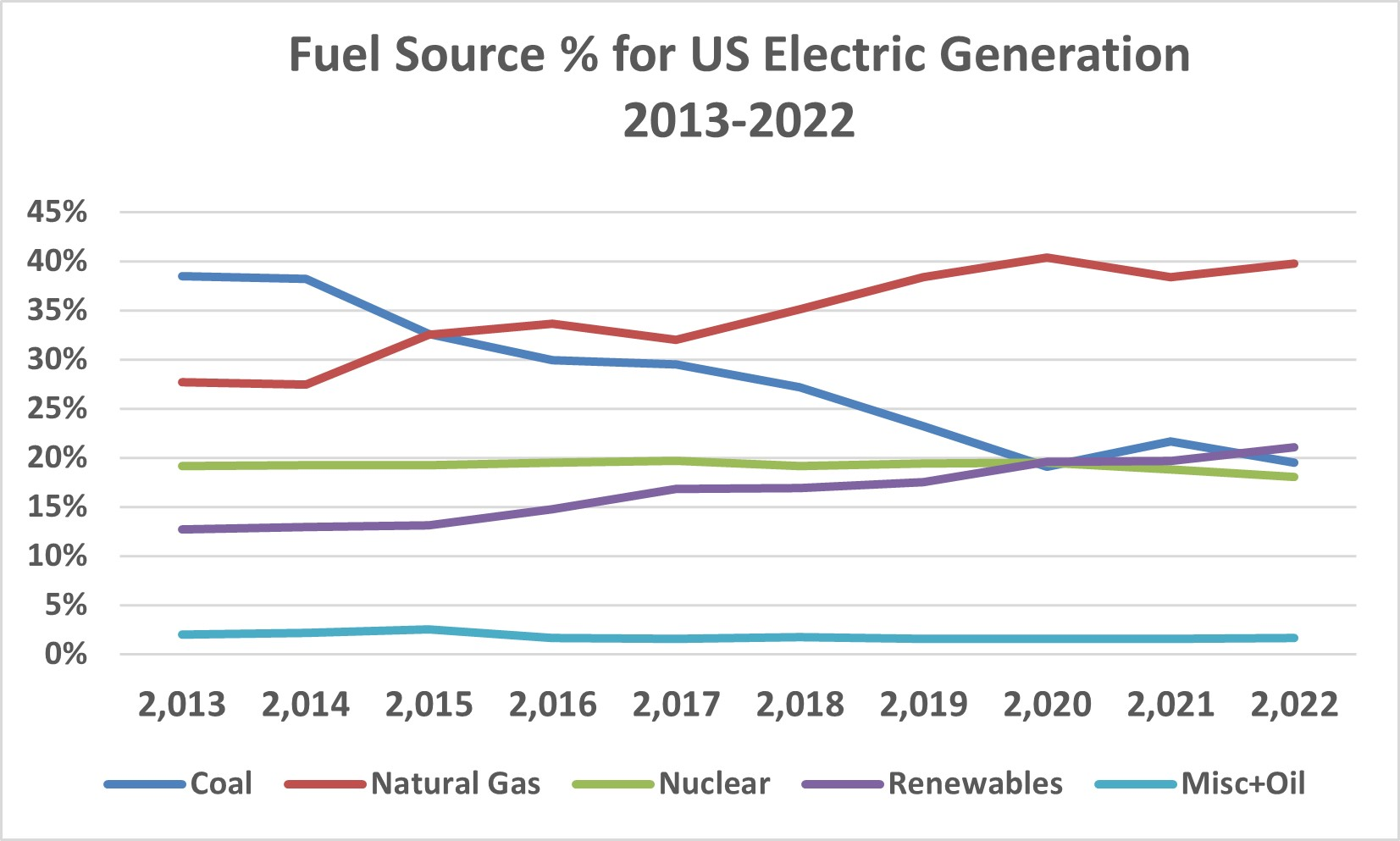
Fuel Source % for Electric Generation 2013-2022

Renewable energy accounted for 14.94% of the domestically produced electricity in 2016 in the United States. This proportion has grown from just 7.7% in 2001, although the trend is sometimes obscured by large yearly variations in hydroelectric power generation. Most of the growth since 2001 can be seen in the expansion of wind generated power, and more recently, in the growth in solar generated power. Renewable energy in California is prominent, with around 29% of electricity coming from RPS-eligible renewable sources (including hydropower).

The United States has some of the best renewable energy resources in the world, with the potential to meet a rising and significant share of the nation's energy demand. A quarter of the country's land area has winds strong enough to generate electricity at the same price as natural gas and coal. Less than 5% of the federal land that is suitable for renewable energy development is needed to achieve carbon-free electricity by 2035.

Many of the new technologies that harness renewables—including wind, solar, geothermal, and biofuels—are, or soon will be, economically competitive with the fossil fuels that meet 85% of United States energy needs. Dynamic growth rates are driving down costs and spurring rapid advances in technologies. Wind power and solar power are becoming increasingly important relative to the older and more established hydroelectric power source. By 2016 wind power covered 37.23% of total renewable electricity production against 43.62% for hydroelectric power. The remaining share of power was generated by biomass at 10.27%, solar power at 6.03% and geothermal with 2.86% of total renewable generation.

In 2015, Georgetown, Texas became one of the first American cities to be powered entirely by renewable energy, choosing to do so for financial stability reasons.

The United States consumed about 4,000 TWh of electricity in 2012, and about 30,000 TWh (98 quadrillion BTU) of primary energy. Efficiency improvements are expected to reduce usage to 15,000 TWh by 2050.

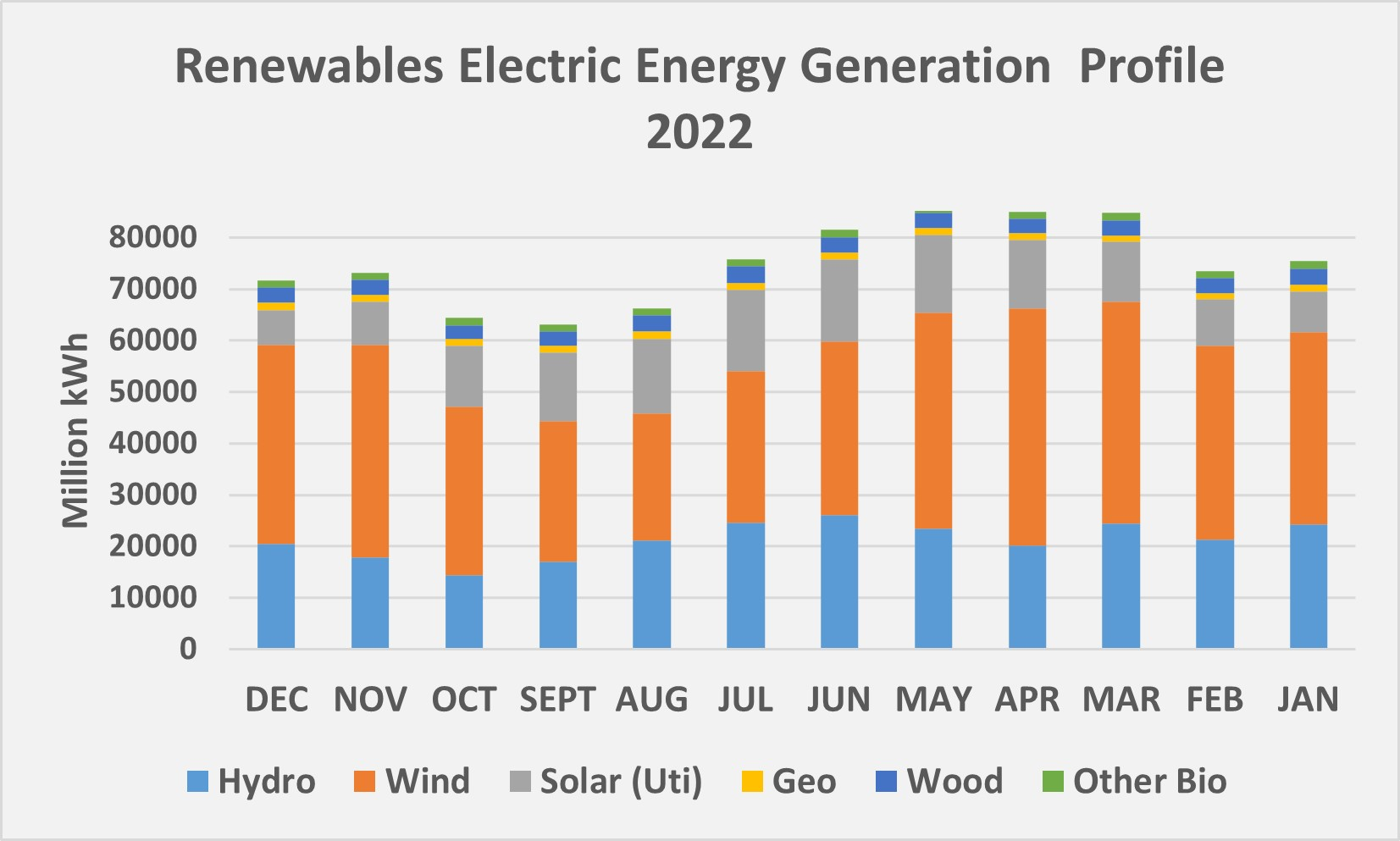
Renewables Electric Energy Generation Profile

Composition of renewable electricity production (2022)
Source	Capacity (GW)	Capacity factor	Generation (TWh)	Share of	
Source	Capacity (GW)	Capacity factor	Generation (TWh)	renew.	total
Wind	136.7	0.36	434.3	45.1%	10.1%
Hydro	80.1	0.36	254.8	26.5%	5.9%
Solar	111.2	0.24	205.1	21.3%	4.8%
Biomass	12.2	0.59	51.8	5.4%	1.2%
Geothermal	2.6	0.59	16.1	1.7%	0.4%
Total	342.8	0.31	962.1	100%	22.4%
_{Note: Solar includes estimated small scale. Biomass includes wood and wood-derived fuel, landfill gas, biogenic municipal solid waste and other waste biomass.}

== Future projections ==
Using data from Electric Power Annual 2018 capacity projections, the expected changes in generating capabilities for renewable fuel sources would result in an increase of 55.873 GW of capacity coming on-line by the beginning of 2024. This would make a total of 277.77 gigawatts of renewable available by 2024 up 23.1% from 2018. Using this generating capability and the capacity factors from 2018 data will result in a total of 798.19 terawatt-hours (TWh) of renewable electric energy in 2023. This would be up 61.84 TWh (+8.3%) from 2018.

== Renewable electricity sources ==
=== Hydroelectricity ===
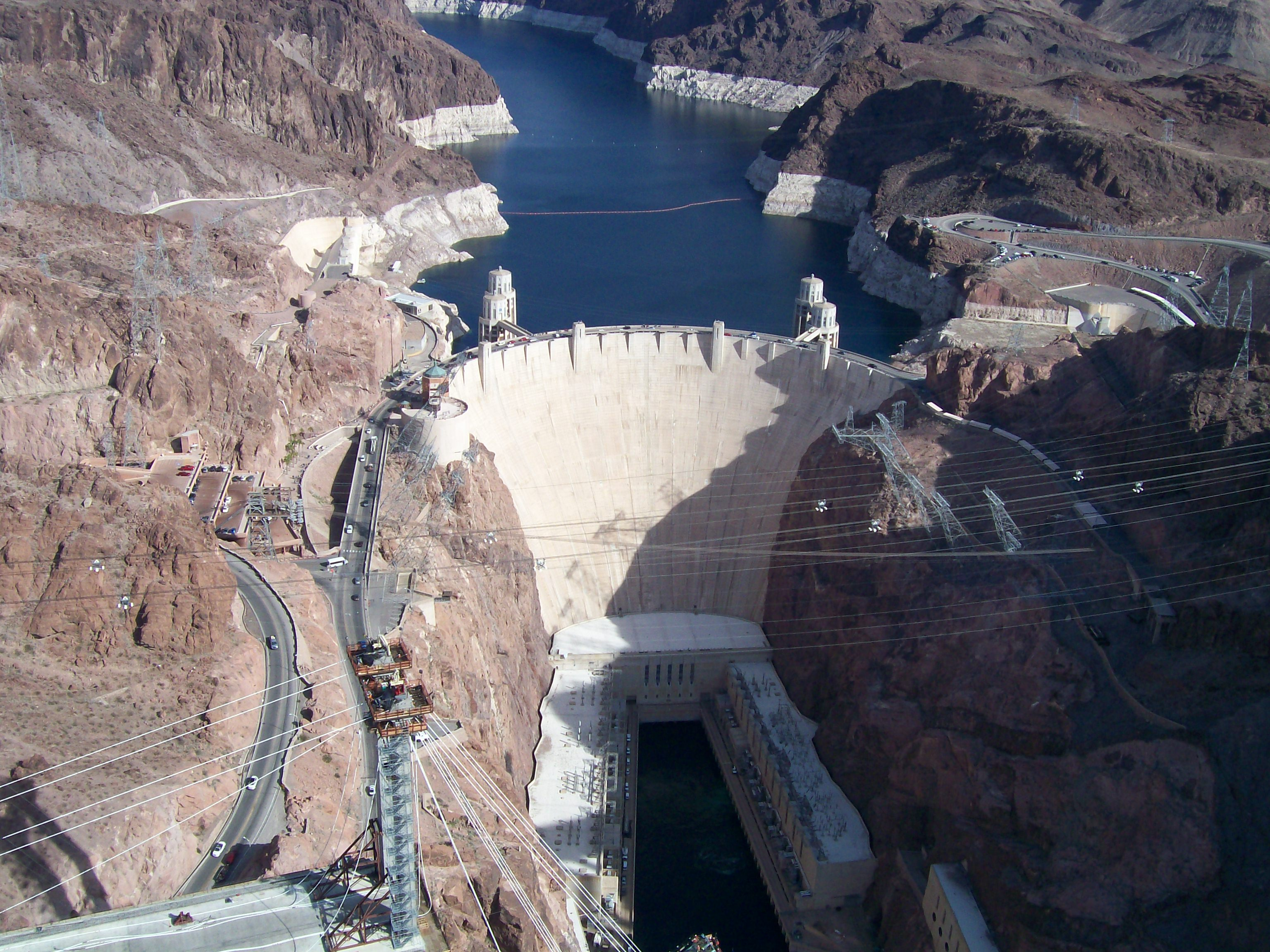
The Hoover Dam when completed in 1936 was both the world's largest electric-power generating station and the world's largest concrete structure.

Hydroelectric power was the largest producer of renewable power in the United States until 2019 when it was overtaken by wind power. It produced 254.79 TWh which was 5.94% of the nation's total electricity in 2022 and provided 26.48% of the total renewable power in the country. The United States is the third largest producer of hydroelectricity in the world after China and Brazil.

The Grand Coulee Dam is the 9th largest hydroelectric power station in the world. Another six U.S. hydroelectric plants are among the 50 largest in the world. The amount of hydroelectric power generated is strongly affected by changes in precipitation and surface runoff. Hydroelectricity projects such as Hoover Dam, Grand Coulee Dam, and the Tennessee Valley Authority have become iconic large construction projects.

Largest hydroelectric power stations
Name	Year of completion	Total capacity (MW)
Grand Coulee	1942/1980	6,809
Bath County PSP	1985	3,003
Robert Moses Niagara Power Plant	1961	2,675
Chief Joseph Dam	1958/73/79	2,620
John Day Dam	1949	2,160
The Dalles Dam	1981	2,160
Hoover Dam	1936/1961	2,080

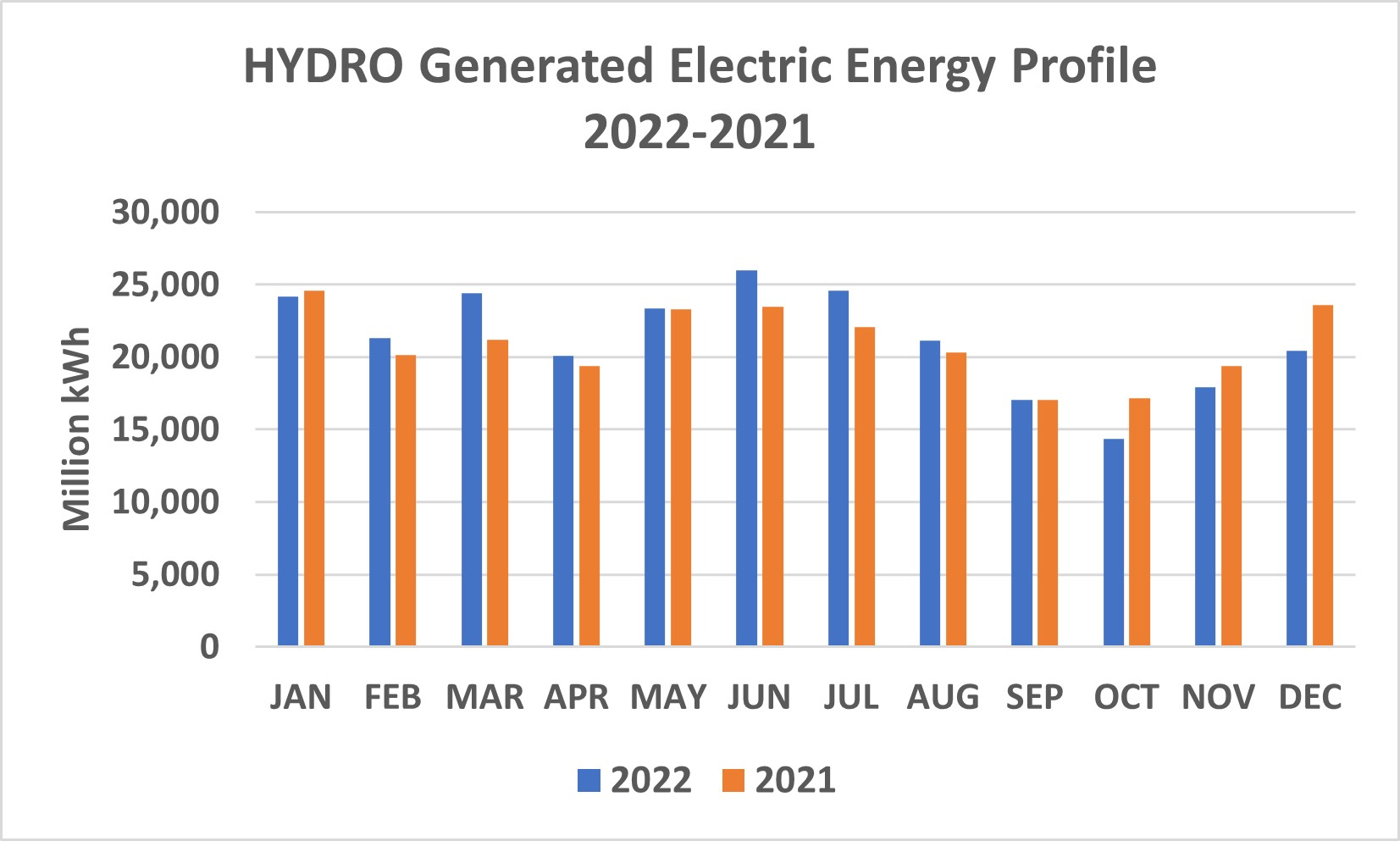
HYDRO Generated Electric Energy Profile 2022-2021

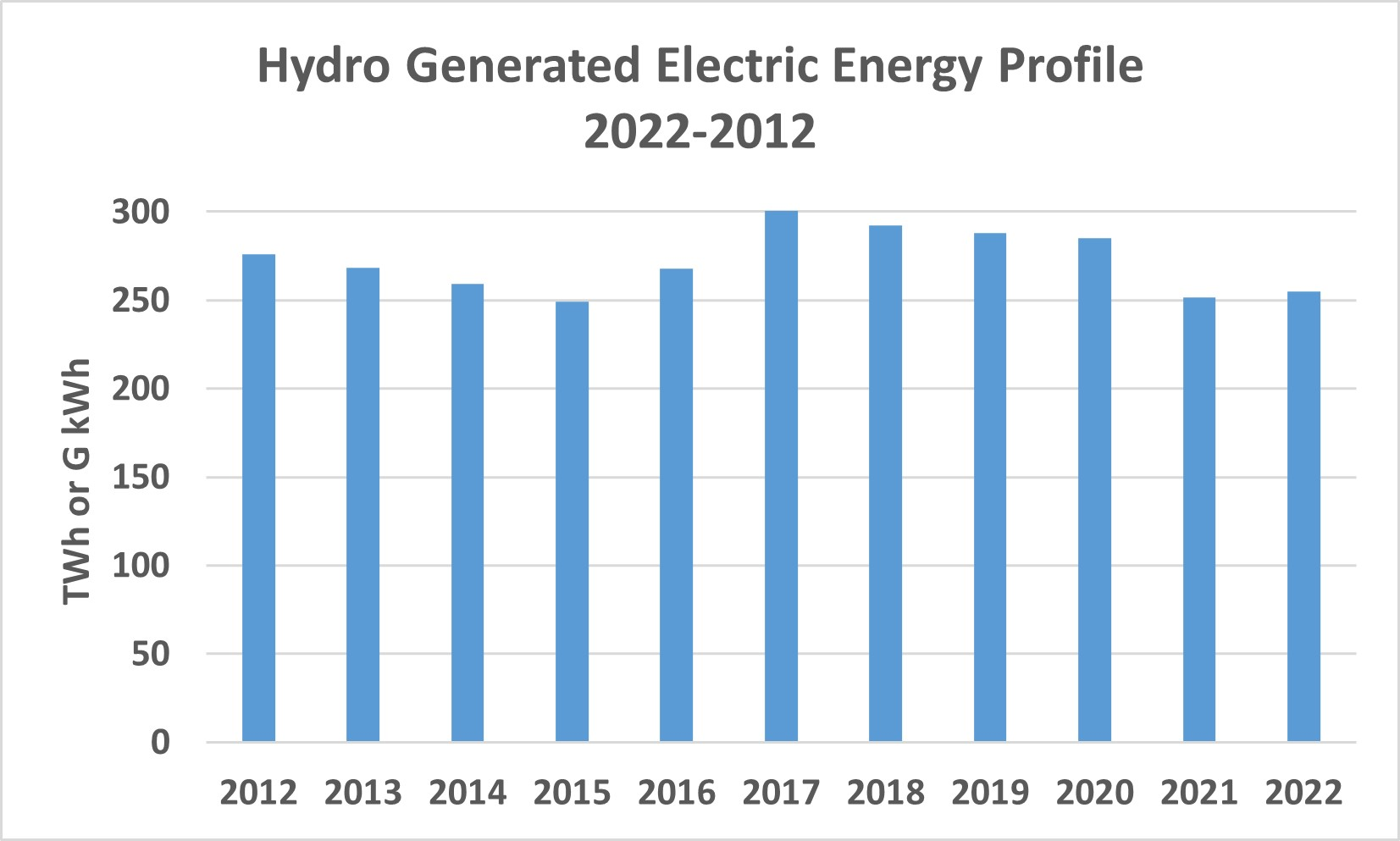
10 Yr Hydro Generated Electric Energy Profile 2022-2012

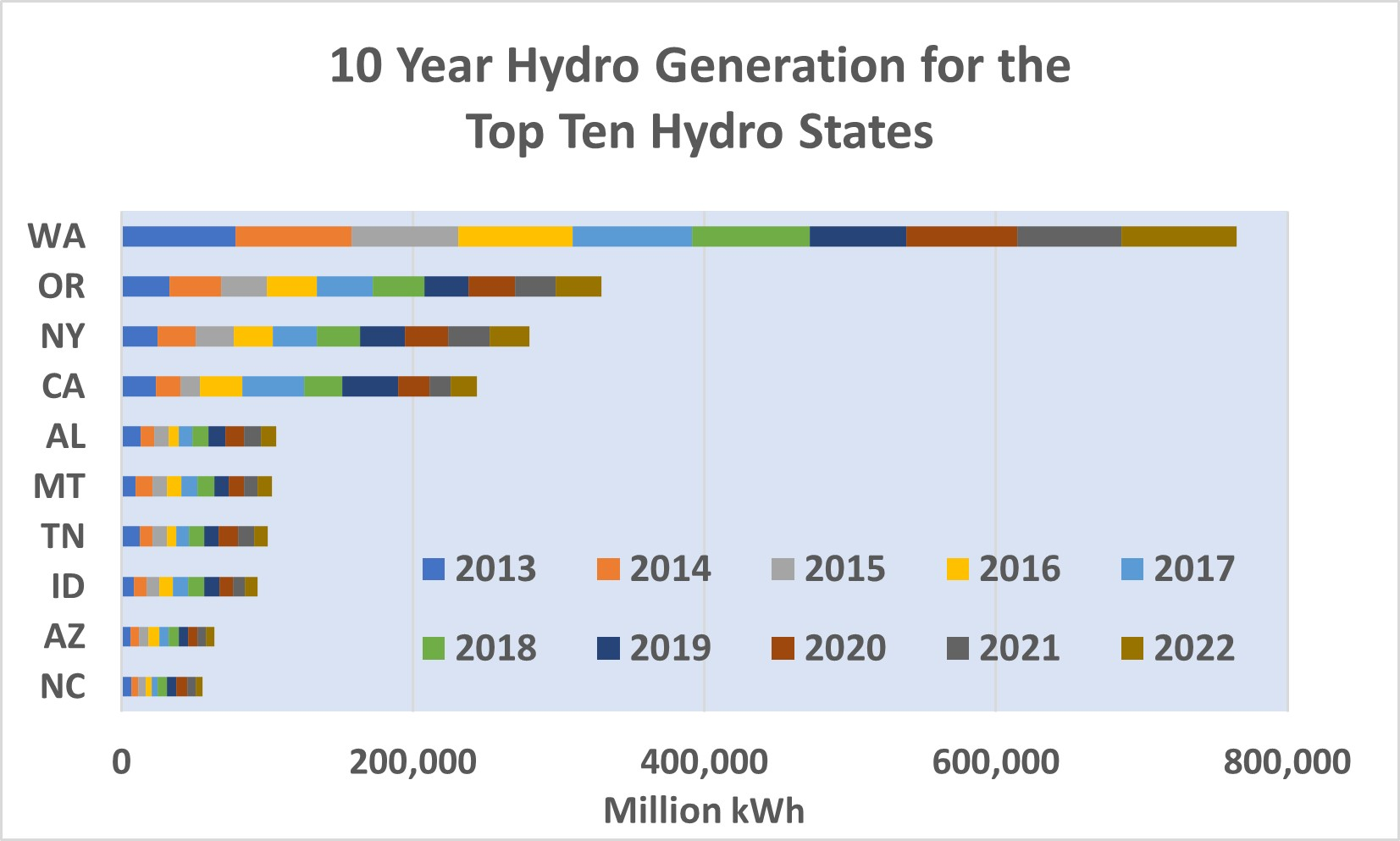
10 Year Hydro Generation for the Top Ten Hydro States

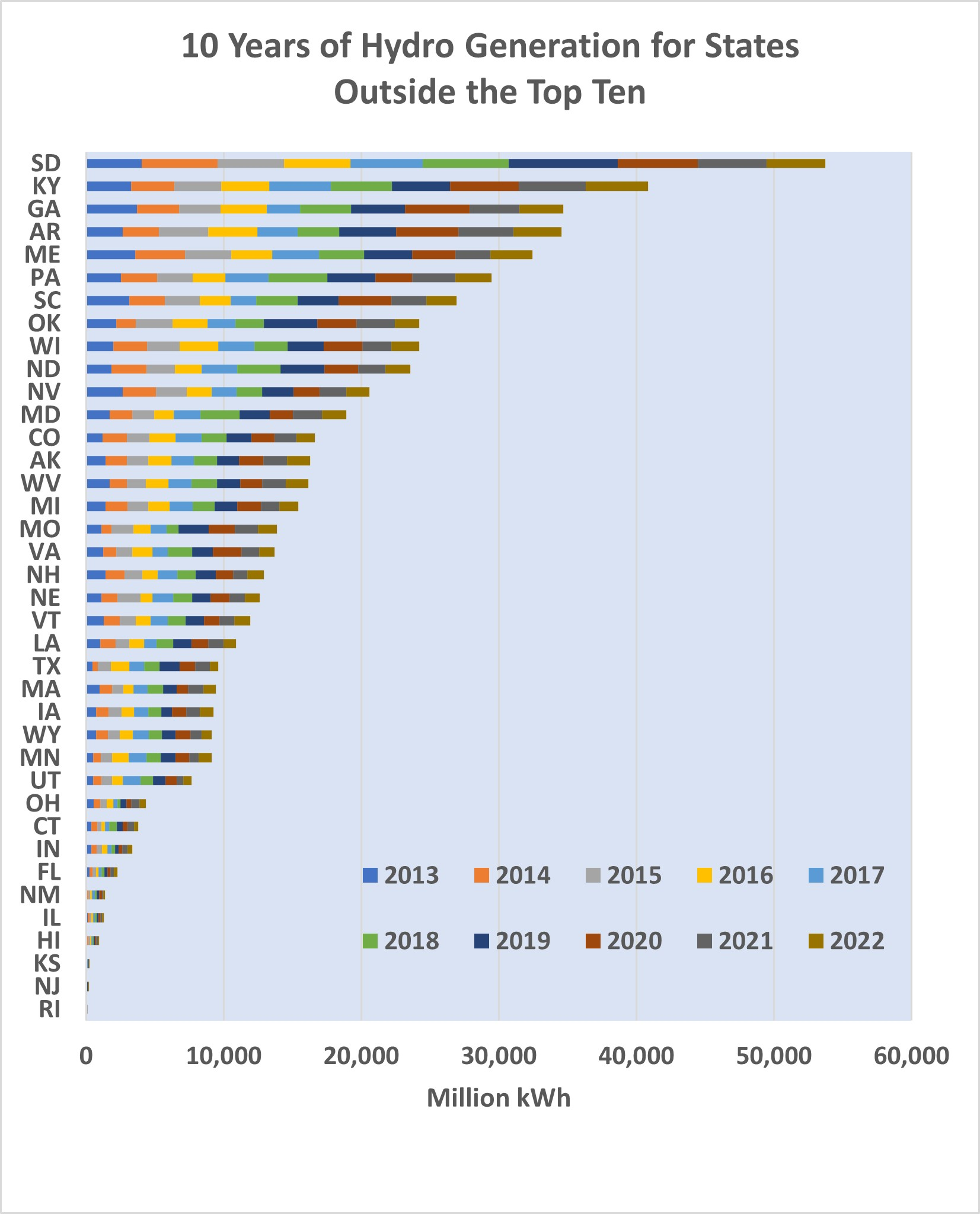
10 Years of Hydro Generation by States outside the Top Ten

=== Wind power ===
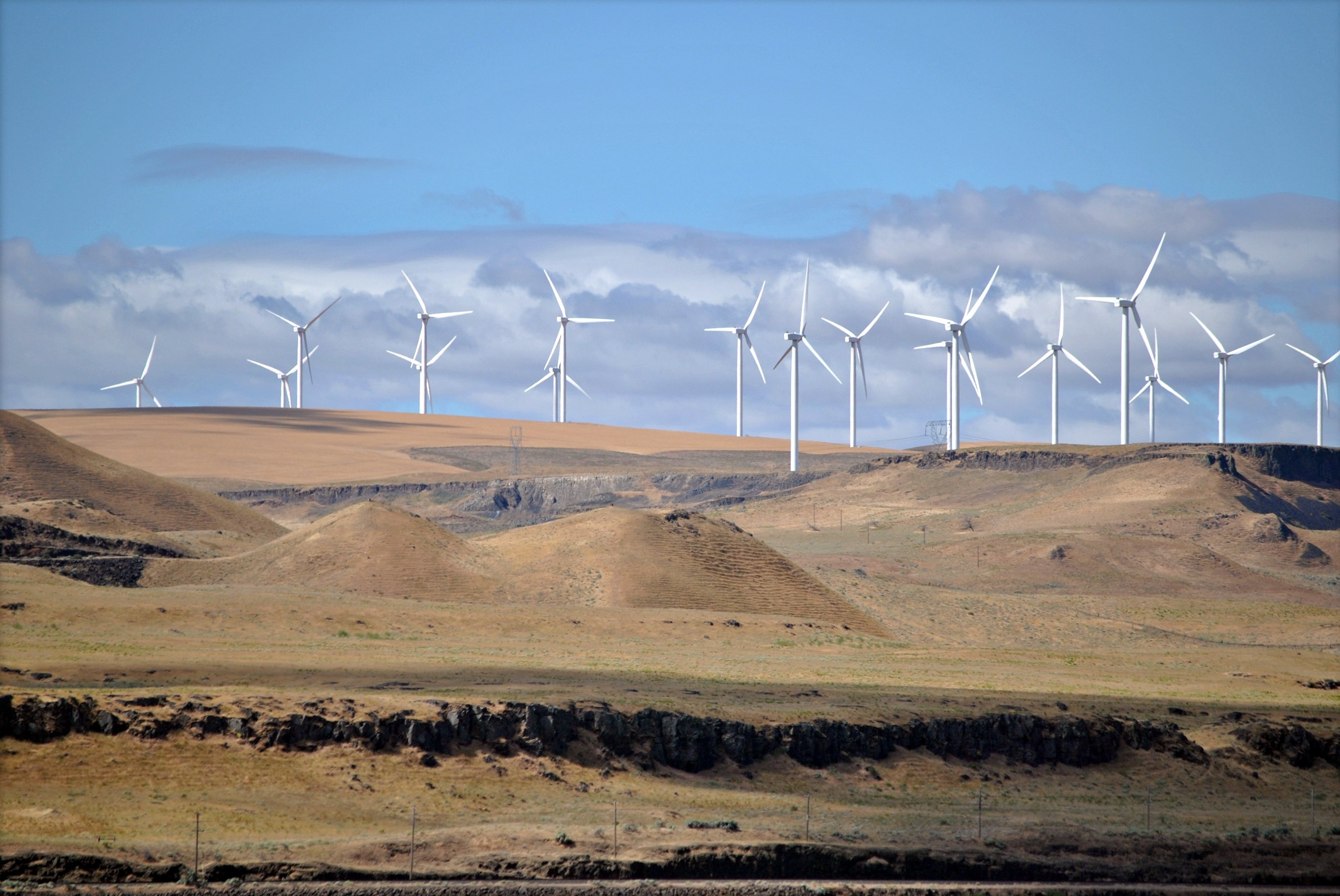
The Shepherds Flat Wind Farm is an 845 megawatt (MW) wind farm in the state of Oregon.

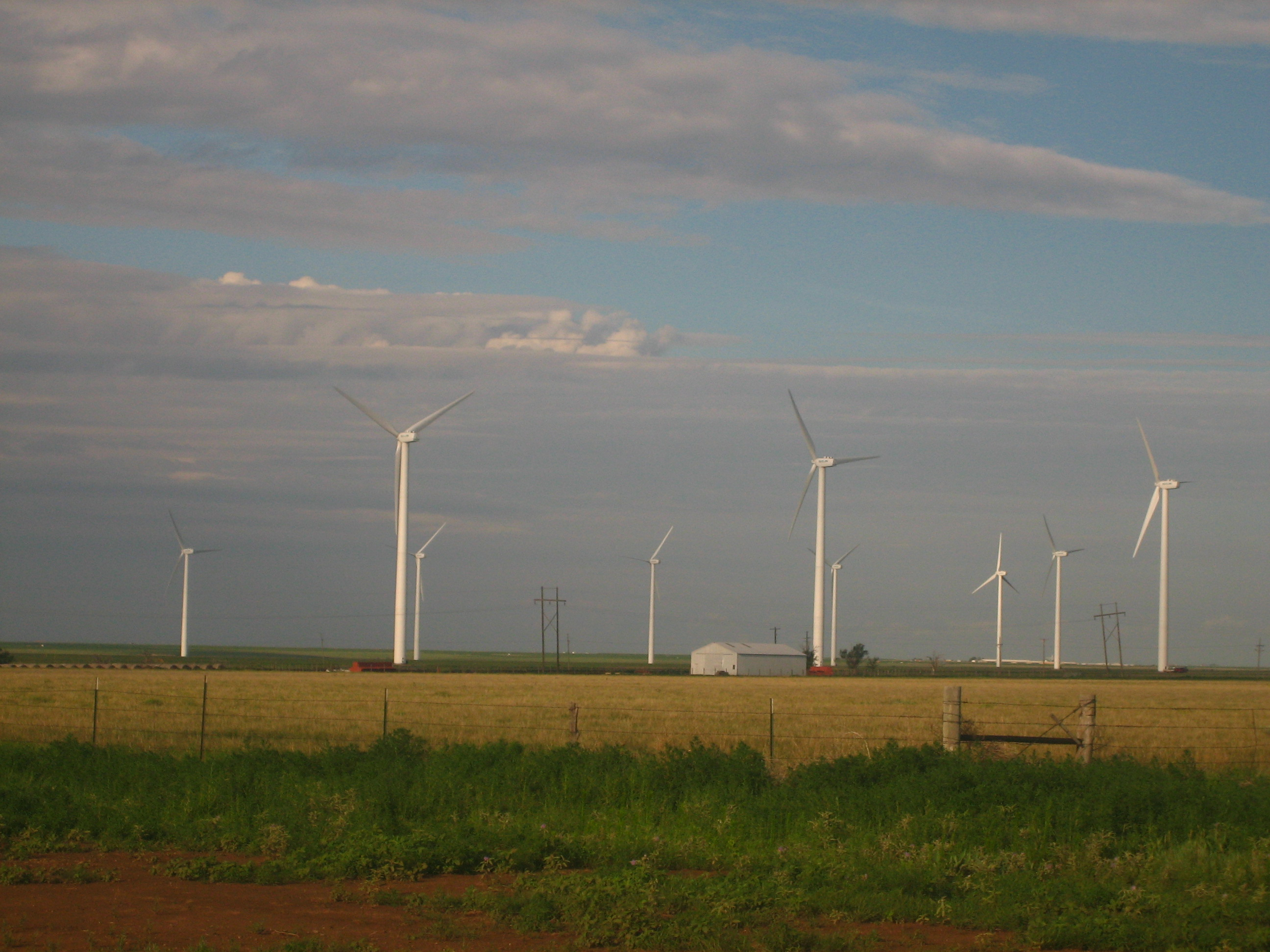
In 2008, landowners typically received $3,000 to $5,000 per year in rental income from each wind turbine. Farmers continue to grow crops or graze cattle up to the foot of the turbines.

Wind power capacity in the United States tripled from 2008 to 2016, at which time it supplied over 5% of the country's total electricity generation. Wind power overtook hydroelectric as the largest source of renewable electricity generation in 2019, and accounted for 10.25% of the country's total electricity generation by in 2022. Wind and solar accounted for two-thirds of new energy installations in the United States in 2015. United States wind power installed capacity exceeds 141 GW as of 2023. This capacity is exceeded only by China.

The 1550MW Alta Wind Energy Center is the largest wind farm in the United States and the second largest in the world behind the Gansu Wind Farm.

There were 90,000 wind operations jobs in the United States in 2015. The wind industry in the United States generates tens of thousands of jobs and billions of dollars of economic activity. Wind projects boost local tax bases, and revitalize the economy of rural communities by providing a steady income stream to farmers with wind turbines on their land. GE Energy is the largest domestic wind turbine manufacturer.

In 2013, wind power received $5.936 billion in federal funding, which is 37% of all federal funding for electricity generation.

The United States has the potential of installing 10 terawatt (TW) of onshore wind power and 4 TW of offshore wind. The U.S. Department of Energy's report 20% Wind Energy by 2030 envisioned that wind power could supply 20% of all the country's electricity, which included a contribution of 4% from offshore wind power. Additional transmission lines will need to be added, to bring power from windy states to the rest of the country. In August 2011, a coalition of 24 governors asked the Obama administration to provide a more favorable business climate for the development of wind power.

Wind power has particularly surged, with Colorado producing 16,000 GWh in 2023, a testament to the state's investment in this clean energy source.

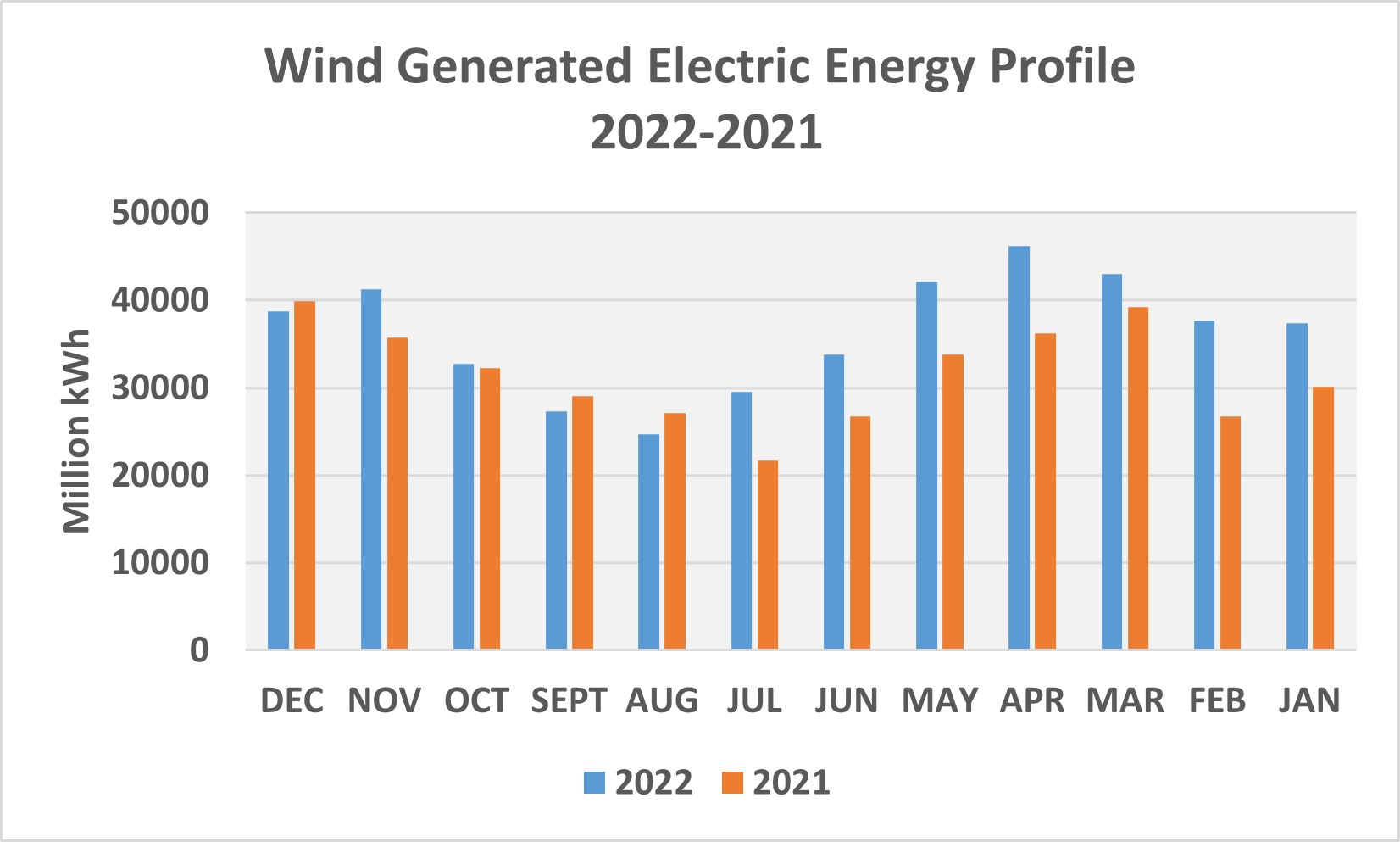
Wind Generated Electric Energy Profile 2022-2021

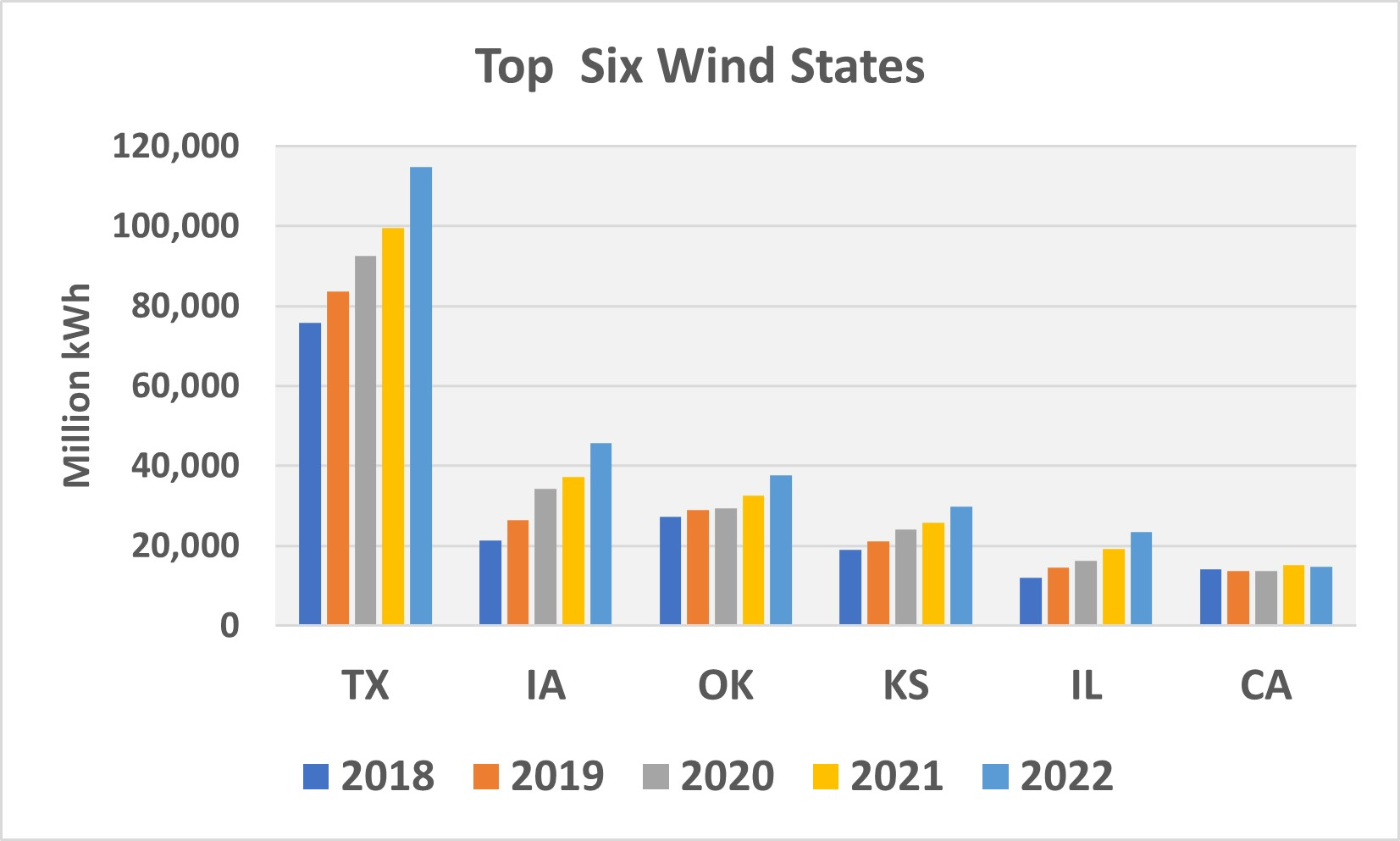
Top Six Wind States

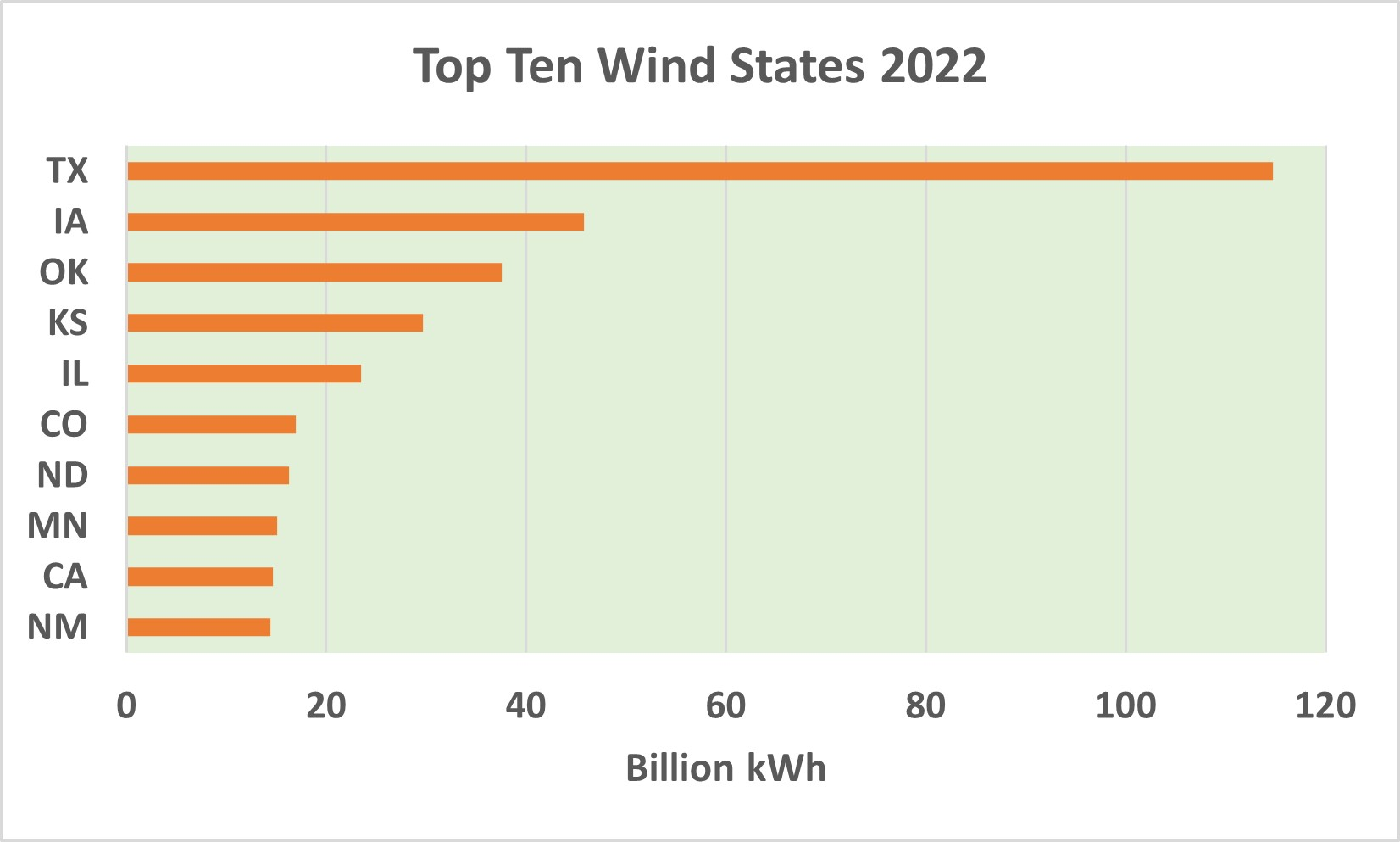
Top Ten Wind State 2022

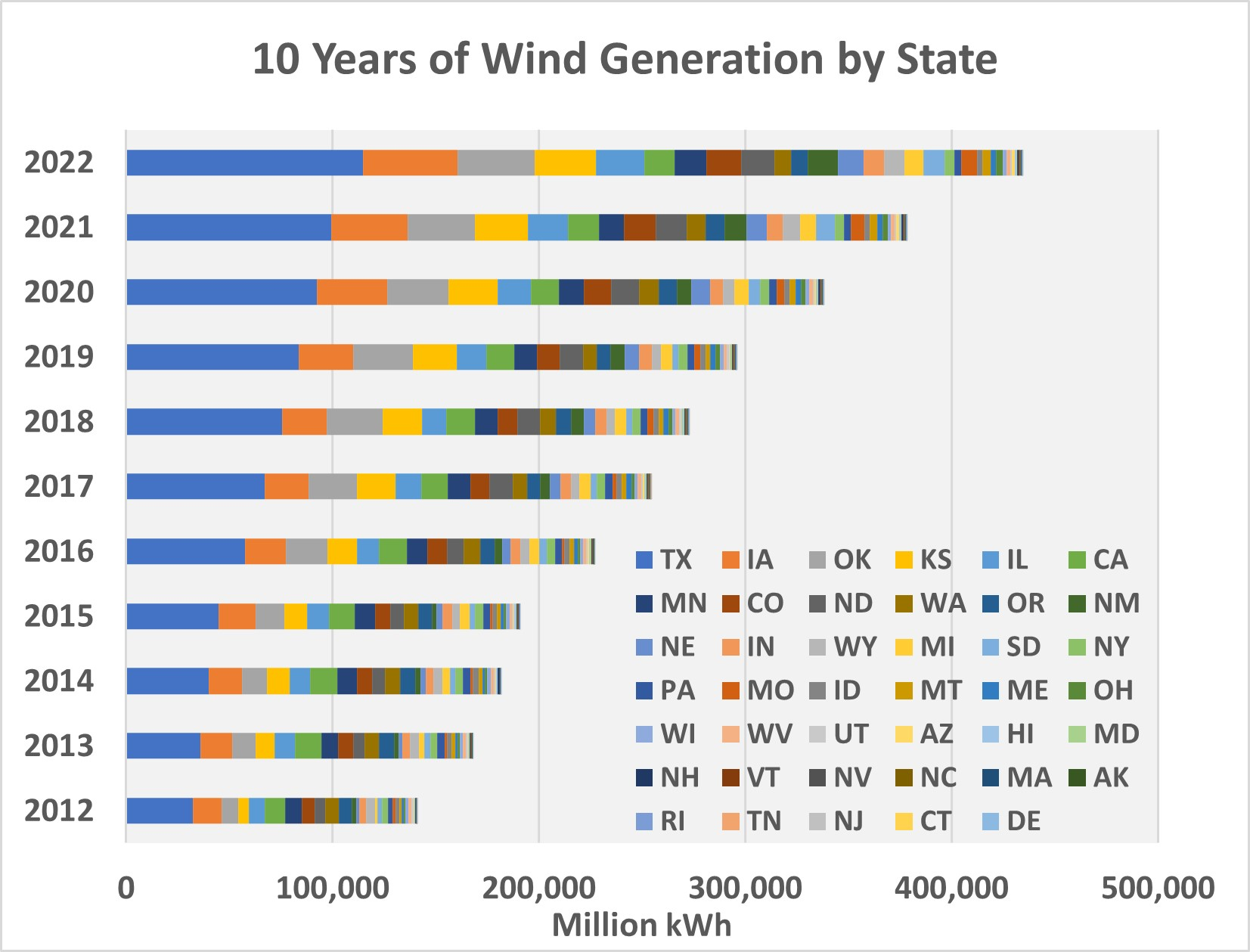
10 Years of Wind Generation by State

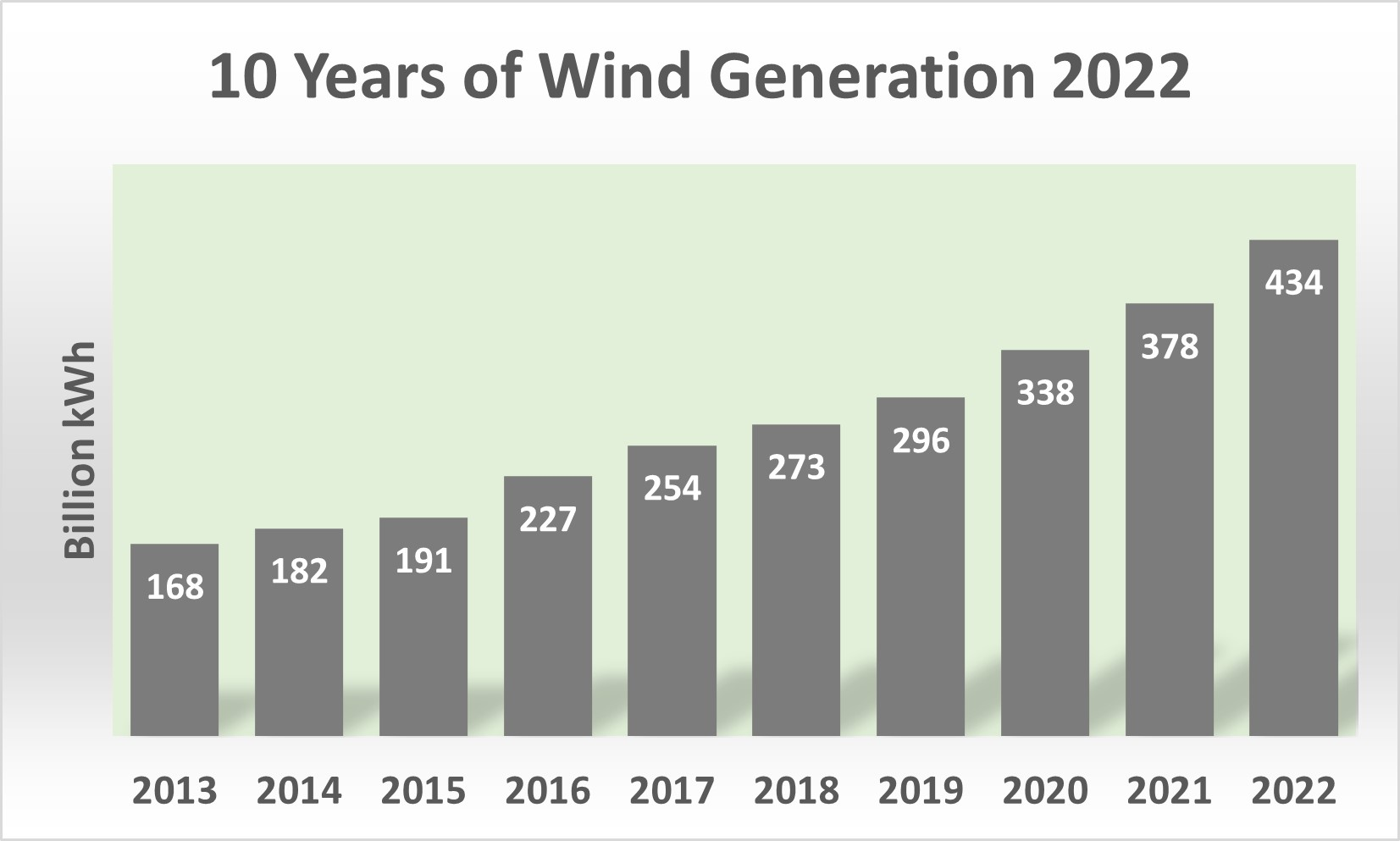
10 Years of Wind Generation 2022

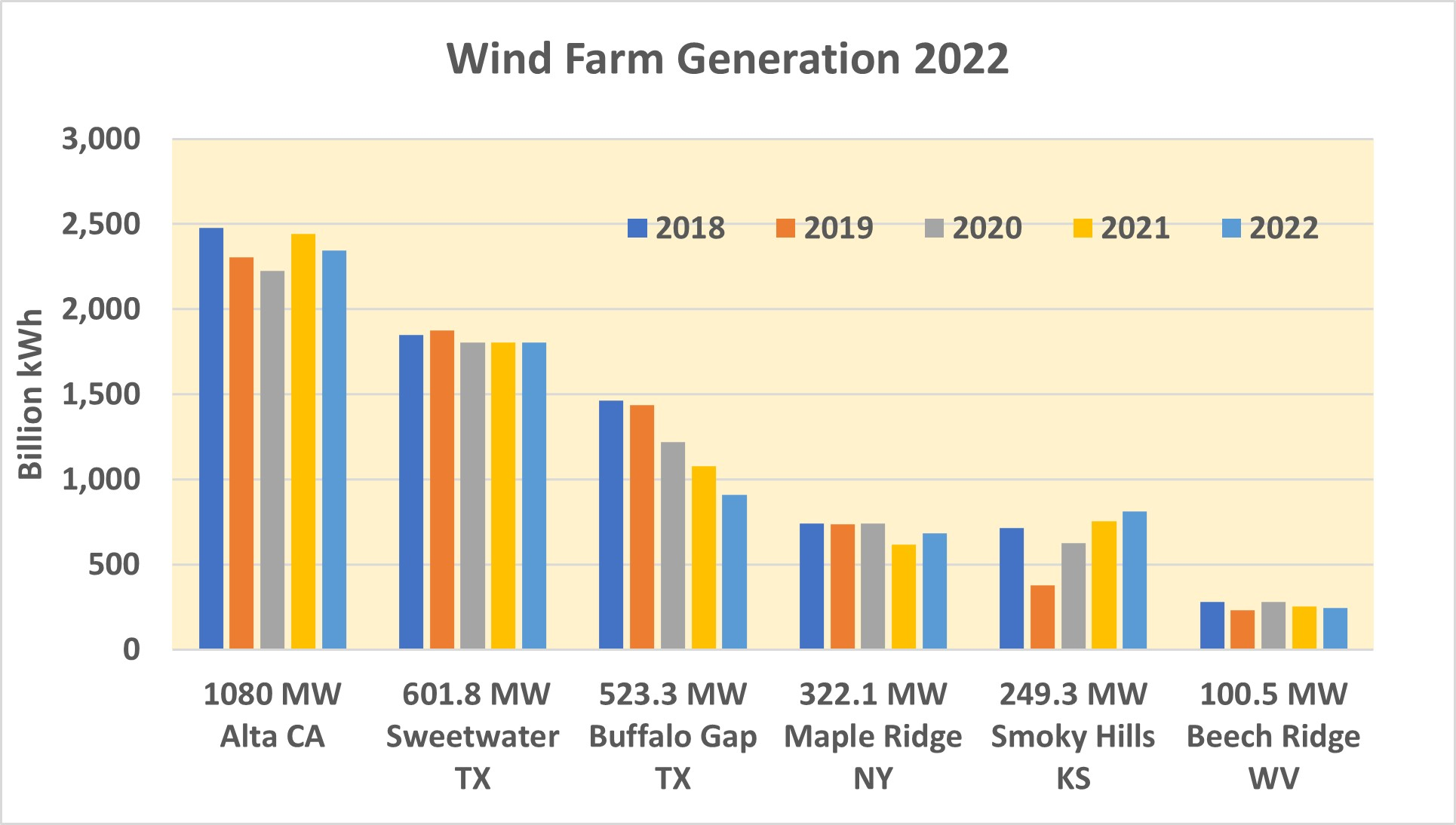
Wind Farm Generation 2022

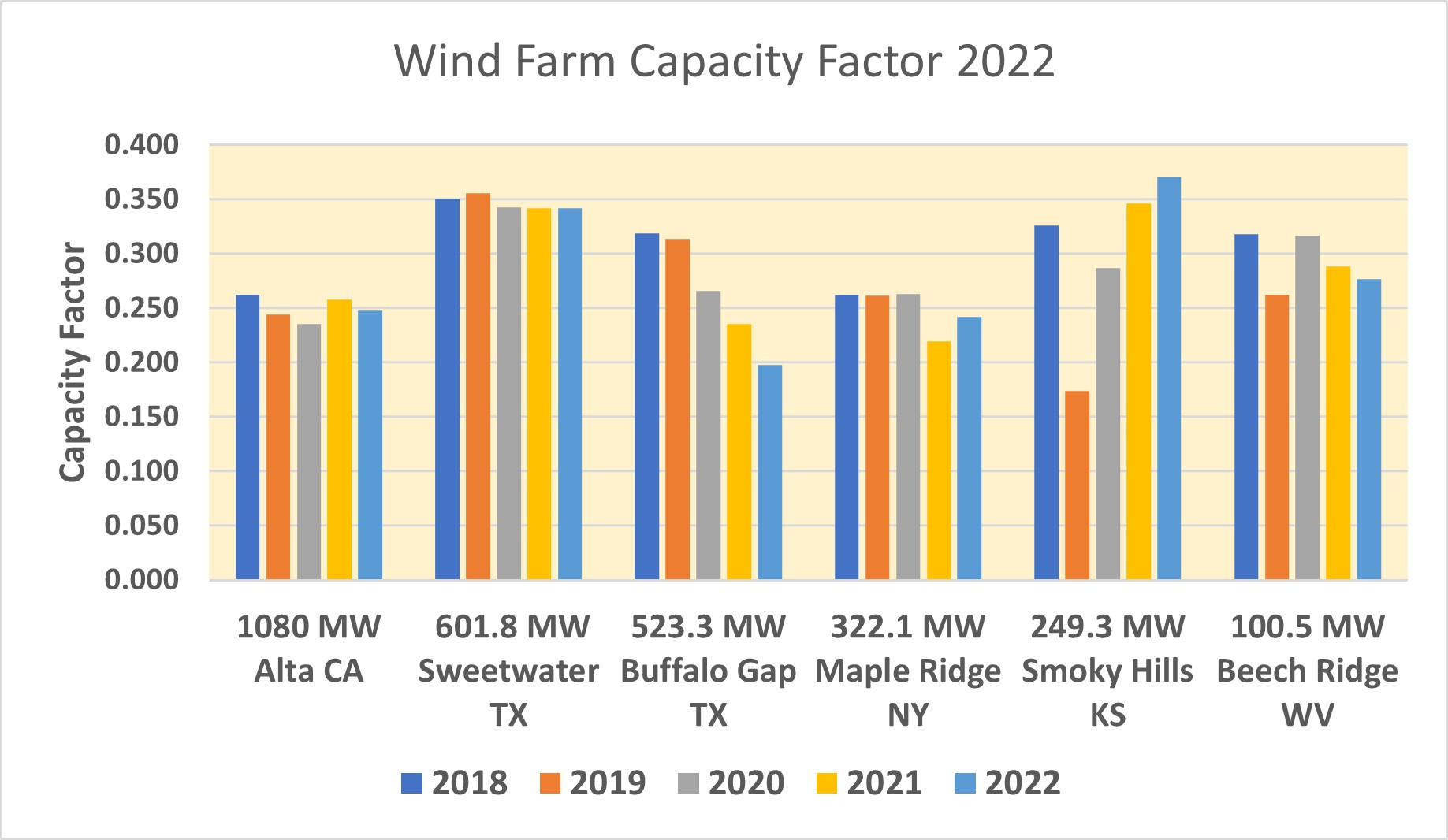
Wind Farm Capacity Factor 2022

Largest wind farms in the United States
Wind farm	State	Current capacity (MW)	Notes
Alta (Oak Creek-Mojave)	California	1,320	
Buffalo Gap Wind Farm	Texas	523	
Capricorn Ridge Wind Farm	Texas	663	
Cedar Creek Wind Farm	Colorado	551	
Fowler Ridge Wind Farm	Indiana	600	
Horse Hollow Wind Energy Center	Texas	736	
Meadow Lake Wind Farm	Indiana	500	
Roscoe Wind Farm	Texas	782	
Shepherds Flat Wind Farm	Oregon	845	
Sweetwater Wind Farm	Texas	585	

=== Solar power ===
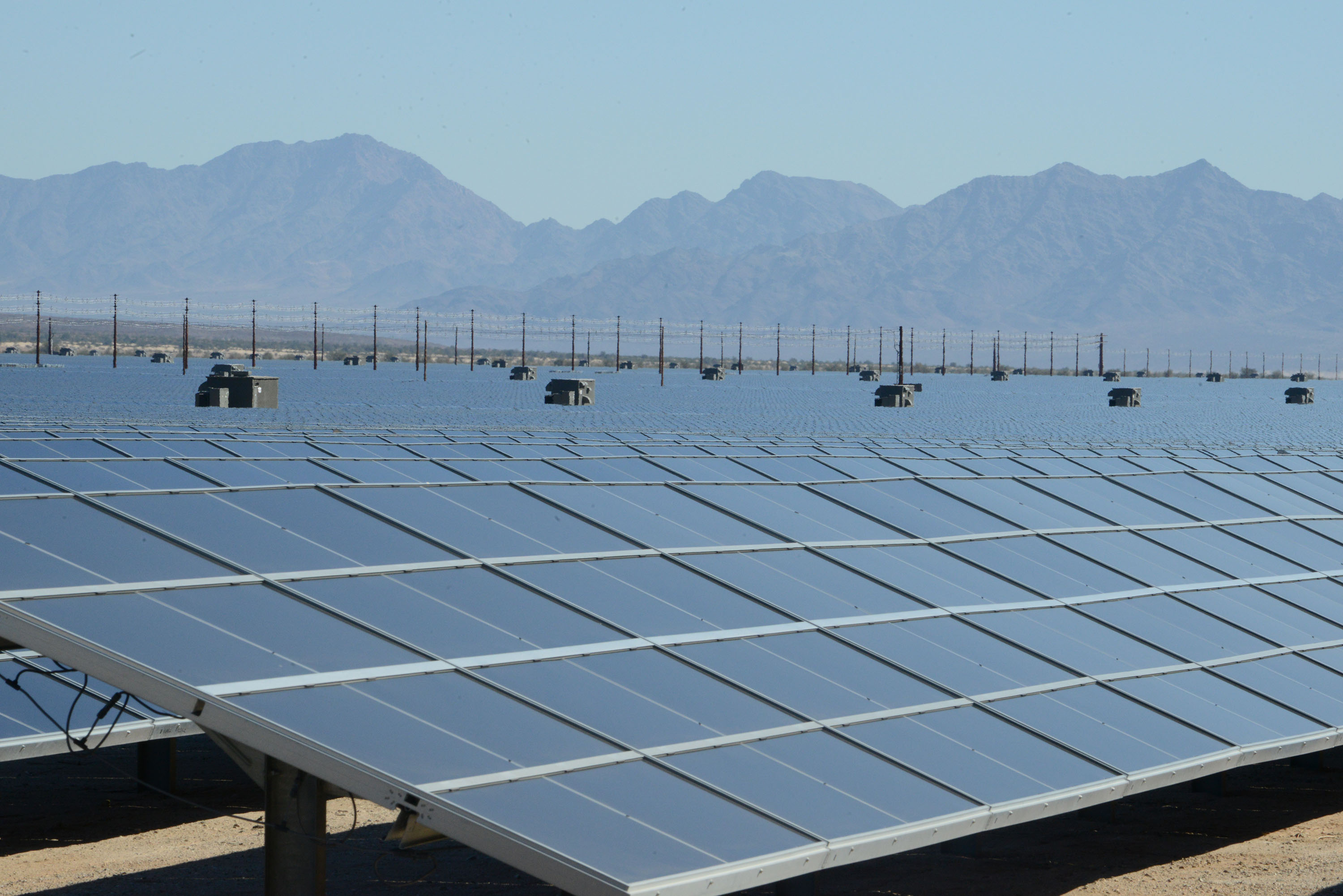
Solar arrays at the 550 MW Desert Sunlight Solar Farm

- Solar PV utility-scale
- Solar thermal utility-scale
- Estimated distributed solar PV
Monthly solar power generation in 2022 (GWh)

The United States is one of the world's largest producers of solar power. The country pioneered solar farms and many key developments in concentrated solar and photovoltaics came out of national research.

In 2022, utility scale solar contributed 145.6 TWh to the grid, with 142.6 TWh from photovoltaics and 3.0 TWh from thermal systems. In 2020, 2021, and 2022, EIA estimated that distributed solar generated 41.522 TWh, 49.164 TWh and 58.512 TWh respectively. While utility-grade systems have well documented generation, distributed systems contributions to user electric power needs are not measured or controlled. Therefore, quantitative evaluation of distributed solar to the country's electric power sector has been lacking. Recently, the Energy Information Administration has begun estimating that contribution. Before 2008, most solar-generated electric energy was from thermal systems, however by 2011 photovoltaics had overtaken thermal.

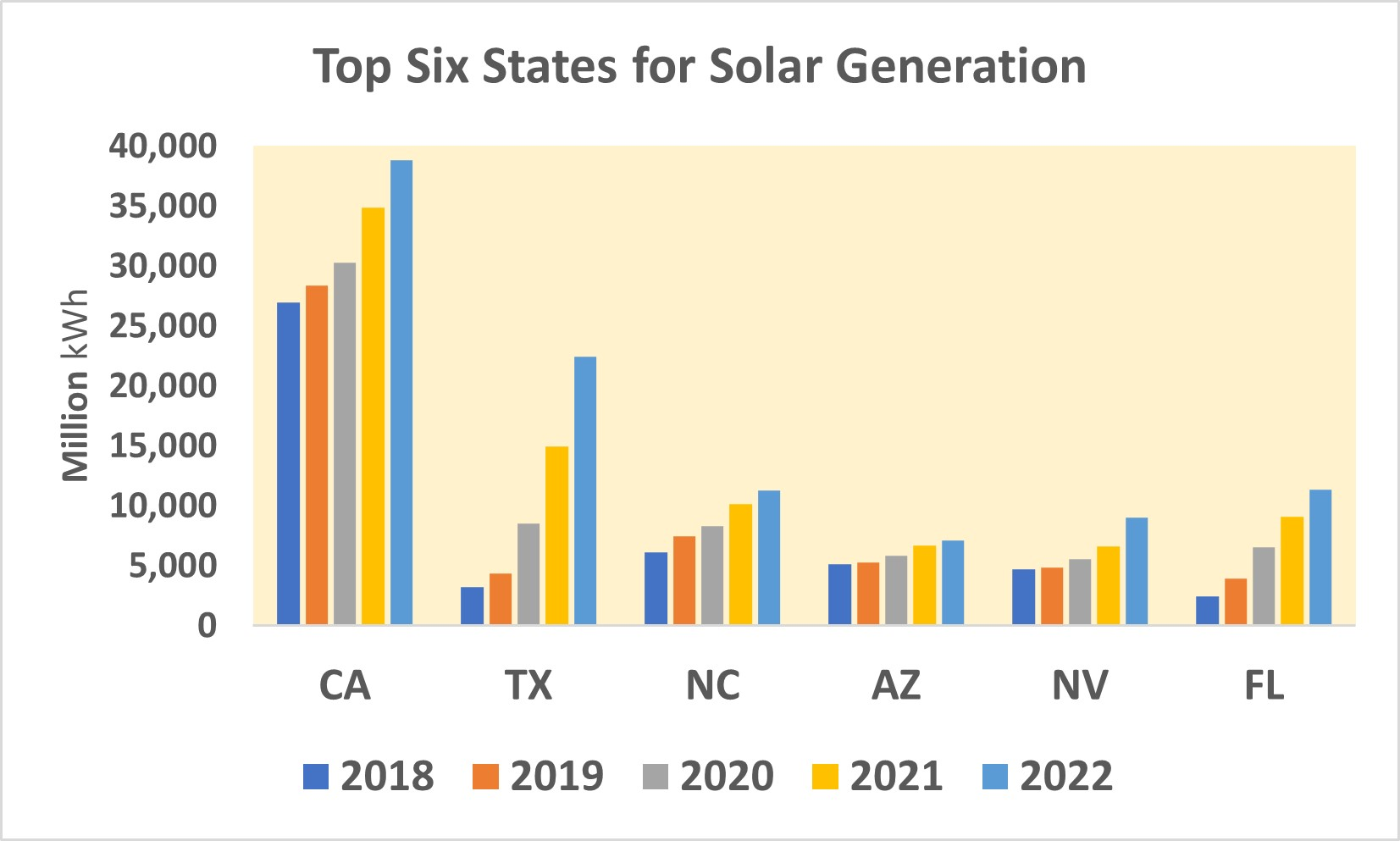
Top Six Solar States

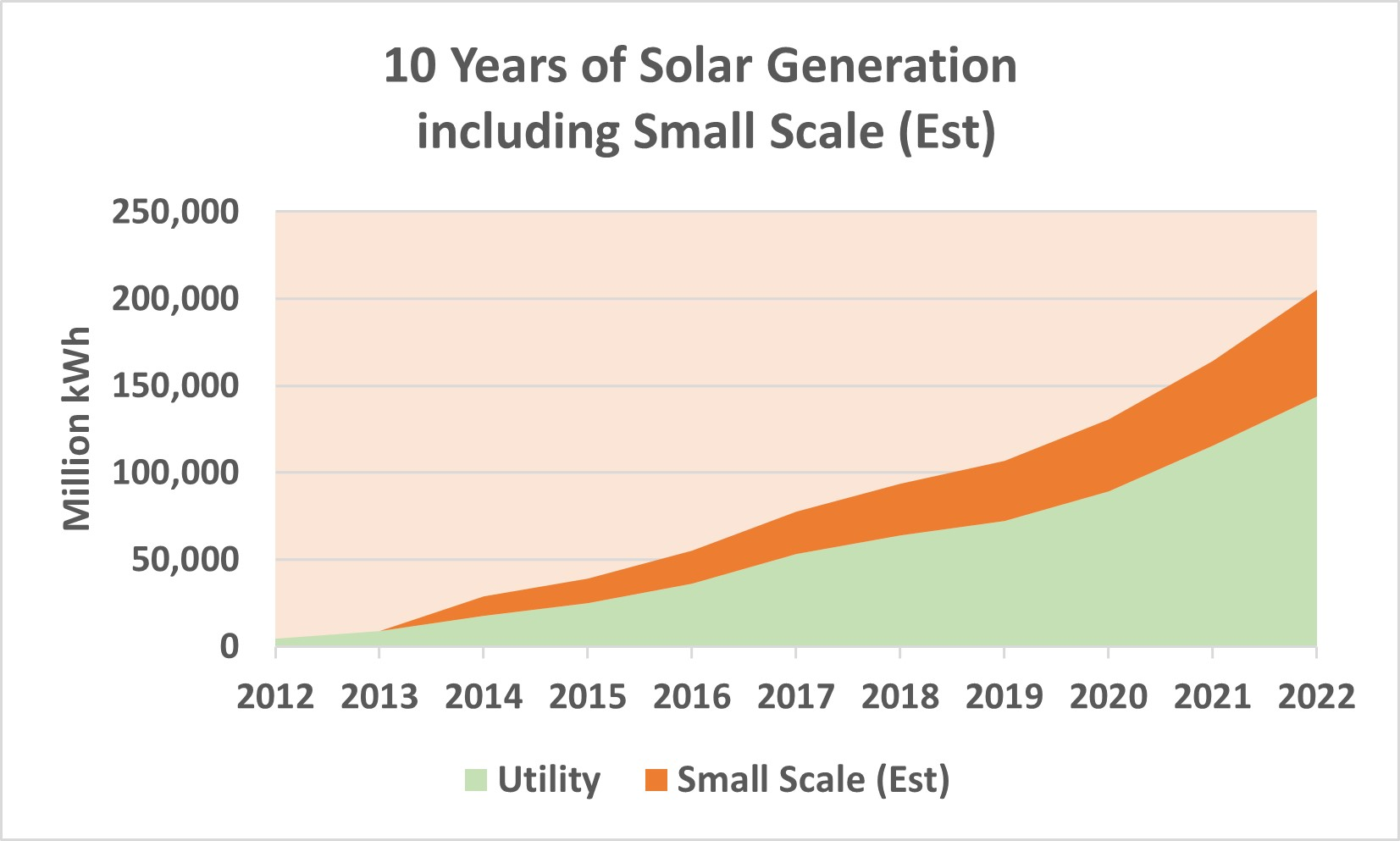
10 Years of Solar Generation including Small Scale

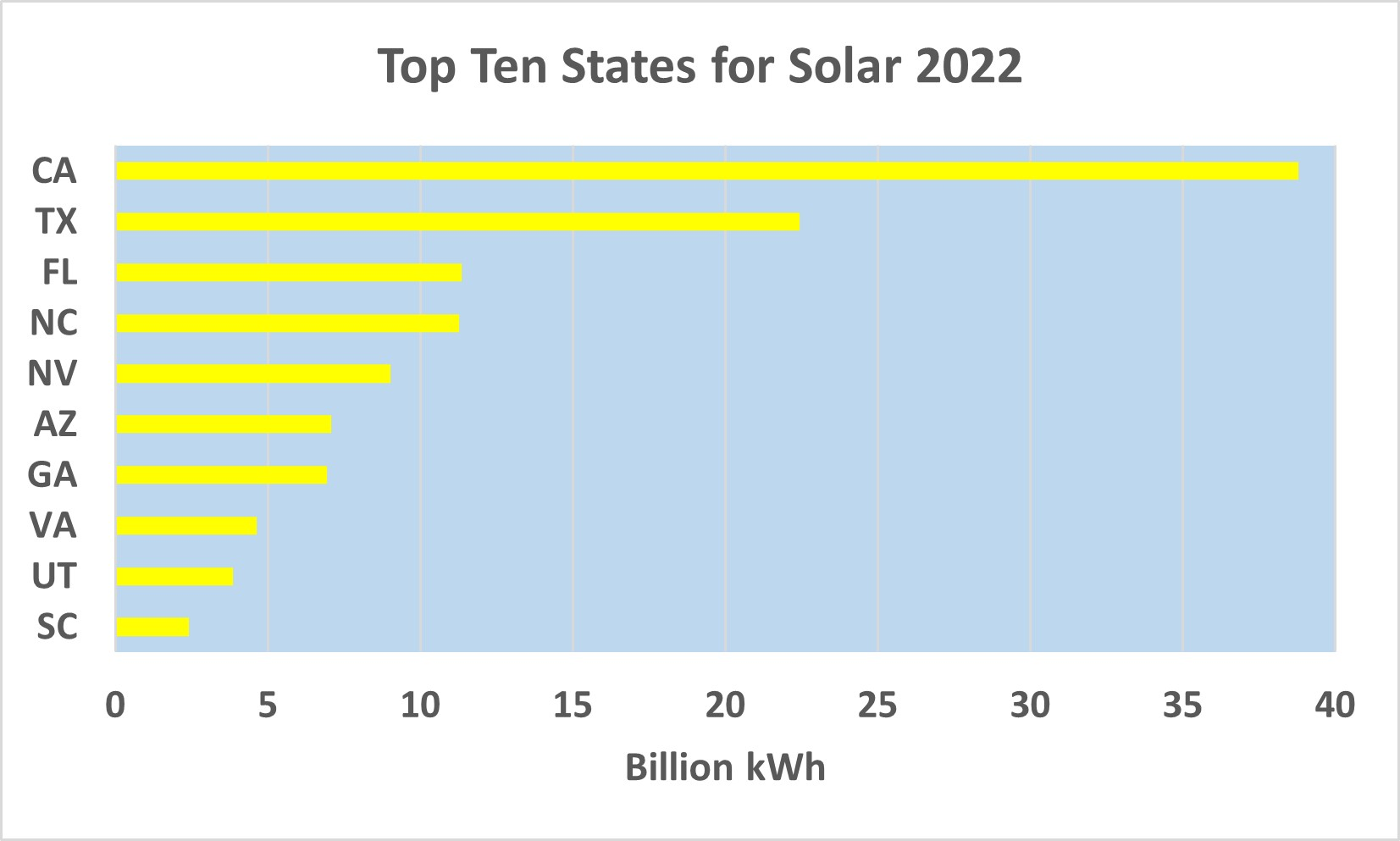
Top Ten States for Utility Solar 2022

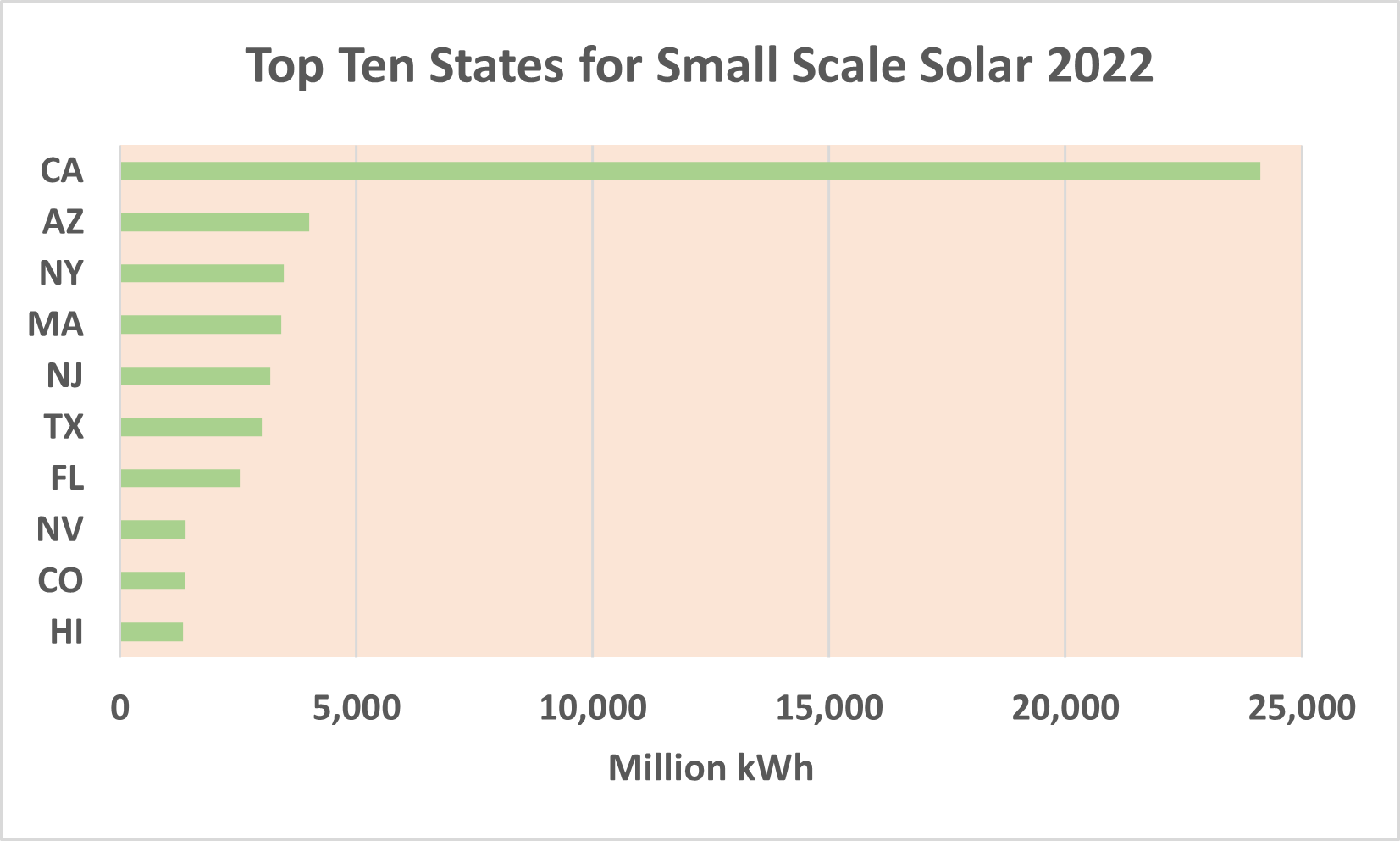
Top Ten States for Small Scale Solar

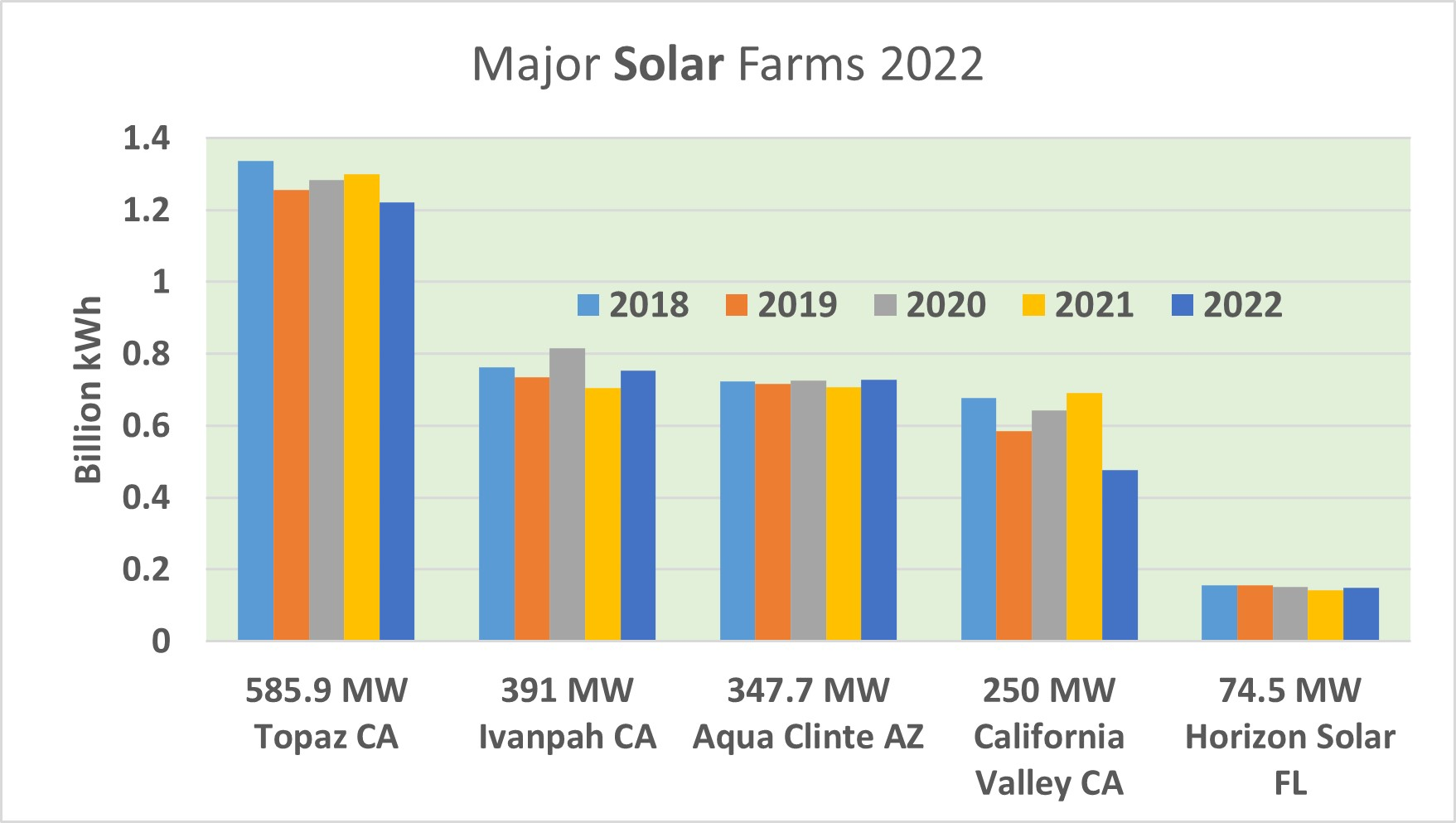
Major Solar Farms Generation 2022

==== Photovoltaics ====
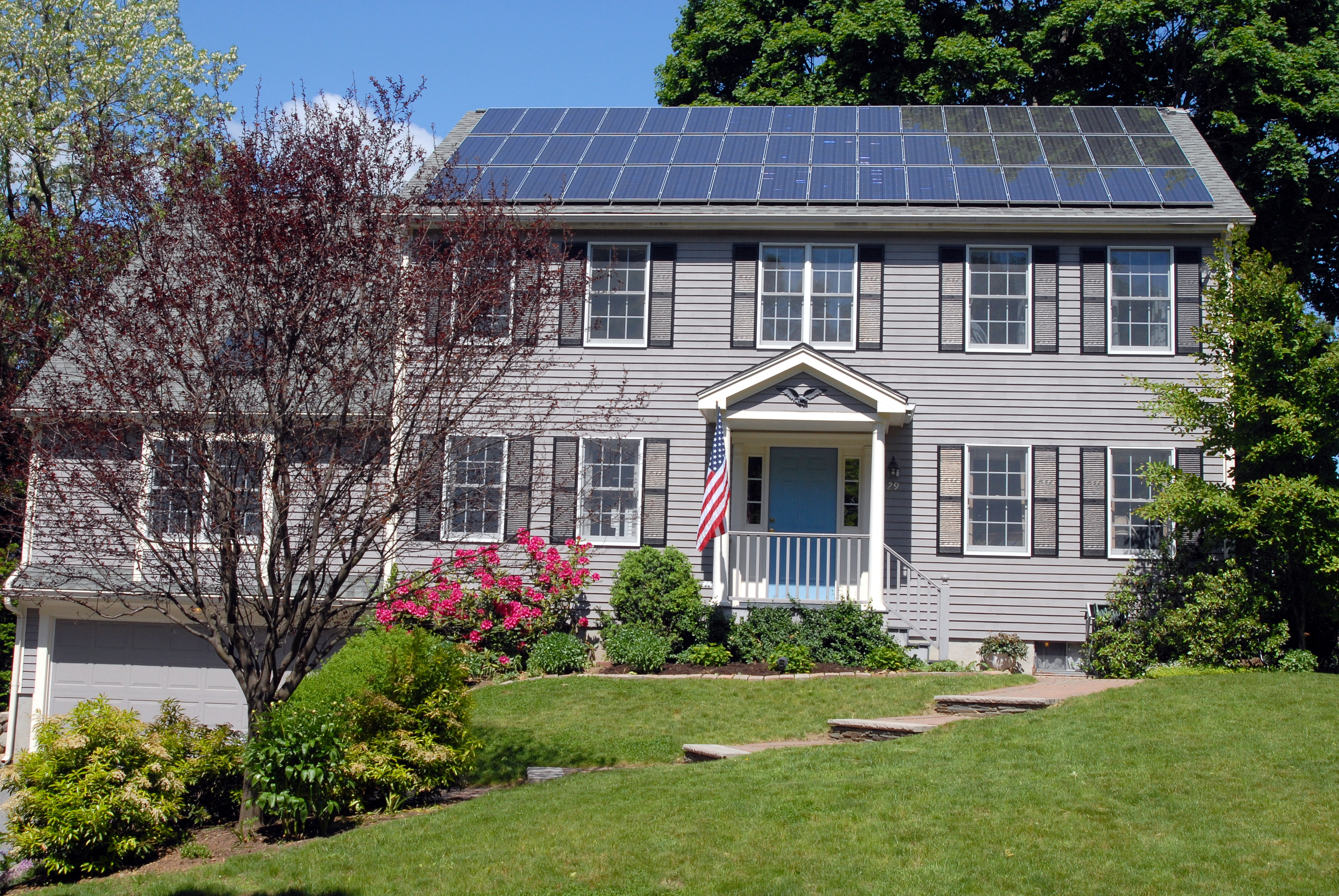
Photovoltaic solar panels on a house roof

At the end of 2022, the United States had 70.6 gigawatts (GW) of installed utility-scale photovoltaic capacity. The United States has some of the largest solar farms in the world. Mount Signal Solar had installed over 600 MW by 2018 and will have 800 MW of capacity upon completion. Solar Star is a 579 megawatt (MW_{AC}) farm near Rosamond, California. Completed in June 2015, it uses 1.7 million solar panels, spread over 13 square kilometres (5.0 sq mi). The Desert Sunlight Solar Farm is a 550 MW solar power plant in Riverside County, California, that uses thin-film solar photovoltaic modules made by First Solar. The Topaz Solar Farm is a 550 MW photovoltaic power plant, in San Luis Obispo County, California. The Blythe Solar Power Project is a 485 MW photovoltaic station planned for Riverside County, California.

Many schools and businesses have building-integrated photovoltaic solar panels on their roof. Most of these are grid connected and use net metering laws to allow use of electricity in the evening that was generated during the daytime. New Jersey leads the nation with the least restrictive net metering law, while California leads in total number of homes which have solar panels installed. Many were installed because of the million solar roof initiative.

California decided that it is not moving forward fast enough on photovoltaic generation and in 2008 enacted a feed-in tariff. Washington state has a feed-in tariff of 15 ¢/kWh which increases to 54 ¢/kWh if components are manufactured in the state. By 2015, California, Hawaii, Arizona and some other states were lowering payments to distributed solar owners and instituting new fees for grid usage. Tesla and a handful of other companies were promoting household grid-tied batteries while some electric companies were investing in utility-scale grid energy storage including very large batteries.

Beginning with the 2014 data year, Energy Information Administration has estimated distributed solar photovoltaic generation and distributed solar photovoltaic capacity. These non-utility scale estimates that the United States, generated the following additional electric energy from such distributed solar PV systems.

==== Concentrated solar power ====
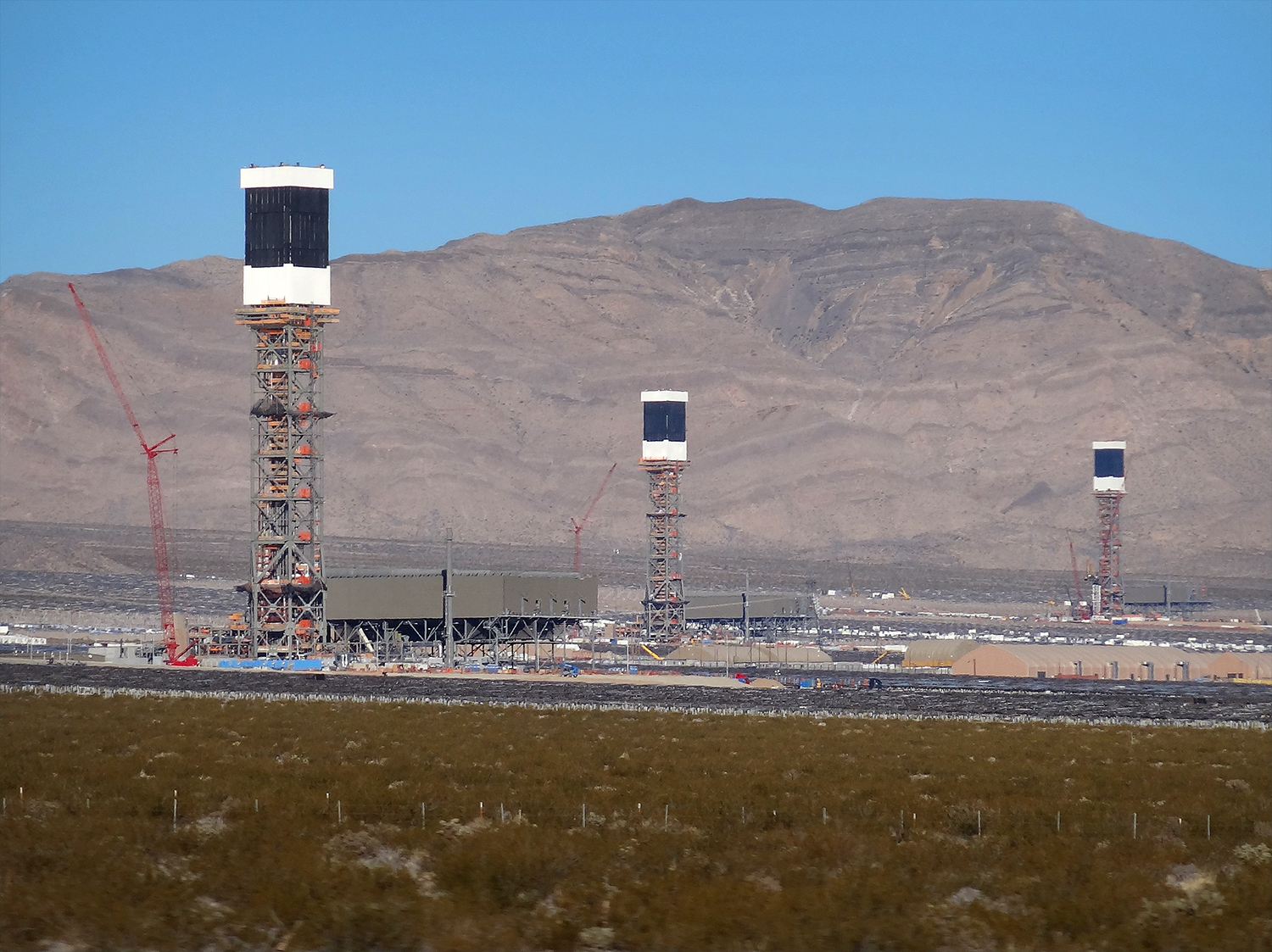
The 392 MW Ivanpah Solar Power Facility in California: The facility's three towers.

At the end of 2016 there were 1.76 GW total installed capacity of solar thermal power across the United States. Solar thermal power is generally utility-scale. Prior to 2012, in six southwestern states, Arizona, California, Colorado, Nevada, New Mexico, and Utah, the US Bureau of Land Management owned nearly 98 million acres (400,000 km^{2}), an area larger than the state of Montana, that was open to proposals for solar power installations. To streamline consideration of applications, the BLM produced a Programmatic Environmental Impact Statement (PEIS). In October 2012, the BLM withdrew 78% of its land from possible solar development, leaving 19 million acres (77,000 km^{2}) still open to applications for solar installations, an area nearly as large as South Carolina. Of the area left open to solar proposals, the BLM has identified 285 thousand acres in 17 highly favorable areas it calls Solar Energy Zones.

Solar thermal power plants designed for solar-only generation are well matched to summer noon peak loads in prosperous areas with significant cooling demands, such as the south-western United States. Using thermal energy storage systems, solar thermal operating periods can even be extended to meet base-load needs.

A 2013 study by the US National Renewable Energy Laboratory concluded that utility-scale solar power plants directly disturb an average of 2.7 to 2.9 acres per gigawatt-hour/year, and use from 3.5 to 3.8 acres per gW-hr/year for the entire sites. According to a 2009 study, this intensity of land use is less than that of the country's average power plant using surface-mined coal. Some of the land in the eastern portion of the Mojave Desert is to be preserved, but the solar industry is more interested in areas of the western desert, "where the sun burns hotter and there is easier access to transmission lines".

Some of the largest solar thermal power plants in the United States are in the south-west of the country, especially in the Mojave Desert. Solar Energy Generating Systems (SEGS) is the name given to nine solar power plants in the Mojave Desert commissioned between 1984 and 1991. The installation uses parabolic trough solar thermal technology along with natural gas to generate electricity. The facility has a total of 400,000 mirrors and covers 1,000 acres (4 km^{2}). The plants have a total generating capacity of 354 MW.

Nevada Solar One generates 64MW of power and in Boulder City, Nevada, and was built by the U.S. Department of Energy (DOE), National Renewable Energy Laboratory (NREL), and Solargenix Energy. Nevada Solar One started producing electricity in June 2007. Nevada Solar One uses parabolic troughs as thermal solar concentrators, heating tubes of liquid which act as solar receivers. These solar receivers are specially coated tubes made of glass and steel. About 19,300 of these 4 metre long tubes are used in the newly built power plant. Nevada Solar One also uses a technology that collects extra heat by putting it into phase-changing molten salts. This energy can then be drawn on at night.

The Ivanpah Solar Power Facility is a 392 megawatt (MW) solar power facility which is located in south-eastern California. The facility formally opened on February 13, 2014. The Solana Generating Station is a 280 MW solar power plant which is near Gila Bend, Arizona, about 70 miles (110 km) southwest of Phoenix. The 250MW Mojave Solar Project is located near Barstow, California. The Crescent Dunes Solar Energy Project is a 110 megawatt (MW) solar thermal power project near Tonopah, about 190 miles (310 km) northwest of Las Vegas.

=== Geothermal power ===
The United States is the world leader in online capacity and the generation of electricity from geothermal energy. According to 2022 state energy data, geothermal energy provided approximately 16 terawatt-hours (TWh) of electricity, or 0.37% of the total electricity consumed in the country. As of May 2007, geothermal electric power was generated in five states: Alaska, California, Hawaii, Nevada, and Utah. According to the Geothermal Energy Association's recent report, there were 75 new geothermal power projects underway in 12 states as of May 2007. This is an increase of 14 projects in an additional three states compared to a survey completed in November 2006.

The most significant catalyst behind new industry activity is the Energy Policy Act of 2005. This Act made new geothermal plants eligible for the full federal production tax credit, previously available only to wind power projects. It also authorized and directed increased funding for research by the Department of Energy, and gave the Bureau of Land Management new legal guidance and secure funding to address its backlog of geothermal leases and permits.

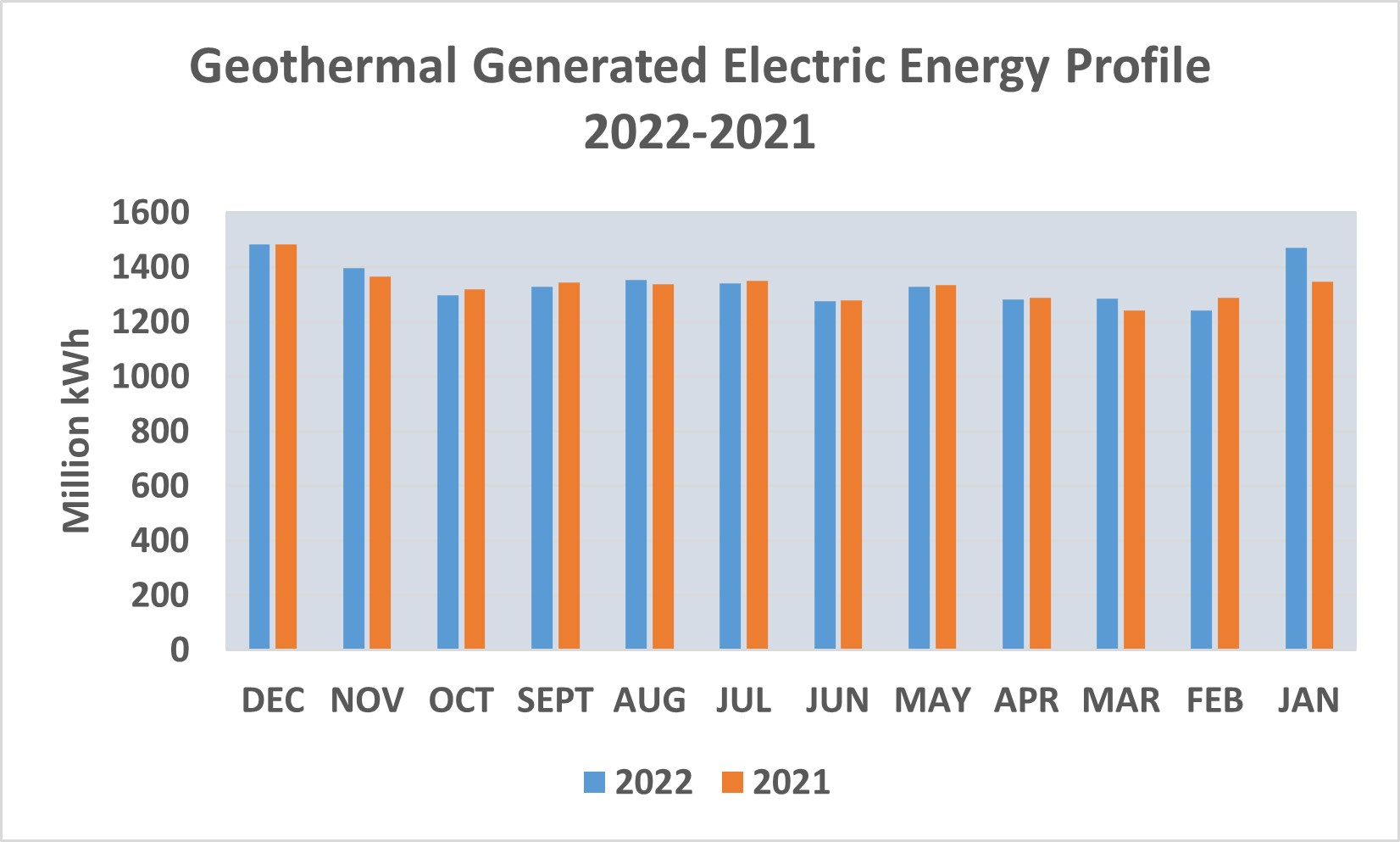
Geothermal Generated Electric Energy Profile 2022-2021

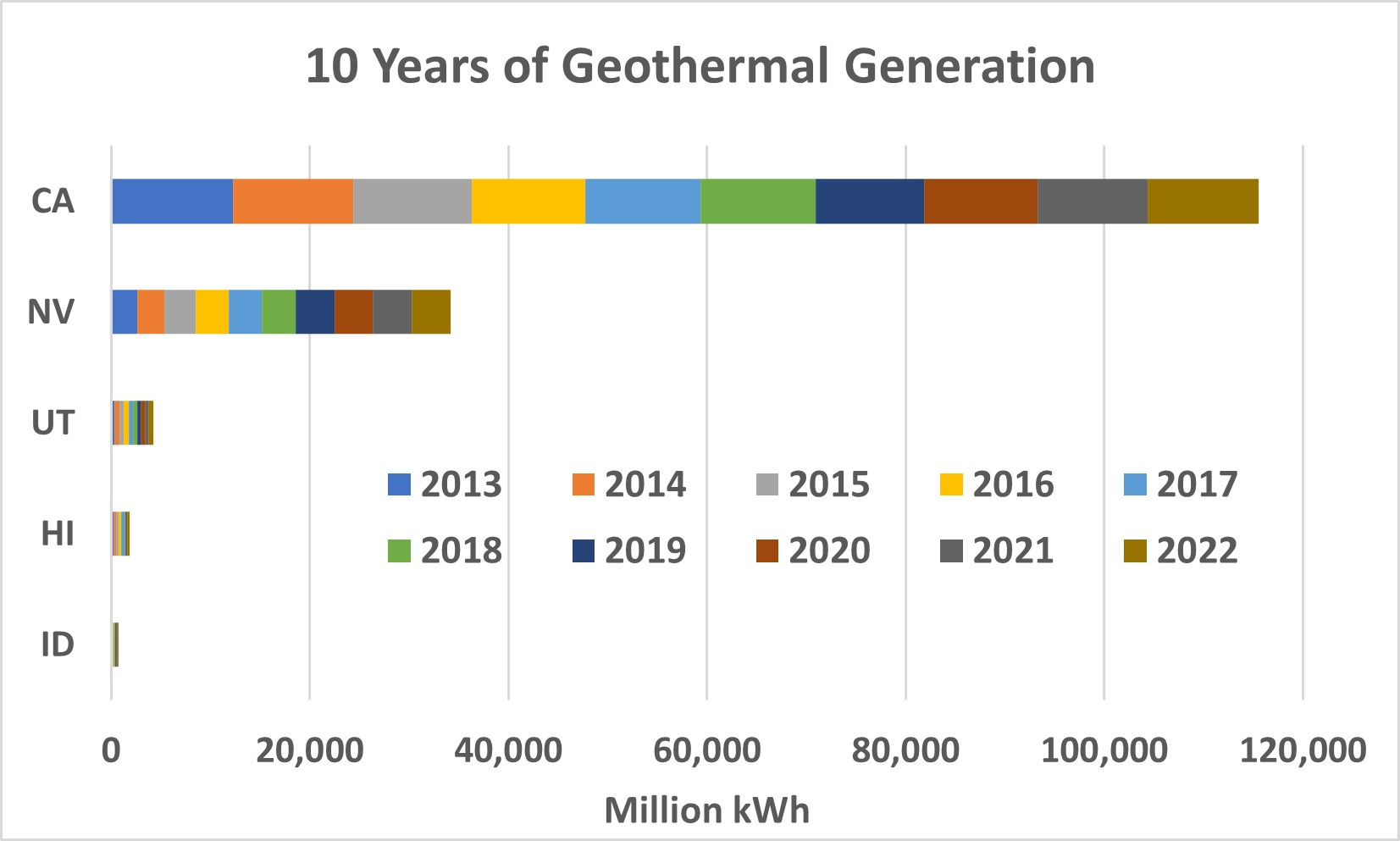
10 Years of Geothermal Generation, 2013-2022

Geothermal capacity and generation by state as of December 2017
State	Capacity (MW)	% of Capacity	Electric generation (MWh)	Capacity factor
California	1838	74%	11,559,591	0.718
Nevada	498.2	20%	3,291,874	0.754
Utah	73	3%	480,928	0.752
Hawaii	43	1.7%	322,592	0.856
Oregon	19.5	0.8%	174,381	1.0
Idaho	10	0.4%	84,436	0.964
New Mexico	1.6	0.06%	12,963	0.925
Total	2483.3	100%	15,926,765	0.732

=== Biomass ===
In 2022, biomass generated 51.847 terawatt-hours (TWh) of electricity, or 1.21% of the country's total electricity production. Biomass was the largest source of renewable primary energy in the US, and the fourth-largest renewable source of electrical power in the US, after wind, hydropower, and solar.

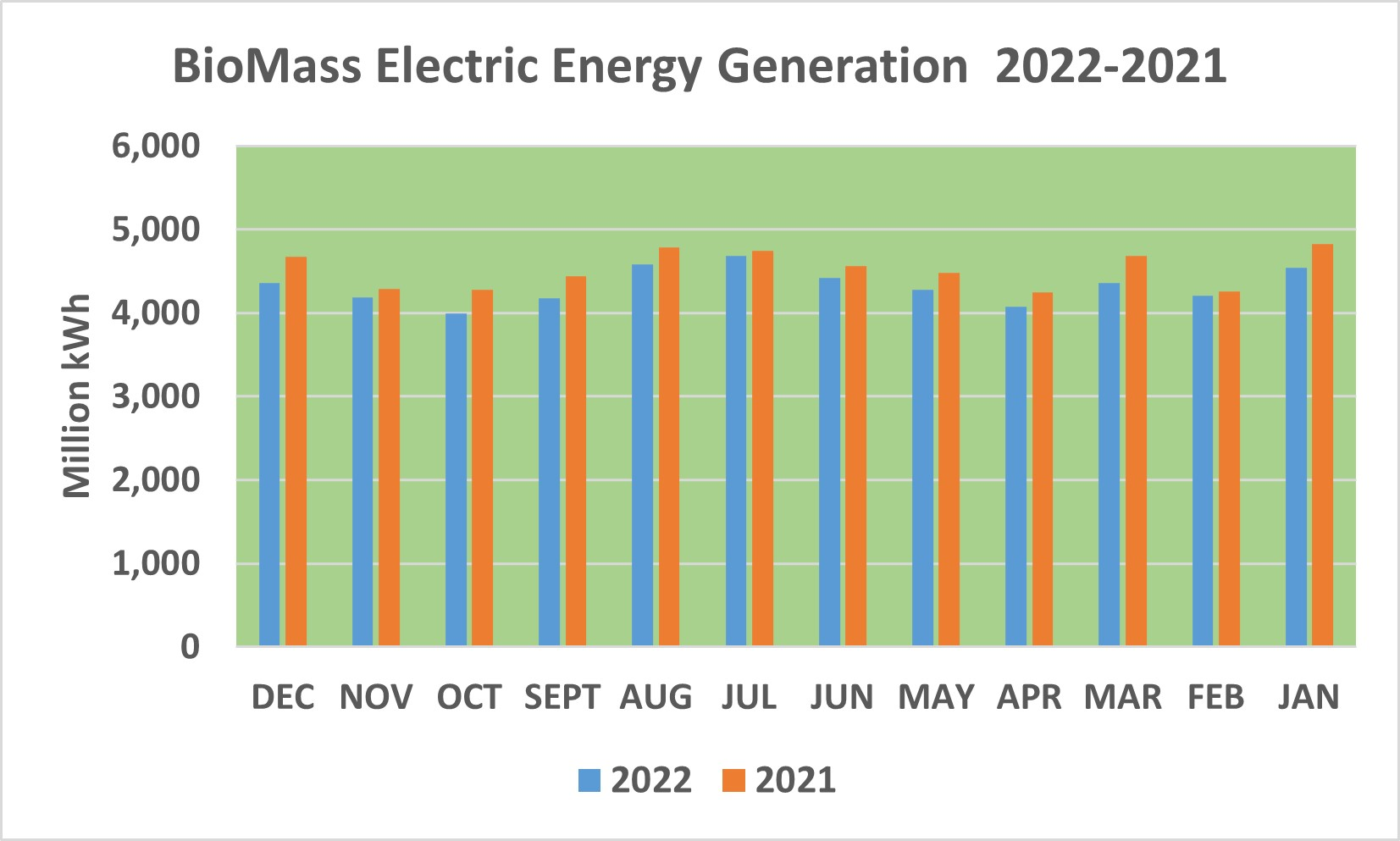
BioMass Electric Energy Generation 2022-2021

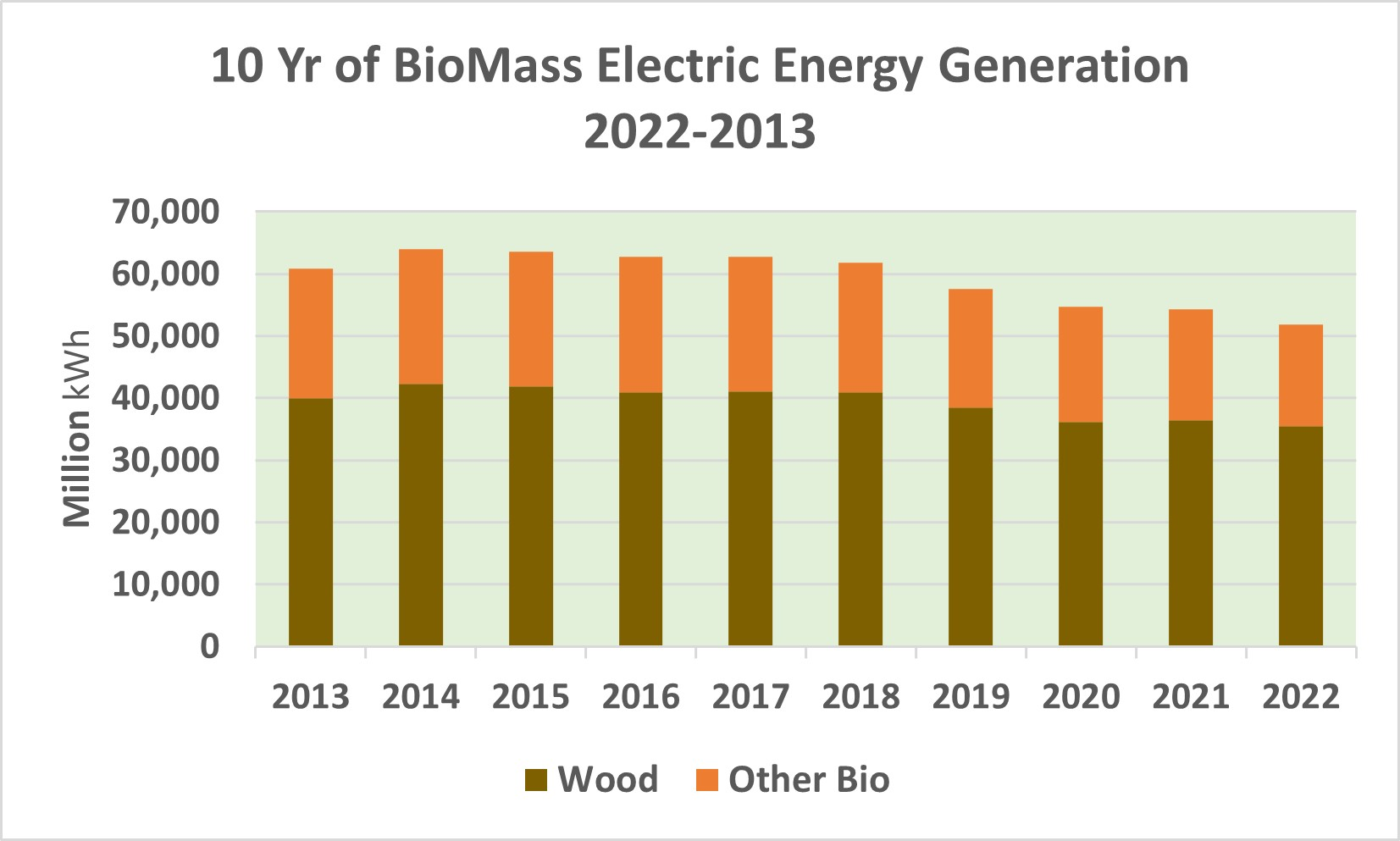
10 Years of Biomass Electric Energy Generation 2022-2013

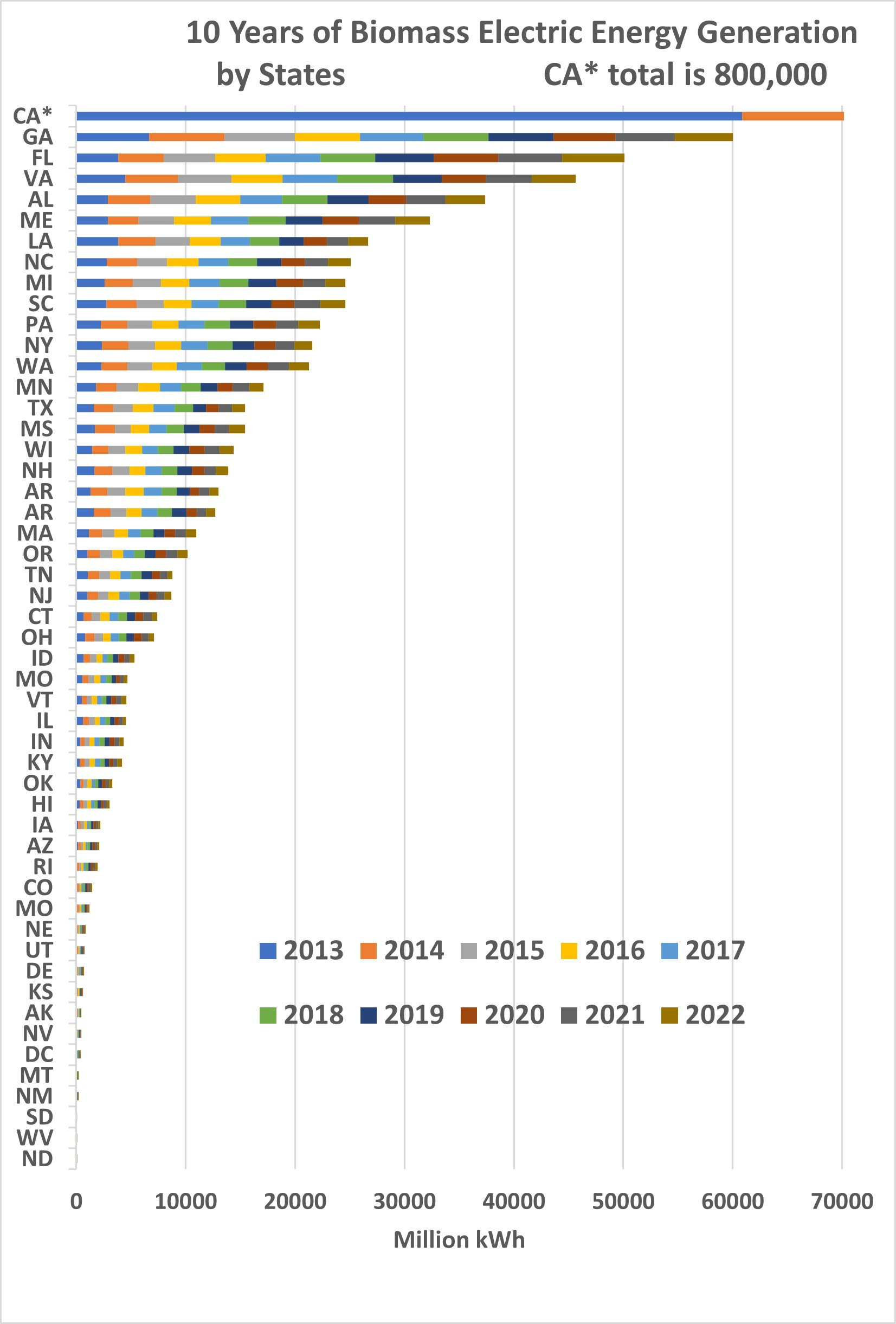
10 Years of Biomass Electric Energy Generation

Biomass electric generation data combines two basic categories:

1. Wood and wood-derived fuels including wood/wood waste solids (including paper pellets, railroad ties, utility poles, wood chips, bark and wood waste solids), wood waste liquids (red liquor, sludge wood, spent sulfite liquor, and other wood-based liquids), and black liquor;
2. Other biomass fuels include municipal solid waste, landfill gas, sludge waste agricultural byproducts, other biomass solids, other biomass liquids, and other biomass gases (including digester gases, methane, and other biomass gases)

=== Wave power ===
Wave power in the United States is under development in several locations off the east and west coasts as well as Hawaii. It has moved beyond the research phase and is producing reliable energy. Its use to-date has been for situations where other forms of energy production are not economically viable and as such, the power output is currently modest. But major installations are planned to come on-line within the next few years.

== Solar water heating ==
In 2006, the U.S. Department of Energy stated that more than 1.5 million homes and businesses were using solar water heating in the United States, representing a capacity of over 1,000 megawatts (MW) of thermal energy generation. It predicted that another 400 MW was likely to be installed over the next 3–5 years.

Assuming that 40 percent of existing homes in the United States have adequate access to sunlight, 29 million solar water heaters could be installed.

Solar water heaters can operate in any climate. Performance varies depending on how much solar energy is available at the site, as well as how cold the water coming into the system is. The colder the water, the more efficiently the system operates.

Solar water heaters reduce the need for conventional water heating by about two-thirds and pay for their installation within 4 to 8 years with electricity or natural gas savings. Compared to those with electric water heaters, Florida homeowners with solar water heaters save 50 to 85 percent on their water heating bills, according to the Florida Solar Energy Center.

== Biofuels ==
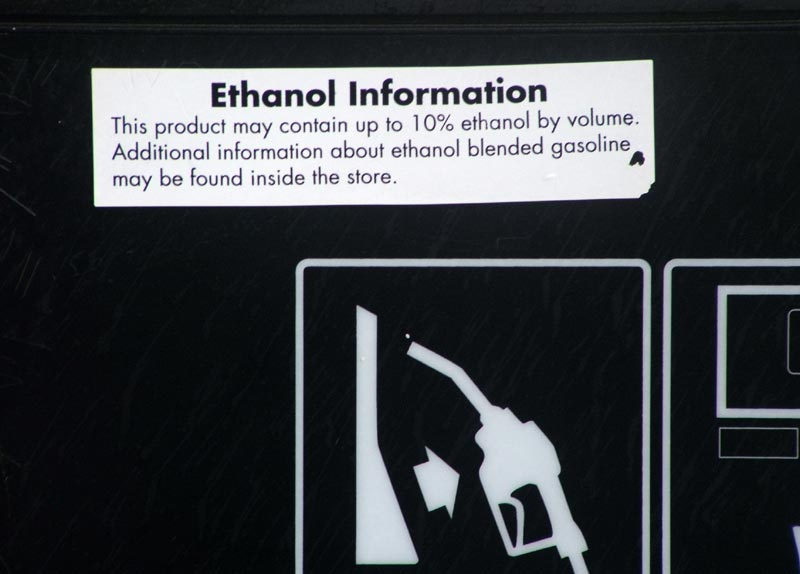
Information on pump, California

Many cars sold in the U.S. since 2001 are able to run on blends of up to 15% ethanol. Older cars in the United States can run on blends of up to 10% ethanol. Motor vehicle manufacturers already produce vehicles designed to run on much higher ethanol blends. Ford, DaimlerChrysler, and GM are among the automobile companies that sell "flexible-fuel" cars, trucks, and minivans that can use gasoline and ethanol blends ranging from pure gasoline up to 85% ethanol (E85). By mid-2006, there were approximately 6 million E85-compatible vehicles on the road.

Ninety-five percent of gasoline sold in the U.S.(2016) is blended with 10% ethanol. There are challenges in moving to higher blends, however. Flex-fuel vehicles are assisting in this transition because they allow drivers to choose different fuels based on price and availability. The Energy Independence and Security Act of 2007, which calls for 15.2 billion US gallons (58,000,000 m^{3}) of biofuels to be used annually by 2012, will also help to expand the market. The USDA in 2015 began offering grants to help gasoline retailers install blender pumps for dispensing mid-level ethanol blends.

The expanding ethanol and biodiesel industries are providing jobs in plant construction, operations, and maintenance, mostly in rural communities. According to the Renewable Fuels Association, the ethanol industry created almost 154,000 jobs in 2005 alone, boosting household income by $5.7 billion. It also contributed about $3.5 billion in tax revenues at the local, state, and federal levels. On the other hand, in 2010, the biofuel industry received $6.64 billion in federal government support.

== Renewable energy research ==
There are numerous organizations within the academic, federal, and commercial sectors conducting large-scale advanced research in the field of renewable energy. This research spans several areas of focus across the renewable energy spectrum. Most of the research is targeted at improving efficiency and increasing overall energy yields. Multiple federally supported research organizations have focused on renewable energy in recent years. Two of the most prominent of these labs are Sandia National Laboratories (SNL) and the National Renewable Energy Laboratory (NREL), both of which are funded by the United States Department of Energy and supported by various corporate partners. As of 2009, Sandia had a total budget of $2.4 billion while NREL had a budget of $375 million.

Both the SNL and the NREL have heavily funded solar research programs. BP was also heavily invested in solar research programs until 2008 when the company began scaling back its solar operations. The company finally shut down its forty-year-old solar business after executives decided solar power production is not economically competitive. The NREL solar program had a budget of around $75 million as of 2009 and develops research projects in the areas of photovoltaic (PV) technology, solar thermal energy, and solar radiation. The budget for Sandia's solar division is unknown, however it accounts for a significant percentage of the laboratory's $2.4 billion budget.

Several academic programs have focused on solar research in recent years. The Solar Energy Research Center (SERC) at University of North Carolina (UNC) has the sole purpose of developing cost effective solar technology. In 2008, researchers at Massachusetts Institute of Technology (MIT) developed a method to store solar energy by using it to produce hydrogen fuel from water. Such research is targeted at addressing the obstacle that solar development faces of storing energy for use during nighttime hours when the sun is not shining. In February 2012, North Carolina–based Semprius Inc., a solar development company backed by German corporation Siemens, announced that they had developed the world's most efficient solar panel. The company claims that the prototype converts 33.9% of the sunlight that hits it to electricity, more than double the previous high-end conversion rate.

Wind energy research dates back several decades to the 1970s when NASA developed an analytical model to predict wind turbine power generation during high winds. Today, both the SNL and NREL have programs dedicated to wind research. Sandia's laboratory focuses on the advancement of materials, aerodynamics, and sensors. The NREL wind projects are centered on improving wind plant power production, reducing their capital costs, and making wind energy more cost effective overall. The Field Laboratory for Optimized Wind Energy (FLOWE) at Caltech was established to research renewable approaches to wind energy farming technology practices that have the potential to reduce the cost, size, and environmental impact of wind energy production.

As the primary source of biofuels in North America, many organizations are conducting research in the area of ethanol production. On the Federal level, the USDA conducts a large amount of research regarding ethanol production in the United States. Much of this research is targeted toward the effect of ethanol production on domestic food markets. The National Renewable Energy Laboratory has conducted various ethanol research projects, mainly in the area of cellulosic ethanol. Cellulosic ethanol has many benefits over traditional corn-based ethanol. It does not take away or directly conflict with the food supply because it is produced from wood, grasses, or non-edible parts of plants. Some studies have shown cellulosic ethanol to be more cost effective and economically sustainable than corn-based ethanol. Sandia National Laboratories conducts in-house cellulosic ethanol research and is also a member of the Joint BioEnergy Institute (JBEI), a research institute founded by the United States Department of Energy with the goal of developing cellulosic biofuels.

Over $1 billion of federal money has been spent on the research and development of hydrogen fuel in the United States. Both the NREL and SNL have departments dedicated to hydrogen research.

=== White hydrogen ===
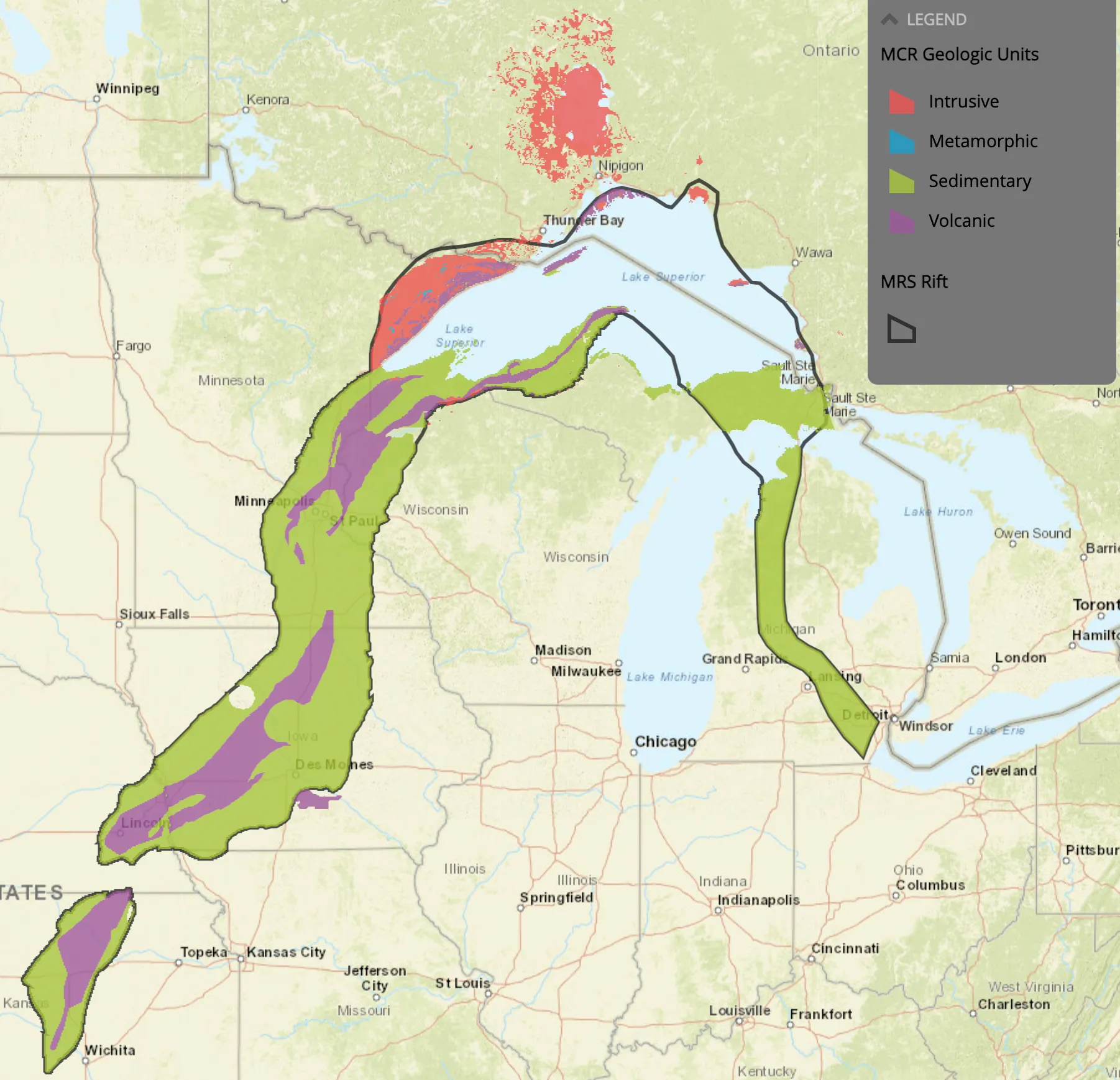
The Mid-continental Rift System

White hydrogen could be found or produced in the Mid-continental Rift System at scale for a renewable hydrogen economy. Water could be pumped down to hot iron-rich rock to produce hydrogen and the hydrogen could be extracted.

== Employment ==
Accurate estimates regarding job creation as a result of an increasing reliance on renewable energy in the United States are challenging to predict due to unforeseen technological developments, uncertainty surrounding the United States' future import/export levels of renewable energy technology, and ambiguity regarding indirect and induced employment effects. That being said, it is very likely that the United States would see a net increase in employment in the energy sector as a result of a renewable energy transition.

A study performed by Wei, Patadia, and Kammen about renewable energy efficiency in the United States found that the renewable energy sector generates significantly more jobs than the fossil fuel sector based on the per energy unit delivered. The renewable energies found to have the highest employment per energy unit generated ratios are solar and wind; this is likely due to their installation components. Although net employment would vary per location within the U.S., for example, West Virginia's net employment would be more adversely impacted than California's due to West Virginia's coal mining industry, in total, net employment in the energy sector within the U.S. is projected to considerably increase. The increase in direct employment as well as increased renewable energy infrastructure would naturally lead to additional indirect and induced jobs as well.

Research done on countries in the European Union has affirmed this positive net employment notion. Towards a green energy economy? Tracking the employment effects of low-carbon technologies in the European Union, a study done by Markandya et al. used a multi-regional input-output model in conjunction with the World Input-Output Database to analyze data from 1995 - 2009 in search of net employment impacts. These years were specifically considered as the European Union's energy structure was shifting significantly towards gas and other renewable forms of energy during this time. Although the country specific affects varied, it was found that 530,000 jobs overall were netted from the transition during this timeframe.

Another study done on Germany by Lehr, Lutz, and Edler used the PANTA RHEI model to evaluate the German energy situation by taking positive and negative renewable energy impacts into account. The model considered different assumptions for fossil fuel prices, domestic installations, international trade, and German exports to developing renewable energy world markets. Under almost all of the scenarios, positive net employment effects were exhibited.

== Public opinion ==
Acceptance of wind and solar facilities in one's community is stronger among Democrats (blue), while acceptance of nuclear power plants is stronger among Republicans (red).

According to a 2019 CBS News poll on 2,143 U.S. residents, 42% of American adults under 45 years old thought that the U.S. could realistically transition to 100% renewable energy by 2050 while 29% deemed it unrealistic and 29% were unsure. Those numbers for older Americans are 34%, 40%, and 25%, respectively. Differences in opinion might be due to education as younger Americans are more likely to have been taught about climate change in schools than their elders.

== Policy ==
The Energy Policy Act of 2005 requires all public electric utilities to facilitate net metering. This allows homes and businesses performing distributed generation to pay only the net cost of electricity from the grid: electricity used minus electricity produced locally and sent back into the grid. For intermittent renewable energy sources this effectively uses the grid as a battery to smooth over lulls and fill in production gaps.

Some jurisdictions go one step further and have instituted feed-in tariff, which allows any power customer to actually make money by producing more renewable energy than is consumed locally.

From 2006 to 2014, US households received more than $18 billion in federal income tax credits for weatherizing their homes, installing solar panels, buying hybrid and electric vehicles, and other "clean energy" investments. These tax expenditures went predominantly to higher-income Americans. The bottom three income quintiles received about 10% of all credits, while the top quintile received about 60%. The most extreme is the program aimed at electric vehicles, where the top income quintile received about 90% of all credits. Market mechanisms have less skewed distributional effects.

The American Recovery and Reinvestment Act of 2009 included more than $70 billion in direct spending and tax credits for clean energy and associated transportation programs. This policy-stimulus combination represents the largest federal commitment in United States history for renewable energy, advanced transportation, and energy conservation initiatives. These new initiatives were expected to encourage many more utilities to strengthen their clean energy programs. While the Department of Energy has come under criticism for providing loan guarantees to Solyndra, its SunShot initiative has funded successful companies such as EnergySage and Zep Solar.

In his January 24, 2012, State of the Union address, President Barack Obama restated his commitment to renewable energy, stating that he "will not walk away from the promise of clean energy." Obama called for a commitment by the Defense Department to purchase 1,000 MW of renewable energy. He also mentioned the long-standing Interior Department commitment to permit 10,000 MW of renewable energy projects on public land in 2012.

Some Environmental Protection Agency facilities in the United States use renewable energy for all or part of their supply at the following facilities.

Energy technologies receive government subsidies. In 2016, federal government energy-specific subsidies and supports for renewables, fossil fuels, and nuclear energy were $6,682 million, $489 million and $365 million, respectively. All but a few U.S. states now have incentives in place to promote renewable energy, while more than a dozen have enacted new renewable energy laws in recent years. Renewable energy suffered a political setback in the United States in September 2011 with the bankruptcy of Solyndra, a company that had received a $535 million federal loan guarantee.

In May 2024, the Biden administration doubled tariffs on solar cells imported from China and more than tripled tariffs on lithium-ion electric vehicle batteries imported from China. The tariff increases will be phased in over a period of three years.

=== Net metering ===
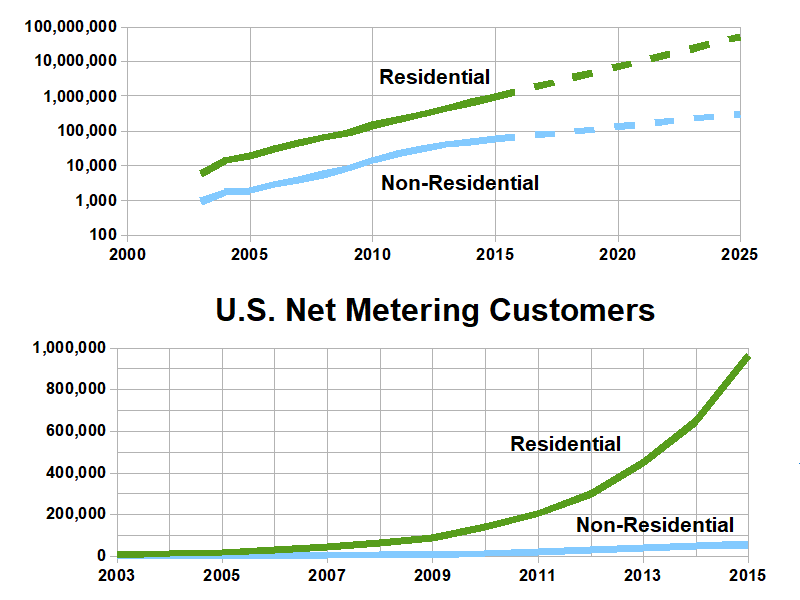
Growth of net metering in the United States

Net metering is a policy by many states in the United States designed to help the adoption of renewable energy. Net metering was pioneered in the United States as a way to allow solar and wind to provide electricity whenever available and allow use of that electricity whenever it was needed, beginning with utilities in Idaho in 1980, and in Arizona in 1981. In 1983, Minnesota passed the first state net metering law. As of March 2015, 44 states and Washington, D.C. have developed mandatory net metering rules for at least some utilities. However, although the states' rules are clear, few utilities actually compensate at full retail rates.

Net metering policies are determined by states, which have set policies varying on a number of key dimensions. The Energy Policy Act of 2005 required state electricity regulators to "consider" (but not necessarily implement) rules that mandate public electric utilities make net metering available to their customers upon request. Several legislative bills have been proposed to institute a federal standard limit on net metering. They range from H.R. 729, which sets a net metering cap at 2% of forecasted aggregate customer peak demand, to H.R. 1945, which has no aggregate cap, but does limit residential users to 10 kW, a low limit compared to many states, such as New Mexico, with an 80,000 kW limit, or states such as Arizona, Colorado, New Jersey, and Ohio, which limit as a percentage of load.

=== Initiatives ===
==== SunShot ====
In February 2011, the U.S. Department of Energy (DOE) launched its SunShot Initiative, a collaborative national effort to cut the total cost of photovoltaic solar energy systems by 75% by 2020. Reaching this goal would make unsubsidized solar energy cost-competitive with other forms of electricity and get grid parity . The SunShot initiative included a crowdsourced innovation program run in partnership with Topcoder, during which 17 different solar energy application solutions were developed in 60 days. In 2011, the price was $4/W, and the SunShot goal of $1/W by 2020 was reached in 2017.

==== Wind Powering America ====
Wind Powering America (WPA) is another DOE initiative that seeks to increase the use of wind energy. WPA collaborates with state and regional stakeholders, including farmers, ranchers, Native Americans, rural electric cooperatives, consumer-owned utilities and schools.

WPA has focused on states with strong potential for wind energy generation but with few operational projects. WPA provides information about the challenges, benefits, and impacts of wind technology implementation.

==== Solar America Initiative ====
The Solar America Initiative (SAI) is a part of the Federal Advanced Energy Initiative to accelerate the development of advanced photovoltaic materials with the goal of making it cost-competitive with other forms of renewable electricity by 2015.

The DOE Solar Energy Technology Program (SETP) intended to achieve the goals of the SAI through partnerships and strategic alliances by focusing primarily on four areas:

- Market Transformation — activities that address marketplace barriers
- Device and Process Proof of Concept — R&D activities that address novel devices or processes with significant performance or cost advantages
- Component Prototype and Pilot-Scale Production — R&D activities emphasizing development of prototype photovoltaic (PV) components or systems at pilot-scale with demonstrated cost, reliability or performance advantages
- System Development and Manufacturing — collaborative R&D activities among industry and university partners

==== California Solar Initiative ====
As part of former Governor Arnold Schwarzenegger's Million Solar Roofs Program, California set a goal to create 3,000 megawatts of new, solar-produced electricity by 2017, with funding of $2.8 billion.

The California Solar Initiative offers cash incentives on solar PV systems of up to $2.50 a watt. These incentives, combined with federal tax incentives, can cover up to 50% of the total cost of a solar panel system. Financial incentives to support renewable energy are available in some other US states.

==== Green Power Partnership ====
The EPA named the top 20 partners in its Green Power Partnership that are generating their own renewable energy on-site. Combined, they generate more than 736 million kilowatt-hours of renewable energy on-site each year, enough to power more than 61,000 average U.S. homes.

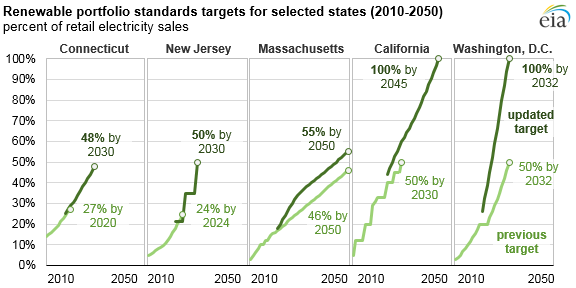
Selected state renewable portfolio standards with 2018 revisions. 29 states have adopted policies targeting a percentage of their energy to come from renewable sources.

==== Renewable portfolio standards ====
A Renewable Portfolio Standard refers to legislation that creates a market in tradeable renewable or green electricity certificates. Electricity distributors or wholesaler purchasers of electricity are required to source a specified percentage of their electricity (portfolio) from renewable generation sources. Liable entities that fall short of their quota can purchase certificates from accredited suppliers who have generated renewable electricity and obtained and registered certificates to sell on that market.

=== Bans and moratoriums ===
By February 2024, at least 15% of counties in the United States had imposed bans or other restrictions to prevent construction of wind and solar projects.

== Renewable energy organizations ==
The American Council on Renewable Energy (ACORE), is a non-profit organization with headquarters in Washington, D.C. It was founded in 2001 as a unifying forum for bringing renewable energy into the mainstream of America's economy and lifestyle. In 2010 ACORE had over 700 member organizations. In 2007, ACORE published Outlook On Renewable Energy In America, a two volume report about the future of renewable energy in the United States. It has been said that this report exposes a "new reality for renewable energy in America."

The Environmental and Energy Study Institute (EESI) is a non-profit organization which promotes environmentally sustainable societies. Founded in 1984 by a group of Congressional Members, EESI seeks to be a catalyst that moves society away from environmentally damaging fossil fuels and toward a clean energy future. EESI presents policy solutions that will result in decreased global warming and air pollution; improvements in public health, energy security and rural economic development opportunities; increased use of renewable energy sources and improved energy efficiency.

An important part of the mission of the National Renewable Energy Laboratory (NREL) is the transfer of NREL-developed technologies to renewable energy markets. NREL's Technology Transfer Office supports laboratory scientists and engineers in the successful and practical application of their expertise and the technologies they develop. R&D staff and facilities are recognized and valued by industry, as demonstrated through many collaborative research projects and licensed technologies with public and private partners. NREL's innovative technologies have also been recognized with 39 R&D 100 Awards.

The Rocky Mountain Institute (RMI) is an organization dedicated to research, publication, consulting, and lecturing in the general field of sustainability, with a special focus on profitable innovations for energy and resource efficiency. RMI is headquartered in Snowmass, Colorado, and also maintains offices in Boulder, Colorado. RMI is the publisher of the book Winning the Oil Endgame.

== Community renewable energy ==
Community renewable energy efforts incorporate calls for energy democracy to place the responsibility of the planning and implementation processes of a renewable energy project within a community. Community based renewable energy projects are expected to have a wide range of positive social impacts on top of decreasing fossil fuel usage, such as "acceptance of renewable energy developments; awareness of renewable and sustainable energy technologies and issues; uptake of low carbon technologies; and sustainable/pro-environmental behavior". However, in a survey conducted within a community about community renewable energy projects, results showed that while there was widespread support for implementation, there were low levels of desire for personal involvement, meaning many people shied away from potentially serving as project leaders. Often times, the degree of ownership is debated within the planning process.

Community renewable energy projects prioritize the participation of the end-user communities, challenging the traditional power structures of renewable energy projects. Community renewable energy projects, and the slew of positive social impacts often associated with them, are only successful with institutional support. Scholarships highlights the prevalence of institutional support in the EU and the UK for community based renewable energy, and not surprisingly, there are many more successful projects in Europe than there are in the United States.

Existing literature shows a clear lack of institutional support for community-based renewable energy projects within the United States. However, market-based investments in fields such as community-based solar and wind projects are evident in the US. The private sector has especially increased interest in community solar energy projects within the past couple of years. The differing approaches to community-based renewable energy projects globally may be attributed to the differences within the liberal welfare states of Europe compared to the United States.

== Potential resources ==
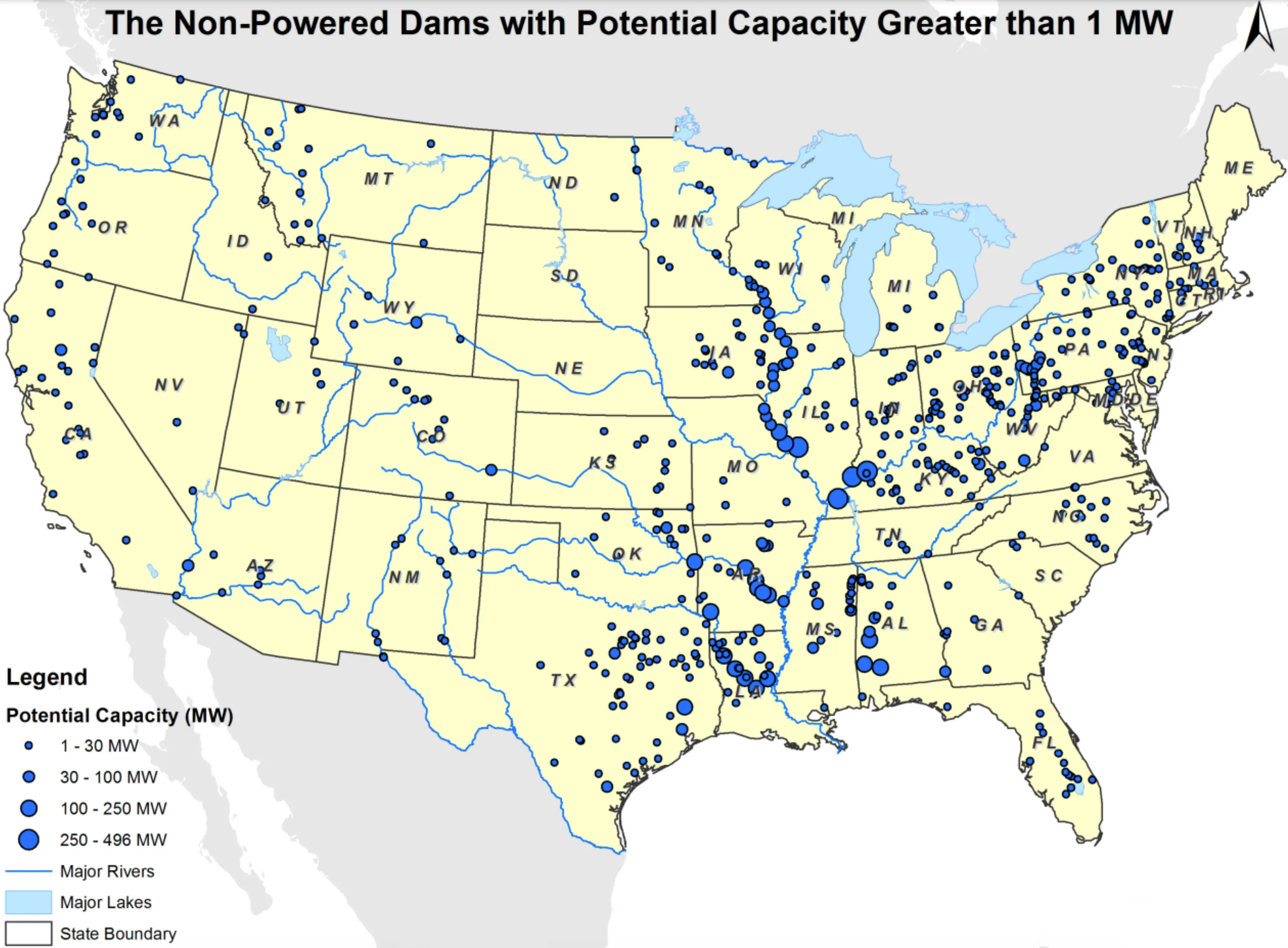
Non-powered dams hydroelectric potential

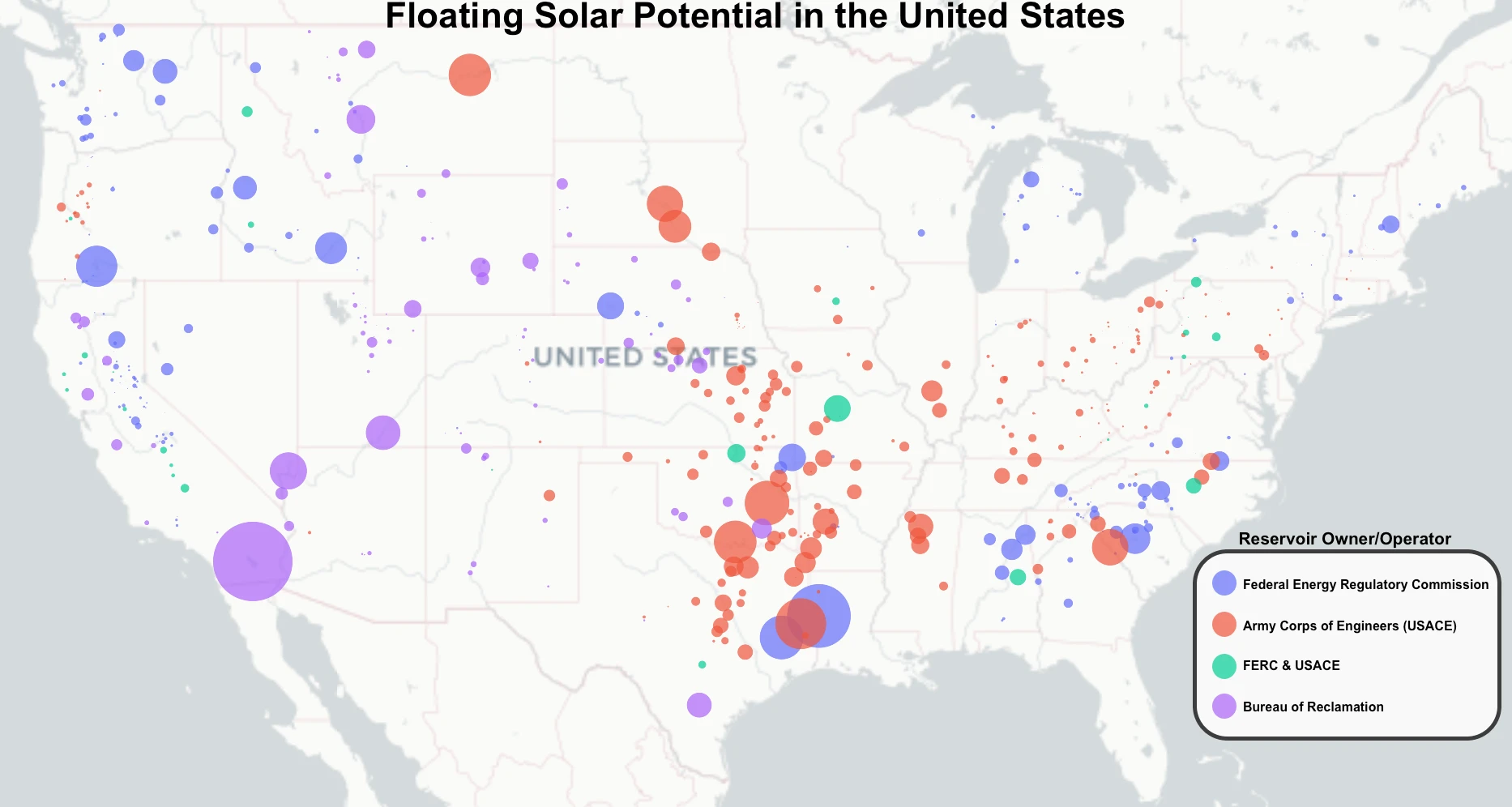
Floating solar on lakes Reservoir owner/operator & power potential Federal Energy Regulatory Commission Army Corps of Engineers (USACE) FERC & USACE United States Bureau of Reclamation

The United States has the potential of installing 11 terawatt (TW) of onshore wind power and 4 TW of offshore wind power, capable of generating over 47,000 TWh. The potential for concentrated solar power in the southwest is estimated at 10 to 20 TW, capable of generating over 10,000 TWh.

A 2012 report by the National Renewable Energy Laboratory evaluates the potential energy resources for each state of the United States.

Total technical potential
Type	Resource	Potential capacity (GW)	Potential generation (TWh)
Solar	Urban utility-scale PV	1,200	2,200
Solar	Rural utility-scale PV	153,000	280,600
Solar	Rooftop PV	664	800
Solar	Concentrating solar power	38,000	116,100
Solar	Total	192,922	399,810
Wind	Onshore wind power	11,000	32,700
Wind	Offshore wind power	4,200	17,000
Wind	Total	15,178	49,760
Bioenergy	Biomass/biofuel/methane	62	488
Bioenergy	Total	62	488
Geothermal	Hydrothermal power systems	38	300
Geothermal	Enhanced geothermal systems	3,976	31,300
Geothermal	Total	4,014	31,653
Hydro	Hydropower	60	259
Hydro	Total	60	259
Total		212,236	481,970

Technical potential by state
	Solar								Wind			
	Urban Utility Scale PV		Rural Utility Scale PV		Rooftop PV		Concentrating Solar Power (CSP)		Onshore Wind Power		Offshore Wind Power	
State	MW	GWh	MW	GWh	MW	GWh	MW	GWh	MW	GWh	MW	GWh
Alabama	20,453	35,851	2,114,792	3,706,839	12,516	15,476	0	0	118	283	0	0
Alaska	112	166	9,005,193	8,282,976	1,292	—N/a	0	0	493,346	1,373,433	—N/a	—N/a
Arizona	52,611	121,306	5,147,087	11,867,694	14,880	22,736	3,527,624	12,544,334	10,904	26,036	—N/a	—N/a
Arkansas	15,957	28,961	2,747,478	4,986,389	6,773	8,485	0	0	9,200	22,892	—N/a	—N/a
California	111,404	246,008	4,010,367	8,855,917	75,908	106,411	2,725,676	8,490,916	34,110	89,862	654,833	2,662,580
Colorado	19,167	43,471	4,514,218	10,238,084	11,797	16,162	3,097,836	9,154,524	387,219	1,096,036	—N/a	—N/a
Connecticut	4,833	7,717	12,293	19,628	5,903	6,616	0	0	27	62	7,171	26,545
Delaware	9,120	14,856	167,170	272,333	1,876	2,185	0	0	10	22	15,038	60,654
Florida	39,850	72,787	2,812,653	5,137,347	49,407	63,987	130	359	0.40	1	9,649	34,684
Georgia	24,274	43,167	3,088,465	5,492,183	24,607	31,116	0	0	130	323	58,629	220,807
Hawaii	1,667	3,725	20,674	38,033	2,729	—N/a	5,539	15,370	2,468	7,787	736,945	2,836,735
Idaho	12,051	23,195	2,045,422	3,936,848	3,224	4,051	1,267,223	3,502,877	18,076	44,320	—N/a	—N/a
Illinois	63,597	103,552	4,969,164	8,090,985	26,312	30,086	0	0	249,882	649,468	15,872	66,070
Indiana	61,175	98,815	3,018,749	4,876,186	14,856	17,151	0	0	148,228	377,604	45	166
Iowa	15,574	27,092	4,020,606	6,994,159	7,191	8,646	0	0	570,714	1,723,588	—N/a	—N/a
Kansas	15,218	31,706	6,959,792	14,500,149	6,872	8,962	2,884,816	7,974,256	952,371	3,101,576	—N/a	—N/a
Kentucky	16,271	26,515	1,119,323	1,823,977	10,538	12,312	0	0	61	147	—N/a	—N/a
Louisiana	32,391	55,669	2,394,054	4,114,605	11,840	14,368	0	0	410	935	340,615	1,200,699
Maine	1,925	3,216	658,689	1,100,327	2,141	2,443	0	0	11,251	28,743	147,418	631,960
Maryland	18,180	28,551	373,097	585,949	12,738	14,850	0	0	1,483	3,632	51,909	200,852
Massachusetts	10,959	17,470	51,568	82,205	10,316	11,723	0	0	1,028	2,827	184,076	799,344
Michigan	33,570	50,845	3,443,547	5,215,640	21,520	23,528	0	0	59,042	143,908	422,577	1,739,801
Minnesota	20,128	33,370	6,510,103	10,792,814	12,486	14,322	0	0	489,271	1,428,525	29,215	100,455
Mississippi	15,243	26,366	2,879,856	4,981,252	6,968	8,614	0	0	0	0	3,213	10,172
Missouri	18,076	30,549	3,156,806	5,335,269	13,081	16,160	0	0	274,355	689,519	—N/a	—N/a
Montana	6,115	11,371	4,402,766	8,187,341	1,877	2,194	557,224	1,540,288	944,005	2,746,272	—N/a	—N/a
Nebraska	6,808	12,954	4,869,920	9,266,757	4,228	5,337	1,753,455	4,846,929	917,999	3,011,253	—N/a	—N/a
Nevada	10,785	24,894	3,732,055	8,614,454	7,137	10,767	2,557,909	8,295,753	7,247	17,709	—N/a	—N/a
New Hampshire	2,351	3,790	35,578	57,364	2,062	2,299	0	0	2,135	5,706	3,456	14,478
New Jersey	25,301	44,307	251,127	439,774	13,691	15,768	0	0	132	317	101,935	429,808
New Mexico	30,991	71,356	7,087,301	16,318,543	4,223	6,513	4,860,165	16,812,349	492,084	1,399,157	—N/a	—N/a
New York	32,764	52,803	926,127	1,492,566	25,149	28,780	0	0	25,781	63,566	146,077	614,280
North Carolina	37,894	68,346	2,346,827	4,232,790	23,096	28,420	0	0	808	2,037	306,020	1,269,627
North Dakota	2,744	4,871	5,482,940	9,734,448	1,622	1,917	13,042	36,050	770,195	2,537,825	—N/a	—N/a
Ohio	57,143	86,496	2,395,600	3,626,182	27,475	30,064	0	0	54,920	129,143	41,804	170,561
Oklahoma	25,619	50,041	4,782,752	9,341,920	9,337	12,443	1,812,952	5,068,036	516,822	1,521,652	—N/a	—N/a
Oregon	12,992	25,783	1,884,815	3,740,479	7,842	8,323	1,017,332	2,812,126	27,100	68,767	225,008	962,723
Pennsylvania	36,196	56,162	356,630	553,356	19,902	22,215	0	0	3,307	8,231	5,674	23,571
Rhode Island	1,160	1,788	8,844	13,636	1,534	1,711	0	0	47	130	20,965	89,115
South Carolina	19,099	33,835	1,555,141	2,754,973	11,531	14,413	0	0	185	428	133,217	542,218
South Dakota	2,442	4,574	5,344,810	10,008,873	1,682	2,083	589,556	1,629,660	882,413	2,901,858	—N/a	—N/a
Tennessee	28,598	50,243	1,266,995	2,225,990	16,227	19,685	0	0	309	766	—N/a	—N/a
Texas	154,251	294,684	20,411,044	38,993,582	60,256	78,717	7,743,420	22,786,750	1,901,530	5,552,400	271,443	1,101,063
Utah	14,057	30,492	2,390,260	5,184,878	5,645	7,514	1,638,154	5,067,547	13,104	31,552	—N/a	—N/a
Vermont	1,058	1,632	35,487	54,728	1,030	1,115	0	0	2,949	7,796	—N/a	—N/a
Virginia	15,664	27,451	1,074,135	1,882,467	18,669	22,267	0	0	1,794	4,589	89,073	361,054
Washington	19,313	33,690	996,410	1,738,151	13,494	13,599	58,502	161,713	18,479	47,250	120,964	488,025
DC	5	8	0	0	2,100	2,490	0	0	0	0	—N/a	—N/a
West Virginia	2,009	3,024	35,004	52,694	3,810	4,220	0	0	1,883	4,952	—N/a	—N/a
Wisconsin	34,930	54,939	3,205,830	5,042,259	12,262	13,939	0	0	103,757	255,266	80,672	317,755
Wyoming	3,604	7,232	2,854,267	5,727,224	1,170	1,551	1,955,846	5,406,407	552,073	1,653,857	—N/a	—N/a
TOTAL	1,217,699	2,231,694	152,973,829	280,613,217	664,825	818,733	38,066,401	116,146,245	10,954,759	32,784,005	4,223,514	16,975,802

Technical potential by state [continued]
	Bioenergy				Geothermal				Hydro			Electricity	Total
	Biomass/Biofuel		Methane		Hydrothermal		Enhanced Geothermal		Hydropower		Total	2010	2010
State	MW	GWh	MW	GWh	MW	GWh	MW	GWh	MW	GWh	GWh	GWh	GWh
Alabama	1,420	11,193	194	1,533	0	0	67,921	535,490	937	4,103	4,310,767	90,873	574,000
Alaska	65	513	8	62	1,958	15,437	—N/a	—N/a	5,405	23,676	9,696,264	6,247	188,000
Arizona	138	1,088	106	837	1,056	8,330	157,172	1,239,148	298	1,303	25,832,811	72,833	410,000
Arkansas	1,824	14,381	135	1,063	0	0	79,734	628,622	1,391	6,093	5,696,886	48,194	330,000
California	1,574	12,408	1,967	15,511	16,605	130,921	170,495	1,344,179	6,855	30,024	21,984,738	258,531	2,293,000
Colorado	370	2,913	155	1,224	1,135	8,954	158,759	1,251,658	1,778	7,789	21,820,815	52,918	445,000
Connecticut	63	495	53	415	0	0	7,113	56,078	211	922	118,478	30,392	221,000
Delaware	65	512	49	385	0	0	2,894	22,813	7	31	373,792	11,606	75,000
Florida	1,226	9,664	468	3,693	0	0	47,458	374,161	156	682	5,697,366	231,210	1,284,000
Georgia	1,862	14,682	282	2,221	0	0	44,800	353,206	454	1,988	6,159,694	140,672	925,000
Hawaii	66	524	25	200	2,617	20,632	—N/a	—N/a	594	2,602	2,925,608	10,017	80,000
Idaho	733	5,776	23	183	2,182	17,205	125,984	993,257	4,283	18,758	8,546,469	22,798	156,000
Illinois	3,518	27,738	536	4,222	0	0	85,750	676,056	1,115	4,883	9,653,061	144,761	1,154,000
Indiana	1,895	14,942	378	2,978	0	0	55,081	434,258	547	2,394	5,824,494	105,994	841,000
Iowa	3,488	27,502	181	1,425	0	0	76,914	606,390	643	2,818	9,391,621	45,445	437,000
Kansas	1,535	12,104	96	753	0	0	125,530	989,676	573	2,508	26,621,690	40,421	342,000
Kentucky	894	7,048	162	1,274	0	0	61,474	484,659	972	4,255	2,360,187	93,569	579,000
Louisiana	1,778	14,016	109	857	0	0	61,425	484,271	553	2,423	5,887,844	85,080	1,191,000
Maine	542	4,273	16	125	0	0	47,828	377,075	894	3,916	2,152,079	11,532	119,000
Maryland	267	2,102	156	1,227	0	0	10,990	86,649	186	814	924,626	65,335	434,000
Massachusetts	133	1,045	140	1,104	0	0	11,698	92,227	273	1,197	1,009,141	57,123	409,000
Michigan	1,187	9,358	322	2,539	0	0	58,073	457,850	270	1,181	7,644,650	103,649	820,000
Minnesota	2,583	20,362	131	1,030	0	0	46,903	369,785	287	1,255	12,761,917	67,800	547,000
Mississippi	1,802	14,210	137	1,077	0	0	70,910	559,056	505	2,211	5,602,959	49,687	349,000
Missouri	1,501	11,838	272	2,148	0	0	105,967	835,445	1,643	7,198	6,928,126	86,085	565,000
Montana	625	4,925	19	147	831	6,548	208,943	1,647,304	3,321	14,547	14,160,936	13,423	118,000
Nebraska	2,064	16,272	95	751	0	0	117,706	927,996	717	3,142	18,091,391	29,849	247,000
Nevada	37	289	41	325	5,749	45,321	160,093	1,262,175	193	846	18,272,533	33,773	189,000
New Hampshire	121	954	49	390	0	0	13,231	104,314	397	1,741	191,036	10,890	87,000
New Jersey	154	1,212	293	2,311	0	0	4,469	35,230	125	549	969,276	79,179	717,000
New Mexico	76	595	45	354	1,641	12,933	179,855	1,417,978	311	1,363	36,041,142	22,428	199,000
New York	705	5,558	374	2,950	0	0	47,615	375,401	1,532	6,711	2,642,615	144,624	1,093,000
North Carolina	1,632	12,870	479	3,780	0	0	53,366	420,741	693	3,037	6,041,648	136,415	793,000
North Dakota	1,038	8,186	4	30	0	0	104,037	820,226	79	347	13,143,900	12,956	141,000
Ohio	1,396	11,009	427	3,363	0	0	62,902	495,922	695	3,046	4,555,786	154,145	1,124,000
Oklahoma	524	4,128	122	965	0	0	98,892	779,667	689	3,016	16,781,869	57,846	455,000
Oregon	1,750	13,793	113	891	2,308	18,200	115,944	914,105	4,152	18,184	8,583,374	46,026	286,000
Pennsylvania	801	6,314	905	7,132	0	0	41,520	327,341	1,911	8,368	1,012,689	148,964	1,102,000
Rhode Island	18	143	60	474	0	0	1,458	11,492	14	59	118,549	7,799	58,000
South Carolina	886	6,985	181	1,430	0	0	46,183	364,105	431	1,889	3,720,276	82,479	487,000
South Dakota	1,063	8,380	30	235	0	0	116,942	921,973	239	1,047	15,478,682	11,356	111,000
Tennessee	773	6,095	252	1,984	0	0	54,335	428,380	1,312	5,745	2,738,888	103,522	660,000
Texas	2,039	16,078	748	5,898	0	0	384,355	3,030,251	686	3,006	71,862,428	358,458	3,449,000
Utah	55	434	54	428	1,647	12,982	119,150	939,381	806	3,528	11,278,736	28,044	224,000
Vermont	62	492	26	203	0	0	4,518	35,617	390	1,710	103,293	5,595	43,000
Virginia	998	7,866	317	2,498	0	0	36,877	290,737	835	3,657	2,602,587	113,806	733,000
Washington	1,562	12,312	192	1,514	323	2,547	71,413	563,024	6,221	27,249	3,089,074	90,380	597,000
DC	8	62	1	5	0	0	89	698	0.19	1	3,264	11,877	54,000
West Virginia	305	2,407	36	281	0	0	33,153	261,376	1,006	4,408	333,362	32,032	217,000
Wisconsin	1,423	11,222	263	2,073	0	0	82,087	647,173	1,455	2,287	6,346,913	68,752	528,000
Wyoming	64	503	6	50	174	1,373	135,728	1,070,079	1,289	4,445	13,872,721	17,113	157,000
TOTAL	50,707	399,774	11,232	88,551	38,227	301,382	3,975,735	31,344,696	60,329	258,953	481,963,052	3,754,493	28,636,000

Note: Total use is inflated to create an oil equivalence.

== See also ==
- American Council on Renewable Energy
- Catching the Sun (film)
- Energy conservation in the United States
- Energy policy of the United States
- List of wind farms in the United States
- List of U.S. states by electricity production from renewable sources
- Little Box Challenge

International:

- Renewable energy by country

General:

- Efficient energy use
- Lists of renewable energy topics
- Renewable energy commercialization
