= List of power stations in Texas =

Sources of Texas utility-scale electricity generation in gigawatt-hours, full-year 2025:
1. Natural gas: 288,179 (48.7%)
2. Wind: 129,458 (21.9%)
3. Coal: 68,889 (11.6%)
4. Solar: 58,634 (9.91%)
5. Nuclear: 41,632 (7.04%)
6. Other gases: 2,426 (0.41%)
7. Hydroelectric: 1,247 (0.21%)
8. Biomass: 930 (0.16%)
9. Petroleum: 232 (0.04%)

This is a list of electricity-generating power stations in the U.S. state of Texas, sorted by type and name. In 2024, Texas had a total summer capacity of 168.3 GW through all of its power plants, and a net generation of 566,502 GWh. In 2025, the electrical energy generation mix was 48.7% natural gas, 21.9% wind, 11.6% coal, 9.9% solar, 7% nuclear, and less than 1% from hydroelectric, biomass, petroleum, and other gases. Small-scale photovoltaic installations generated an additional 5,439 GWh to the Texas electrical grid in 2025.

Texas produces and consumes far more electrical energy than any other U.S. state. It generates almost twice as much electricity as the next highest generating state, Florida. Texas has an expanding variety of generating sources to meet consumption growth. Installed wind capacity grew to 35,000 MW and solar capacity grew to 10,300 MW at the end of 2021. Wind generation exceeded nuclear in 2014 and coal in 2020, becoming the second largest energy source in the state. Fossil-fuel and nuclear generation has remained nearly constant over the past two decades, with natural gas gradually replacing coal.

Texas oil extraction operations in year 2019 included the flaring of 250 billion cubic feet of associated petroleum gas, with much of it concentrated in the Permian basin near Midland. This amount of wasted natural gas could have met all of the state's residential heating and cooking needs, or could have generated an amount of electrical energy nearly equal to the state's 40,000 GWh of nuclear generation.

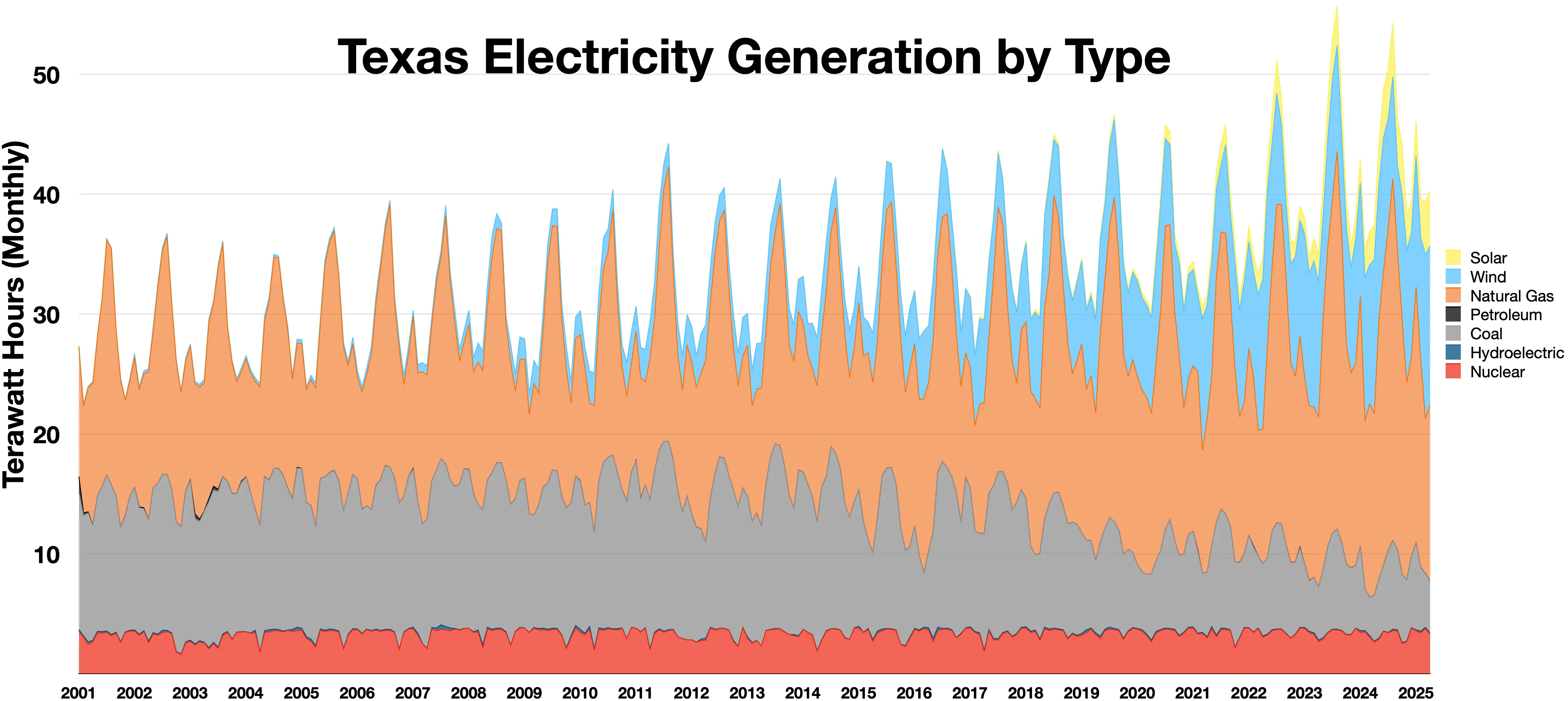
Texas electricity generation by type, 2001-2024

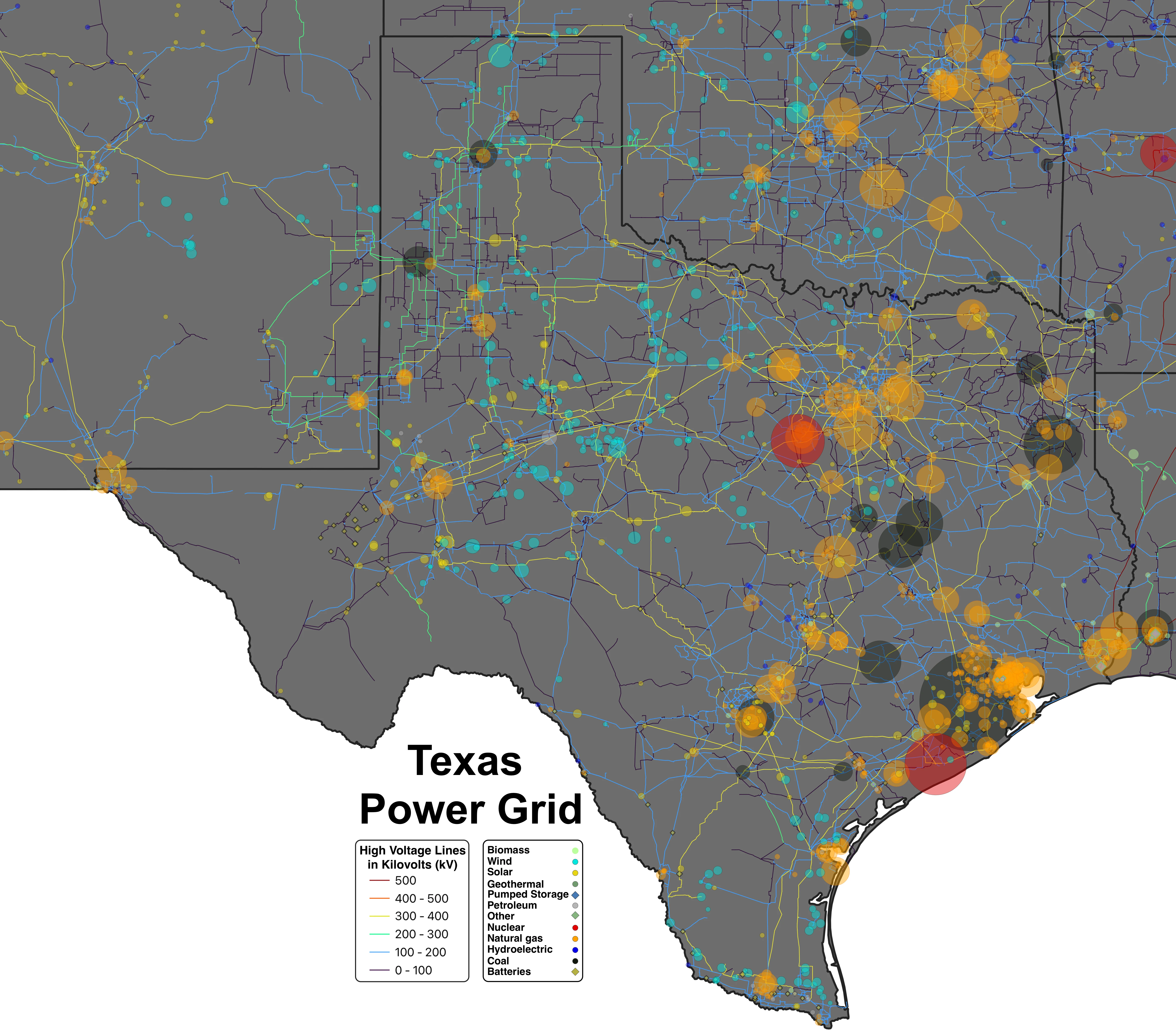
Texas power grid

Location of power stations in Texas
nuclear, gas, hydroelectric, coal, wind / solar / biomass
cities

== Nuclear power stations ==
Name	Location	Coordinates	Capacity (MW)	Refs
South Texas Project Electric Generating Station	Matagorda County	28.795556°N 96.048889°W	2,500	
Comanche Peak Nuclear Power Plant	Somervell County	32.298333°N 97.785°W	2,208	

== Fossil-fuel power stations ==
Data from the U.S. Energy Information Administration serves as a general reference.

=== Coal and lignite ===
A useful map of coal generation plants is provided by the Sierra Club.

Name	Location	Coordinates	Capacity (MW)	Year opened	Scheduled retirement	Refs
Coleto Creek	Fannin	28°42′46″N 97°12′51″W	622	1980	Scheduled to close by 2027	
Fayette	La Grange, in Fayette County	29°55′02″N 97°14′58″W	1,690	1979 (615MW); 1980 (615MW); 1988 (460MW)		
J.K. Spruce	Bexar County	29°18′27″N 98°19′25″W	1,444	1992 (566MW); 2010 (878MW)		
Limestone	Jewett	31°25′27″N 96°15′13″W	1,850	1985 (893MW); 1986 (957MW)		
Major Oak Power	Robertson County	31°5′29″N 96°41′34″W	349	1990 (150MW); 1991 (150MW)		
Martin Lake	Rusk County	32°15′35″N 94°34′13″W	2,380	1977 (793MW); 1978 (793MW); 1979 (793MW)		
Oak Grove	Robertson County	31°10′48″N 96°29′30″W	1,796	2010 (917MW); 2011 (879MW)		
Pirkey	Hallsville	32°27′37″N 94°29′11″W	721	1985	Scheduled to close in 2023	
San Miguel Lignite Powerplant	Christine	28°42′15″N 98°28′38″W	391	1982		
Sandy Creek	Riesel	31°28′29″N 96°57′23″W	1,008	2013		
Tolk	Lamb County	34°11′05″N 102°35′53″W	1,136	1982 (568MW); 1985 (568MW)	Scheduled to close by 2032	
W. A. Parish (units 5 to 8)	Fort Bend County	29°28′34″N 95°38′0″W	2,736	1977 (734MW); 1978 (734MW); 1980 (614MW); 1982 (654MW)		
Welsh	Mount Pleasant	33°03′17″N 94°50′24″W	1,116	1977 (558MW); 1982 (558MW)	To cease using coal in 2028	

==== Defunct ====
Name	Location	Coordinates	Capacity (MW)	Decommissioned	Refs
Big Brown	Freestone County	31°49′14″N 96°03′22″W	1,186	2018	
Gibbons Creek	Grimes County	30°37′9″N 96°4′54″W	453	2018	
Harrington	Potter County	35°17′50″N 101°44′51″W	1,080	2025	
J.T. Deely	Bexar County	29°18′25″N 98°19′12″W	932	2018	
Monticello	Titus County	33°05′28″N 95°02′17″W	1,980	2018	
Oklaunion	Wilbarger County	34°4′57″N 99°10′34″W	650	2020	
Sandow	Milam County	30°33′51″N 97°03′50″W	1,252	2018	

=== Natural gas ===
Data from U.S. Energy Information Administration. Additional data sources:

Name	Location	Coordinates	Capacity (MW)	Generation type	Year opened	Refs
Arthur von Rosenburg	Bexar County	29.2570°N 98.3840°W	518.0	2x1 combined cycle	2000	
Antelope Elk Energy Center	Abernathy, Texas	33.8632°N 101.8431°W	738.0	Reciprocating engine (x18) simple cycle (x3)	2011 (157MW); 2016 (581MW)	
Barney M Davis	Nueces County	27.6064°N 97.3117°W	938.0	Steam turbine 2x1 combined cycle	1974 (300MW); 2010 (638MW)	
Bastrop Energy Center	Bastrop County	30.1458°N 97.5500°W	540.0	2x1 combined cycle	2002	
Baytown Energy Center	Chambers County	29.7731°N 94.9019°W	800.0	3x1 combined cycle	2002	
Bacliff	Galveston County	29.4923°N 94.9848°W	324.0	Simple cycle (x6)	2018	
Bayou Cogen	Harris County	29.6225°N 95.0458°W	300.0	Simple cycle (x4)	2014-2016	
Black Hawk	Hutchinson County	35.6957°N 101.3600°W	225.0	Simple cycle	1991/2005	
Bosque County Peaking	Bosque County	27.6064°N 97.3117°W	758.0	3x2 combined cycle	2001/2010	
C R Wing Cogen	Howard County	32.2732°N 101.4224°W	212.0	2x1 combined cycle	1987	
Cedar Bayou	Chambers County	29.7500°N 94.9256°W	1,495.0	Steam turbine (x2)	1970/1972	
Cedar Bayou 4	Chambers County	29.7516°N 94.9231°W	502.0	2x1 combined cycle	2009	
Channel Energy Center	Pasadena	29.7189°N 95.2319°W	768.0	3x1 combined cycle	2002/2014	
Channelview	Harris County	29°50′08″N 95°07′27″W	830.0	4x1 combined cycle	2002	
Colorado Bend Energy Center	Wharton, Tx	29.2878°N 96.0683°W	484.0	2x1 combined cycle (x2)	2002/2008	
Colorado Bend II	Wharton County	29.2894°N 96.0654°W	1,140.0	2x1 combined cycle	2017	
Corpus Christi Energy Center	Nueces County	30.2588°N 93.7353°W	469.0	2x1 combined cycle	2002	
Cottonwood Energy Center	Newton County	30.2588°N 93.7353°W	1,180.0	1x1 combined cycle (x4)	2003	
Decker Creek Power Station	Austin	30.3033°N 97.6128°W	928.0	Steam turbine (x2) simple cycle (x4)	1975/1978 (724MW); 2008 (204MW)	
DeCordova	Hood County	32.4031°N 97.7006°W	282.0	Simple cycle (x4)	1990	
Deer Park	Harris County	29°42′55″N 95°08′10″W	830.0	5x1 combined cycle	2004/2014	
Eastman Cogen Facility	Harrison County	32.4481°N 94.6903°W	410.0	2x1 combined cycle	2001	
Ennis	Ellis County	32.3200°N 96.6750°W	360.0	1x1 combined cycle	2002	
ExxonMobil Baytown	Harris County	29.7591°N 95.0096°W	454.0	Simple cycle (x9)	1977-2004	
ExxonMobil Beaumont	Jefferson County	30.0636°N 94.0753°W	605.0	Steam turbine (x5) simple cycle (x4)	1966-1993 (138MW); 1993-2005 (467MW)	
Formosa Utility Venture	Newton County	30.2588°N 93.7353°W	597.3	7x3 combined cycle	1994/2003	
Forney Energy Center	Kaufman County	32°45′46″N 96°29′00″W	1,784.0	6x2 combined cycle	2003	
Freeport Energy	Brazoria County	28.9913°N 95.4075°W	516.0	Simple cycle 2x1 combined cycle (x2)	1978 (59MW); 1982-1984 (457MW)	
Freeport Energy Center	Brazoria County	28.9888°N 95.3954°W	219.4	1x1 combined cycle	2007	
Freestone	Freestone County	31.8907°N 96.1131°W	951.0	2x1 combined cycle (x2)	2002	
Galveston Power Station 4	Galveston County	29.3782°N 94.9219°W	172.0	2x1 combined cycle	1986	
Graham	Young County	33.1344°N 98.6117°W	624.0	Steam turbine (x2)	1960/1969	
Green Power	Galveston County	29.3781°N 95.9327°W	624.0	3x2 combined cycle	2003/2009	
Greens Bayou	Harris County	29.8222°N 95.2194°W	330.0	Simple cycle (x6)	1976	
Gregory	San Patricio County	27.8893°N 97.2584°W	550.0	2x1 combined cycle	2000	
Guadalupe	Guadalupe County	29°37′32″N 98°08′28″W	1,000.0	2x1 combined cycle (x2)	2000	
Hal C Weaver	UT-Austin	30.2867°N 97.7356°W	146.8	1x1 combined cycle 1x3 combined cycle	2004 (72.6MW); 2010 (74.2MW)	
Handley	Tarrant County	32.7283°N 97.2192°W	1,265.0	Steam turbine (x3)	1963/1977	
Harrington	Potter County	35°17′50″N 101°44′51″W	1,080		2025	
Harrison County	Harrison County	32.3958°N 94.4367°W	514.4	2x1 combined cycle	2002	
Hays Energy Project	Hays County	29°46′50″N 97°59′22″W	1,100.0	Combined cycle (x4)	2004	
Hidalgo Energy Center	Hidalgo County	26.3417°N 98.1758°W	470.0	2x1 combined cycle	2000	
Houston Chemical Complex	Harris County	29.7314°N 95.0839°W	263.0	3x1 combined cycle	1982/2005	
Ingleside Cogen	San Patricio County	27.8828°N 97.2428°W	310.0	1x1 combined cycle	1999	
J Robert Massengale	Lubbock County	33.6039°N 101.8408°W	74.0	2x1 combined cycle	1957/2000	
Jack County	Wise County	31.8907°N 96.1131°W	1,240.0	2x1 combined cycle (x2)	2006/2011	
Jack Fusco Energy Center; Brazos Valley	Fort Bend County	29.4731°N 95.6244°W	520.0	2x1 combined cycle	2003	
Johnson County	Johnson County	32.3994°N 97.4078°W	267.0	1x1 combined cycle	1996	
Jones Generating Station	Lubbock County	33°31′27.5″N 101°44′23″W	820.0	Steam turbine (x2) simple cycle (x2)	1971/1974 (486MW); 2011/2013 (334MW)	
Knox Lee Power Station	Gregg County	32.3770976°N 94.6413185°W	501.0	Steam turbine (x3)	1950/1952/1974	
Lake Hubbard	Dallas County	32.8358°N 96.5458°W	915.0	Steam turbine (x2)	1970/1973	
Lamar Power Project	Lamar County	33.6308°N 95.5900°W	1,036.0	2x1 combined cycle (x2)	2000	
Lewis Creek	Montgomery County	30.4356°N 95.5210°W	503.0	Steam turbine (x2)	1970/1971	
Lost Pines 1	Bastrop County	30.1478°N 97.2714°W	511.0	2x1 combined cycle	2001	
Magic Valley	Hidalgo County	26.3403°N 98.1900°W	682.0	2x1 combined cycle	2002	
Midlothian	Ellis County	32°25′48″N 97°03′18″W	1,734.0	Combined cycle (x6)	2000/2001	
Montana Station	El Paso County	31.8239°N 106.2119°W	352.0	Simple cycle (x4)	2015/2016	
Morgan Creek	Mitchell County	32.3358°N 100.9156°W	402.0	Simple cycle (x6)	1988	
Mountain Creek	Dallas County	32.7231°N 96.9358°W	808.0	Steam turbine (x3)	1956/1958/1967	
Mustang	Yoakum County	32.9728°N 102.7417°W	913.0	2x1 combined cycle simple cycle (x3)	1999/2000 (463MW); 2006-2013 (450MW)	
Newman	El Paso County	31.9836°N 106.4318°W	550.0	2x1 combined cycle (x2)	1975/2011	
Nichols	Potter County	35.2825°N 101.7468°W	457.0	Steam turbine (x3)	1960/1962/1968	
Nueces Bay	Nueces County	27.8194°N 97.4192°W	638.0	2x1 combined cycle	1972/2010	
Odessa Ector	Ector County	31°50′16″N 102°19′40″W	1,135.0	2x1 combined cycle (x2)	2001	
Optim Energy Altura	Harris County	29.8161°N 95.1077°W	540.0	6x1 combined cycle	1986	
O W Sommers	Bexar County	29.3081°N 98.3242°W	830.0	Steam turbine (x2)	1972/1974	
Oyster Creek	Brazoria County	28.9802°N 95.3420°W	425.0	3x1 combined cycle	1994	
Paris Energy Center	Lamar County	27.8893°N 97.2584°W	236.0	2x1 combined cycle	1989	
Pasadena Cogen	Harris County	29.7247°N 95.1765°W	720.0	1x1 combined cycle 2x1 combined cycle	1998 (225MW); 2000 (495MW)	
Permian Basin	Ward County	31.5839°N 102.9633°W	321.0	Simple cycle (x5)	1988/1990	
Plant X	Lamb County	34°09′57″N 102°24′38″W	442.0	Steam turbine (x4)	1952-1964	
Port Arthur Air Products	Jefferson County	29.8665°N 93.9651°W	138.4	Simple cycle (x3)	2006-2012	
Port Arthur Refinery	Jefferson County	29.8885°N 93.9510°W	550.0	5x3 combined cycle	1957-2011	
Quail Run Energy Center	Ector County	31.8414°N 102.3150°W	472.0	2x1 combined cycle (x2)	2002/2007	
R W Miller	Palo Pinto County	32.6581°N 98.3103°W	574.0	Steam turbine (x3) simple cycle (x2)	1968-1975 (366MW); 1994 (208MW)	
Ray Olinger	Collin County	33.0681°N 96.4525°W	320.0	Steam turbine (x3)	1967/1971/1976	
Rio Nogales	Seguin, Texas	29°35′36″N 97°58′25″W	800.0	3x1 combined cycle	2002	
Roland C. Dansby	Brazos County	30.7217°N 96.4608°W	204.2	Steam turbine simple cycle (x2)	1978 (110MW); 2004/2010 (94.2MW)	
Sabine / Sabine River Works	Orange County	30°01′27″N 93°52′30″W	2,124.0	Steam turbine (x4); 1x1 combined cycle 2x1 combined cycle (x2)	1962-1979 (1,530MW); 1987 (87MW); 2001 (507MW)	
Sam Bertron	Harris County	29°43′35″N 95°03′33″W	875			
Sam Rayburn	Victoria County	28.8947°N 97.1350°W	205.0	Simple cycle (x2); 3x1 combined cycle	1963 (21MW); 2003 (184MW)	
San Jacinto	Harris County	29.6948°N 95.0406°W	162.0	Simple cycle (x2)	1995	
Sherman	Grayson County	33.5779°N 96.6151°W	758.0	2x1 combined cycle	2014	
Sim Gideon	Bastrop County	30.1456°N 97.2708°W	608.0	Steam turbine (x3)	1965/1968/1972	
Sand Hill Energy Center	Travis County	30.209°N 97.613°W	596.0	Simple cycle (x6); 1x1 combined cycle	2001/2010 (284MW); 2004 (312MW)	
Stryker Creek	Cherokee County	31.9398°N 94.9898°W	669.0	Steam turbine (x2)	1958/1965	
Sweeny Cogen	Brazoria County	29.0728°N 95.7450°W	436.0	Simple cycle (x4)	1997/2000	
T H Wharton	Harris County	29.9417°N 95.5306°W	1,025.0	Simple cycle x4x1 combined cycle (x2)	1967/1975 (361MW) 1972/1974 (664MW)	
Tenaska Frontier Generation Station	Grimes County	30.5924°N 95.9178°W	860.0	3x1 combined cycle	2000	
Tenaska Gateway Generation Station	Rusk County	32.0184097°N 94.6192779°W	845.0	3x1 combined cycle	2001	
Temple 1&2	Bell County	31.0568°N 97.3160°W	1,500.0	2x1 combined cycle (x2)	2014/2015	
Texas City Cogen	Galveston County	29.3787°N 94.9439°W	451.0	3x1 combined cycle	1987	
Thomas C. Ferguson	Llano County	30°33′27″N 98°22′20″W	516.0	2x1 combined cycle	2014	
V H Braunig	Bexar County	29.2567°N 98.3825°W	1,050.0	Steam turbine (x3) simple cycle (x4)	1966-1973 (859MW); 2010 (191MW)	
Victoria	Victoria County	28.7883°N 97.0100°W	300.0	1x1 combined cycle	1963/2009	
W. A. Parish	Fort Bend County	29°28′34″N 95°38′0″W	1,043.0	Steam turbine (x4) simple cycle (x2)	1958-1968 (956MW); 1967/2013 (87MW)	
Wilkes	Marion County	32°50′53″N 94°32′52″W	879.0	Steam turbine (x3)	1964/1970/1971	
Winchester Power Park	Fayette County	30.0381°N 96.9875°W	176.0	Simple cycle (x4)	2010	
Wise County	Wise County	33.0583°N 97.9103°W	670.0	2x1 combined cycle	2004	
Wolf Hollow 1	Hood County	32°20′05″N 97°44′04″W	750.0	2x1 combined cycle (x2)	2003	
Wolf Hollow 2	Hood County	32.340666°N 97.733998°W	1200.0	2x1 combined cycle (x2)	2017	

==== Defunct ====
Name	Location	Coordinates	Capacity (MW)	Decommissioned	Refs
Eagle Mountain	Tarrant County	32.9056°N 97.4792°W	696	2005	
Paint Creek	Haskell County	33°04′46″N 99°34′51″W	218	2002	
P.H. Robinson	Galveston County	29°29′15″N 94°58′46″W	2,316	2009	

== Renewable power stations ==
Data from the U.S. Energy Information Administration serves as a general reference.

=== Biomass ===
Name	Location	Coordinates	Capacity (MW)	Refs
Nacogdoches Generating Facility	Nacogdoches County	31.8321°N 94.9006°W	100	
Rio Grande Valley Sugar Growers	Santa Rosa	26°16′11″N 97°52′0″W	23.5	
Snider Industries	Marshall	32°34′45″N 94°22′27″W	5	
Texarkana Mill	Cass County	33°15′27″N 94°04′17″W	65	
Woodville Renewable Power	Woodville	30°44′56″N 94°26′10″W	49	

==== Defunct ====
Name	Location	Coordinates	Capacity (MW)	Decommissioned	Refs
Aspen Biomass Power Plant	Lufkin	31°22′9″N 94°44′22″W	44	2016	

=== Hydroelectric dams ===
Name	Location	Type	Capacity (MW)	Operator	Year opened	Refs
Amistad Dam	Val Verde County, Texas	Hydro	132	International Boundary and Water Commission	1969	
Buchanan Dam	Colorado River (Texas)	Hydro	48	Lower Colorado River Authority	1937	
Denison Dam	Bryan County, Oklahoma / Grayson County, Texas	Hydro	80	United States Army Corps of Engineers	1945	
Falcon Dam	Rio Grande	Hydro	63	International Boundary and Water Commission	1954	
Inks Dam	Colorado River (Texas)	Hydro	15	Lower Colorado River Authority	1938	
Mansfield Dam	Colorado River (Texas)	Hydro	102	Lower Colorado River Authority	1941	
R.C. Thomas Hydroelectric Project	Trinity River (Texas)	Hydro	24	East Texas Electrical Cooperative	2020	
Sam Rayburn Dam	Angelina River	Hydro	52	United States Army Corps of Engineers	1966	
Max Starcke Dam	Colorado River (Texas)	Hydro	41	Lower Colorado River Authority	1951	
Toledo Bend Dam	Sabine River (Texas–Louisiana)	Hydro	92	Sabine River Authority of Texas	1969	
Tom Miller Dam	Colorado River (Texas)	Hydro	17	Lower Colorado River Authority	1940	
Whitney Dam	Bosque and Hill counties, Texas	Hydro	43	United States Army Corps of Engineers	1951	
Wirtz Dam	Llano and Burnet counties, Texas	Hydro	60	Lower Colorado River Authority	1951	

=== Wind farms ===
The following list emphasizes operating wind farms in Texas that are 100 MW or larger.

Name	Location	Coordinates	Capacity (MW)	Turbine manufacturer	Year opened	Refs
Amazon Wind Farm Texas	Scurry	32°51′50″N 100°58′30″W	253	GE Energy	2017	
Anacacho Wind Farm	Kinney	29°11′41″N 100°11′16″W	100	Vestas	2012	
Azure Sky Wind Project			350.2		2024	
Bearkat Wind Farm	Glasscock	31°43′38″N 101°34′55″W	196.7	Vestas	2017	
Bethel Wind Farm	Castro	34°34′29″N 102°28′10″W	276	GE Energy	2017	
Blue Cloud Wind Farm	Bailey, Lamb	34°04′17″N 102°36′08″W	148.4	Vestas	2018	
Buffalo Gap Wind Farm	Nolan, Taylor	32°18′38″N 100°08′57″W	523.3	Mitsubishi	2008	
Brazos Wind Farm	Scurry	32°57′00″N 101°08′49″W	160	Vestas	2003	
Breunnings Breeze Wind Farm	Willacy	26°27′49″N 97°49′47″W	228	Acciona	2018	
Bull Creek Wind Farm	Borden	32°55′47″N 101°35′03″W	180	Mitsubishi	2008	
Cactus Flats Hill Wind Farm	Concho	31°19′59″N 98°52′48″W	148.4	Vestas	2018	
Camp Springs Energy Center	Scurry	32°43′56″N 100°48′28″W	250.5	GE Energy	2008	
Canyon Wind Farm			308.8		2024	
Capricorn Ridge Wind Farm	Coke, Sterling	31°54′11″N 100°54′04″W	662.5	GE Energy/Siemens	2008	
Chapman Ranch Wind Farm	Nueces	27°37′23″N 97°31′46″W	236	Acciona	2017	
Cedro Hill Wind Farm	Webb	27°34′35″N 98°54′18″W	150	GE Energy	2010	
Colbeck's Corner Wind Farm	Carson, Gray	35°15′15″N 101°11′12″W	200	GE Energy	2016	
Desert Sky Wind Farm	Pecos	30°54′57″N 102°6′29″W	160.5	GE Energy	2001	
Elbow Creek Wind Project	Howard	32°12′57″N 101°25′51″W	121.9	Siemens	2008	
Electra Wind Farm	Wilbarger	34°08′48″N 99°29′39″W	230	GE Energy	2016	
Falvez Astra Wind Farm	Randall	34°46′36″N 102°03′48″W	163.2	GE Energy	2017	
Flat Top Wind Farm	Mills	31°40′32″N 98°31′04″W	200	Vestas	2018	
Goat Mountain Wind Ranch	Coke, Sterling	31°57′5″N 100°47′55″W	149.6	Mitsubishi	2009	
Goldthwaite Wind Farm	Mills	31°24′28″N 98°28′47″W	148.6	GE Energy	2014	
Goodnight Wind Farm			265.5		2024	
Grandview Wind Farm	Carson	35°20′44″N 101°22′50″W	211	GE Energy	2014	
Green Pastures Wind Farm (I & II)	Baylor, Knox	33°37′42″N 99°24′40″W	300	Acciona	2015	
Gulf Wind Farm	Kenedy	27°05′16″N 97°35′22″W	283	Mitsubishi	2009	
Hackberry Wind Project	Shackelford	32°49′27″N 99°16′42″W	165	Siemens	2008	
Hale Wind Farm	Hale	33°55′40″N 101°44′32″W	478	Vestas	2019	
Hereford Wind Farm	Deaf Smith	34°49′05″N 102°24′34″W	200	GE Energy/Vestas	2014	
Hidalgo Wind Farm	Hidalgo	26°27′56″N 98°24′40″W	250	Vestas	2016	
Horse Creek Wind Farm	Haskell	33°09′36″N 99°45′00″W	230	GE Energy	2016	
Horse Hollow Wind Energy Center	Nolan, Taylor	32°11′24″N 100°01′48″W	735.5	GE Energy/Siemens	2006	
Javelina Wind Energy Center	Webb, Duval	27°26′24″N 98°54′36″W	748.7	GE Energy	2018	
Jumbo Road Wind	Castro	34°49′05″N 102°24′35″W	300	GE Energy	2015	
Karankawa	Patricio/Bee	28°09′14″N 97°46′12″W	307	GE Energy	2020	
Keechi Wind Project	Jack	31°31′1″N 95°57′12″W	110	Vestas	2015	
King Mountain Wind Farm	Upton	31°14′16″N 102°14′16″W	278.2	Bonus/GE Energy	2001	
Langford Wind Farm	Tom Green, Schleicher, Irion	31°06′15″N 100°39′39″W	150	GE Energy	2009	
Live Oak Wind Farm	Schleicher	30°53′56″N 100°36′37″W	199.5	Gamesa	2018	
Logan's Gap Wind Farm	Comanche	31°49′21″N 98°41′26″W	200	Siemens	2015	
Lone Star Wind Farm	Shackelford, Callahan	32°16′22″N 99°27′22″W	400	Gamesa	2008	
Los Vientos Wind Farm	Starr, Willacy	26°22′00″N 98°49′00″W	912	Mitsubishi/Siemens/Vestas	2016	
Magic Valley Wind Farm	Willacy	26°24′57″N 97°33′56″W	203	Vestas	2012	
Majestic Wind Farm	Carson	35°22′50″N 101°31′41″W	161.1	Vestas	2012	
Mariah North Wind Farm	Parmer	34°31′49″N 102°55′28″W	230.4	GE Energy	2016	
McAdoo Wind Farm	Dickens	33°45′06″N 100°58′09″W	150	GE Energy	2008	
Mesquite Creek Wind	Borden, Dawson	32°42′00″N 101°44′28″W	211	GE Energy	2015	
Miami Wind Energy Center	Roberts, Hemphill, Gray, Wheeler	35°39′14″N 100°32′19″W	289	GE Energy	2014	
Notrees Windpower	Ector, Winkler	31°59′48″N 102°50′22″W	150	Vestas/GE Energy	2009	
Palo Duro Wind Energy Center	Hansford, Ochiltree	36°24′51″N 101°02′00″W	250	GE Energy	2014	
Panhandle Wind Farm (I & II)	Carson	35°25′39″N 101°15′11″W	400	GE/Siemens	2014	
Panther Creek Wind Farm	Big Spring	31°59′00″N 101°7′00″W	457.5	GE Energy	2009	
Papalote Creek Wind Farm	San Patricio	27°58′48″N 97°23′28″W	380	Siemens/Vestas	2010	
Patriot Wind Farm	Nueces	27°35′34″N 97°38′53″W	226	Vestas	2019	
Peñascal Wind Power Project	Kenedy	27°6′44″N 97°32′26″W	605.2	Mitsubishi, Gamesa	2010	
Prairie Hill Wind Project	Limestone, McLennan	31°34′04″N 96°48′45″W	300	Nordex	2020	
Rattlesnake Wind Energy Center	Glasscock	31°46′33″N 101°44′27″W	207	GE Energy	2015	
Rattlesnake Wind Farm	McCulloch	31°15′08″N 99°31′35″W	160	Goldwind	2018	
Roadrunner Wind Farm			256		2024	
Rocksprings Wind Farm	Val Verde	29°46′16″N 100°46′31″W	180	GE Energy	2017	
Roscoe Wind Farm	Roscoe	32°15′52″N 100°20′39″W	781.5	GE Energy/Siemens/Mitsubishi	2009	
Route 66 Wind Farm	Carson, Armstrong	34°56′14″N 101°26′02″W	150	Vestas	2015	
Salt Fork Wind Farm	Donley, Gray	35°11′18″N 100°51′14″W	174	Vestas	2016	
Santa Rita Wind Energy	Reagan	31°10′53″N 101°19′08″W	300	GE Energy	2018	
Shannon Wind	Clay	33°30′13″N 98°22′25″W	204	GE Energy	2015	
Sherbino Wind Farm	Pecos	30°48′40″N 102°21′43″W	300	Vestas	2011	
South Plains Wind Farm	Floyd	34°11′07″N 101°22′18″W	500.3	Vestas	2016	
Spinning Spur Wind Ranch	Oldham, Potter	35°13′37″N 102°12′45″W	516	GE Energy/Siemens/Vestas	2015	
Stella Wind Farm	Kenedy	26°56′21″N 97°41′25″W	201	Acciona	2018	
Stephens Ranch Wind Farm (I & II)	Borden, Lynn	32°55′35″N 101°38′52″W	376	GE Energy	2015	
Sweetwater Wind Farm	Nolan	32°21′33″N 100°21′20″W	585.3	GE Energy/Siemens/Mitsubishi	2007	
Tahoka Wind Farm	Lynn	33°09′03″N 100°40′45″W	300	GE Energy	2018	
Trent Wind Farm	Nolan	32°25′19″N 100°12′44″W	150	GE Energy	2001	
Trinity Hills Wind Farm	Archer, Young	33°23′14″N 98°39′11″W	225	Clipper	2012	
Turkey Track Energy Center	Nolan, Coke, Runnels	32°11′05″N 100°16′20″W	170	GE Energy	2008	
Wake Wind Farm	Crosby	33°50′24″N 101°06′11″W	257.2	GE Energy	2016	
Wildorado Wind Ranch	Oldham, Potter, Randall	35°17′31″N 102°18′11″W	161	Siemens	2007	
Willow Springs	Haskell	33°20′35″N 99°38′30″W	250	GE Energy	2017	
Woodward Mountain Wind Ranch	Pecos	30°57′16″N 102°25′22″W	159	Vestas	2001	

=== Solar farms ===
The following list emphasizes operating solar photovoltaic farms in Texas that are 20 MW or larger.

Name	Location	Coordinates	Capacity (MW_{AC})	Year Completed	Refs
Emerald Grove Solar	Crane County	31.096018650353134, -102.34498206137978	108	2022	
Brightside Solar	Live Oak County	28.453379402854512, -97.97791830349912	50	2022	
Lumina Solar Project I & II			641	2024	
Hecate Energy Frye Solar			500	2024	
Roadrunner 1 & 2	Upton County	31.2194°N 102.1922°W	497	2019/2020	
Orion I+III Solar			450	2024	
Permian	Andrews County		420	2019	+40MW battery
Waco Solar			400	2024	
Five Wells Solar Center			355.4	2023	+259 MW battery
Phoebe	Winkler County	31.8434°N 102.8683°W	250	2019	
Sparta Solar			250	2024	
Hopkins Energy			250	2024	
Rambler Solar	Tom Green County	31.5170°N 100.6000°W	200	2020	
Holstein Solar	Nolan County	32.1041°N 100.1624°W	200	2020	
Texas Solar Nova 2			200	2024	
Cutlass Solar II			200	2024	
AP Sunray			200	2024	
Tres Bahias			196.3	2024	
Oberon	Ector County	31.7033°N 102.7012°W	180	2020	
Upton Solar 2	Upton County	31.2418°N 102.2903°W	180	2018	
Midway Solar	Pecos County	30.9910°N 102.2214°W	178	2019	
Zier Solar			160	2024	
Roserock Solar	Pecos County	30.9602°N 103.3067°W	157	2016	
Buckthorn Solar 1	Pecos County	30.5755°N 102.5513°W	154	2018	
East Pecos Solar	Pecos County	31.0009°N 102.2817°W	120	2017	
Castle Gap Solar	Upton County	31.2550°N 102.2720°W	116	2017	
Alamo 6	Pecos County	30.9931°N 102.2708°W	110	2017	
Alamo 7	Haskell County	33.0068°N 99.6044°W	106	2016	
Lamesa Solar	Dawson County	32.7156°N 101.9265°W	102	2017	
Lapetus	Andrews County	32.4601°N 102.6728°W	100	2019	
BPL Crown Solar	Falls County	31.3331 N 97.0839 W	100	2024	
BPL Sol Solar	Falls County	31.3331 N 97.0839 W	100	2024	
Alamo 5	Uvalde	29.2167°N 99.7161°W	95	2016	
Pearl Solar	Pecos County	30.9878°N 102.2683°W	50	2017	
SolaireHolman Solar	Brewster County	30.4551°N 103.4747°W	50	2017	
Ivory	Dawson County	32.7156°N 101.9265°W	50	2018	
Alamo 1	San Antonio	29.2717°N 98.4447°W	41	2013	
Alamo 4	Brackettville	29.3289°N 100.3839°W	39.6	2014	
Webberville Solar Farm	Webberville	30.2383°N 97.5086°W	30	2011	

== Utility companies ==
The following is a list of utility companies that operate in Texas:

- AEP (American Electric Power)
- Austin Energy (Note: Public utility)
- Bailey County Electric Cooperative
- Bandera Electric Cooperative
- Bartlett Electric Cooperative
- Big Country Electric Cooperative
- Bluebonnet Electric Cooperative
- Bowie-Cass Electric Cooperative
- Brazos Electric Cooperative
- Bryan Texas Utilities (BTU)
- Calpine
- CenterPoint
- Central Texas Electric Cooperative
- Cherokee County Electric Cooperative Association
- Coleman County Electric Cooperative
- Comanche Electric Cooperative Association
- Concho Valley Electric Cooperative
- Cooke County Electric Cooperative Association
- CoServ Electric
- CPS Energy
- Deaf Smith Electric Cooperative
- Deep East Texas Electric Cooperative
- East Texas Electric Cooperative
- El Paso Electric
- Entergy, Texas (Formerly Gulf States Utilities) Is a separate subsidiary of Entergy Corporation
- Fannin County Electric Cooperative
- Farmers Electric Cooperative
- Fayette Electric Cooperative
- Federated Rural Electric Insurance Exchange
- Fort Belknap Electric Cooperative
- Golden Spread Electric Cooperative
- Grayson-Collin Electric Cooperative
- Greenbelt Electric Cooperative
- Guadalupe Valley Electric Cooperative
- Hamilton County Electric Cooperative Association
- Harmon Electric
- Heart of Texas Electric Cooperative
- HILCO Electric Cooperative
- Houston County Electric Cooperative
- J-A-C Electric Cooperative
- Jackson Electric Cooperative
- Jasper-Newton Electric Cooperative
- Karnes Electric Cooperative
- Lamar County Electric Cooperative Association
- Lamb County Electric Cooperative
- Lea County Electric Cooperative
- Lighthouse Electric Cooperative
- Lower Colorado River Authority
- Lubbock Power and Light
- Luminant
- Lyntegar Electric Cooperative
- Magic Valley Electric Cooperative
- Medina Electric Cooperative
- MidSouth Electric Cooperative
- National Rural Electric Cooperative Association
- Navarro County Electric Cooperative
- Navasota Valley Electric Cooperative
- North Plains Electric Cooperative
- Northeast Texas Electric Cooperative
- NRG Energy includes Reliant Energy, Green Mountain Energy
- Nueces Electric Cooperative
- Oncor Electric Delivery
- Panda Energy International
- Panola-Harrison Electric Cooperative
- Pedernales Electric Cooperative
- Quanta Services
- Rayburn Country Electric Cooperative
- Rio Grande Electric Cooperative
- Rita Blanca Electric Cooperative
- Rusk County Electric Cooperative
- Sam Houston Electric Cooperative
- San Bernard Electric Cooperative
- San Miguel Electric Cooperative
- San Patricio Electric Cooperative
- South Plains Electric Cooperative
- South Texas Electric Cooperative
- Southwest Arkansas Electric Cooperative
- Southwest Rural Electric Association
- Southwest Texas Electric Cooperative
- Swisher Electric Cooperative
- Taylor Electric Cooperative
- Touchstone Energy
- Tri-County Electric Cooperative
- Trinity Valley Electric Cooperative
- United Cooperative Services
- Upshur Rural Electric Cooperative
- Victoria Electric Cooperative
- Vistra Energy (formerly Energy Future Holdings) (includes Luminant and TXU)
- Western Farmers Electric Cooperative
- Wharton County Electric Cooperative
- Wise Electric Cooperative
- Wood County Electric Cooperative

== See also ==
- Electric Reliability Council of Texas
- February 13–16, 2021 North American winter storm
