= J. T. Deely Power Plant =

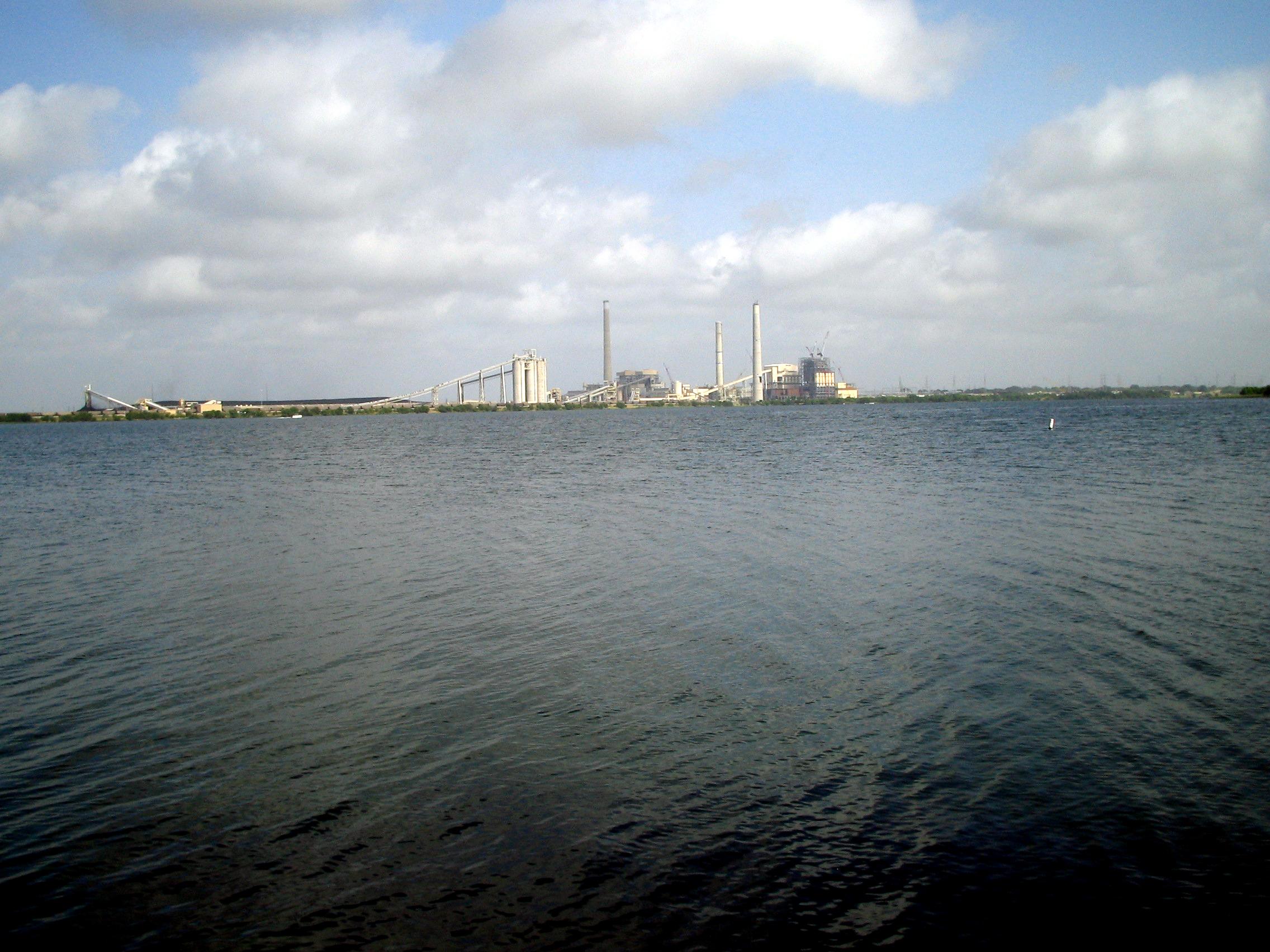
- J.T. Deely Power Plant located at the Calveras Power Station in the center
- Country: United States
- Location: Bexar County, near San Antonio, Texas
- Coordinates: 29°18′27″N 98°19′21″W
- Status: Decommissioned
- Commission date: Unit 1: 1977; Unit 2: 1978
- Decommission date: Units 1–2: December 31, 2018
- Owner: CPS Energy
- Operator: CPS Energy

Thermal power station
- Primary fuel: Coal
- Cooling source: Calaveras Lake

Power generation
- Nameplate capacity: 871 MW

J. T. Deely Power Plant was a two unit, 871 megawatt (MW) coal power plant located southeast of San Antonio, in Bexar County, Texas near Calaveras Lake at the Calaveras Power Station. They were operated by CPS Energy and ran from 1977 to 2018.

== History ==
The plant began commercial generation with Unit 1 in 1977 and Unit 2 in 1978. Deely was constructed as a coal plant due to the economics and unreliability for natural gas at the time. The total cost to construct the two units was $236 million. The construction of Deely included a 700 ft (210 m) smokestack. The plant is named after former CPS General Manager, J. T. Deely. CPS Energy commissioned in 2009 the installation of a selective catalytic reduction (SCR) system to Unit 2 to replace an electrostatic precipitator (ESP).

== Closure ==
In 2011, it was announced that J. T. Deely would be shut down in 2018 due to pending federal regulations. CPS Energy calculated that spending $3 billion to overhaul the plant to comply with environmental regulations outweighed the benefits. CPS Energy reiterated in 2017 that the plant would still close in 2018 even with the changes in environmental policy from the Trump administration. Deely ceased generation on December 31, 2018.

== See also ==
- List of power stations in Texas
