= Lubbock tornado =

1970 F5 tornado in Texas

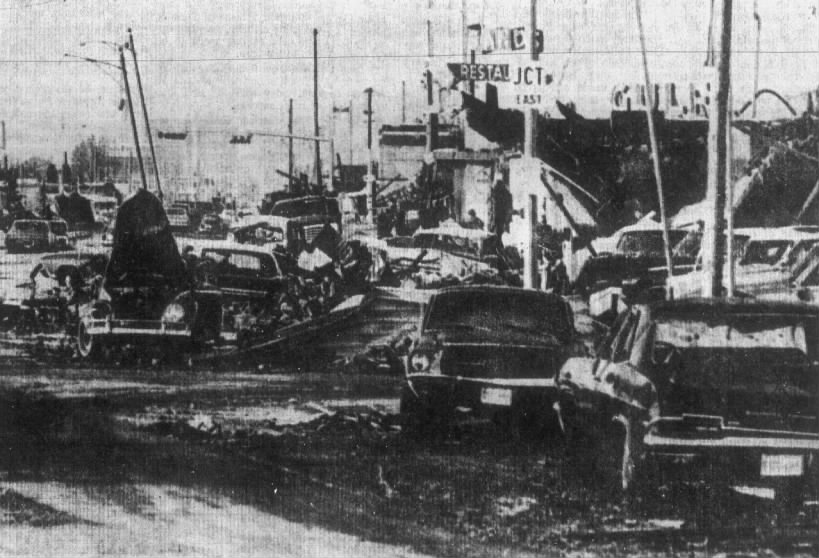
- Damage caused by the tornado near downtown Lubbock

Meteorological history
- Formed: May 11, 1970, 9:35 p.m. CDT (UTC−05:00)
- Dissipated: May 11, 1970, 10:05 p.m. CDT (UTC−05:00)
- Duration: 30 minutes

F5 tornado
- on the Fujita scale
- Path length: 8.5 miles (13.7 km)
- Highest winds: ≥290 mph (470 km/h)

Overall effects
- Fatalities: 26
- Injuries: 1,500+
- Damage: $250 million (1970 USD) $2.07 billion (2025 USD)
- Areas affected: Lubbock, Texas, including the downtown area and the Lubbock Municipal Airport
- Part of the Tornadoes of 1970

During the evening hours of May 11, 1970, an extremely violent multiple-vortex tornado struck a large portion of the city of Lubbock, located in the state of Texas, United States. The incident resulted in 26 fatalities and an estimated $250 million in damage (equivalent to $2.07 billion in 2025). Known as the Lubbock tornado, it was in its time the costliest tornado in U.S. history, damaging nearly 9,000 homes and inflicting widespread damage to businesses, high-rise buildings, and public infrastructure. The tornado's damage was surveyed by meteorologist Ted Fujita in what researcher Thomas P. Grazulis described as "the most detailed mapping ever done, up to that time, of the path of a single tornado." Originally, the most severe damage was assigned a preliminary F6 rating on the Fujita scale, making it one of only two tornadoes to receive the rating, alongside the 1974 Xenia tornado. Later, it was downgraded to an F5 rating. (Note: F5 was the highest rating on the Fujita tornado scale that could be practically achieved, representing "incredible damage". F6 intensity would require winds over 319 mph (513 km/h).) The extremity of the damage and the force required to displace heavy objects as much as was observed indicated that winds produced by vortices within the tornado may have exceeded 290 mph (470 km/h).

Although skies were clear, dry, and sunny in Lubbock during the afternoon of May 11, the westward push of a dry line brought moist air into West Texas, providing suitable conditions for thunderstorm development. After 6:30 p.m., thunderstorms were in progress over the Lubbock area. At least two tornadoes developed prior to the main F5 tornado, including one that tracked across parts of eastern Lubbock near U.S. 87. The primary F5 tornado touched down in southwestern Lubbock at 9:35.00 p.m. and over the next half-hour carved a 8.5-mile (13.7 km) path of devastation encompassing roughly a quarter of the city, with the tornado lifting near the Lubbock Municipal Airport shortly after 10 p.m. The tornado varied in size, spanning 1.5 mi (2.4 km) across when it first touched down before narrowing to around 0.25 mi (0.40 km) by the time it lifted. Severe damage was wrought to high-rises and other buildings in downtown Lubbock, including the 20-story Great Plains Life Building. The tornado briefly moved west and weakened, causing light damage to the campus of Texas Tech University before reintensifying and resuming a northward path. The tornado's most destructive impacts were observed in the Guadalupe barrio, north of 4th Street, along Texas State Highway Loop 289, and near the Lubbock County Club. In those locales, some homes were completely leveled and many others were irreparably damaged. Around 119 aircraft were damaged at the Lubbock airport where the Lubbock office of the United States Weather Bureau was located. As of 2026, this remains the westernmost F5/EF5 tornado recorded in the United States.

== Meteorological synopsis ==
=== Developing storms (before 8 p.m.) ===
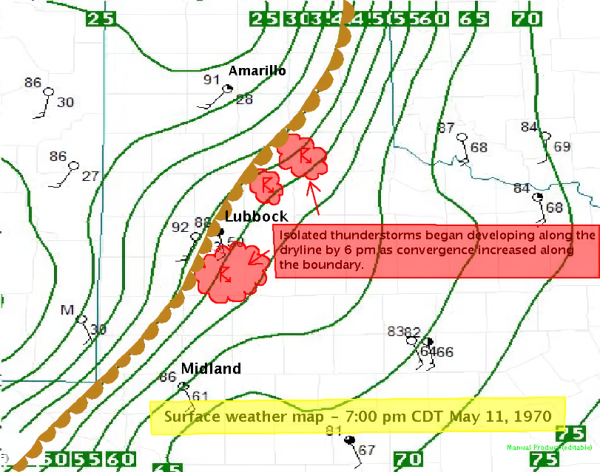
An annotated surface weather analysis of northwestern Texas at 7:00 p.m., showing where storms (shaded in red) developed along the dry line (brown scalloped line).

The Severe Local Storms Unit (SELS) within the National Severe Storms Forecast Center (NSSFC) of the United States Weather Bureau – tasked with issuing daily outlooks projecting possible severe weather over the U.S. – did not initially highlight the possibility of severe weather over West Texas when the agency issued its daily outlook at 4 a.m. (Note: All times are in Central Daylight Time (UTC-05:00) unless otherwise noted.) early on May 11, 1970. Six hours later, the SELS amended the outlook to indicate that "isolated thunderstorms with large hail" were "expected in High Plains of West Texas east of Pecos late afternoon and early evening." The afternoon was warm and dry in Lubbock with the temperature rising above 90 °F (32 °C) and the dew point remaining at around 40 °F (4 °C). As the air mass over the region became increasingly unstable, the forecast agency later advised of the possibility that some of the isolated thunderstorms could become severe. However, the atmospheric conditions aloft were generally unsupportive of a tornado outbreak.

The skies over Lubbock were initially clear on May 11, with the ambient moisture too low to support severe convective storms on its own. However, moist air from the Gulf of Mexico spread north-northwest into the area during the day, providing sufficient buoyancy for convective development. Cumulus clouds began to proliferate over the region by around 4 p.m. and towering cumulus clouds began to develop over West Texas, darkening the skies over Lubbock. The WSR-57 weather radar site in Amarillo, Texas, began detecting radar echoes south of Lubbock at 6:30 p.m. Lubbock radar later picked up on a thunderstorm with a diameter of approximately 10 mi (16 km) forming near Woodrow, Texas, 15 mi (24 km) south of the Lubbock Municipal Airport. Satellite imagery from the ATS-3 satellite showed that the storm emerged about 15–20 mi (24–32 km) behind the leading edge of the advancing mass of moist air originating from the Gulf. Although the westward retreat of this boundary – known as a dry line – would typically coincide with nightfall and a stabilizing of the atmosphere, it did not move far from Lubbock during the evening, maintaining a local area of converging winds and moist rising air supportive of thunderstorm growth. These conducive conditions were also bolstered by the approach of a shortwave trough in the mid-levels of the troposphere, serving as another contributor to rising air. By 7 p.m. the northern fringes of the storm were near the Lubbock city limits. A radiosonde launched from Amarillo concurrently showed that the tropopause had risen by 7,000 ft (2,100 m) to 48,000 ft (15,000 m) over the preceding 12 hours. The Amarillo weather radar also suggested that the thunderstorm's cloud tops were rising to at least 46,000 ft (14,000 m).

Ironically, at the time the storm was developing, the Lubbock Civil Defense was holding a meeting to discuss disaster preparation plans, highlighted by showing the documentary film Tornado! (1966). The Lubbock Tornado itself became the subject of another documentary, Twister, with a subtle emphasis on a bumper sticker: "Lucky Me! I Live in Lubbock!"

With the storm approaching and threatening to become severe, Alan Johnson of the Weather Bureau called Bill Payne, the director of Lubbock Civil Defense, to provide notice of the inclement weather. The emergency operations center (EOC) at the basement of the Lubbock city hall was activated at 7:45 p.m. Following discussion between forecasters at the local Weather Bureau office in Lubbock (Lubbock WBO, located at the Lubbock airport) and the radar operator in Amarillo, a severe thunderstorm warning was issued by the Lubbock WBO for Crosby, Floyd, Lubbock, and Hale counties at 7:50 p.m. with an expiration time set to 9:00 p.m. This warning was disseminated via the Emergency Action Notification Signal and through local radio and television stations such as KFYO. KFYO continuously ran without commercials after this time until 7:30 a.m. on May 14. Despite the increasingly conducive atmospheric conditions for the formation of severe thunderstorms, the NSSFC did not issue a severe thunderstorm watch or tornado watch for the region before storms developed. The Environmental Science Services Administration (ESSA) wrote in a service assessment of the weather event that the lack of such of a watch from the NSSFC demanded "some explanation," but also noted that their absence did not affect the operations of the Lubbock WBO.

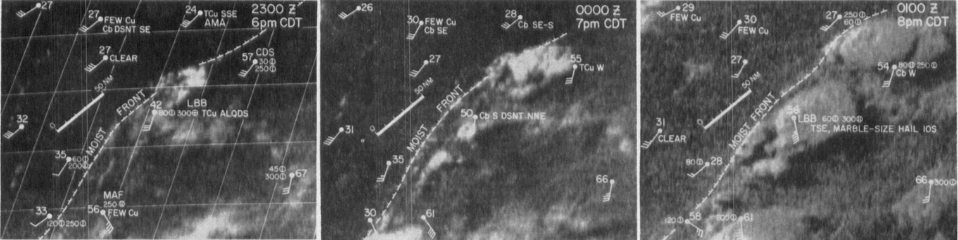
Satellite images taken by ATS-3 of developing storms in the Lubbock area at 6 p.m. (left), 7 p.m. (center), and 8 p.m. (right)

=== Precursor tornadoes develop (8–9 p.m.) ===
Confirmed tornadoes by Fujita rating
FU	F0	F1	F2	F3	F4	F5	Total
0	1	3	0	0	0	1	5

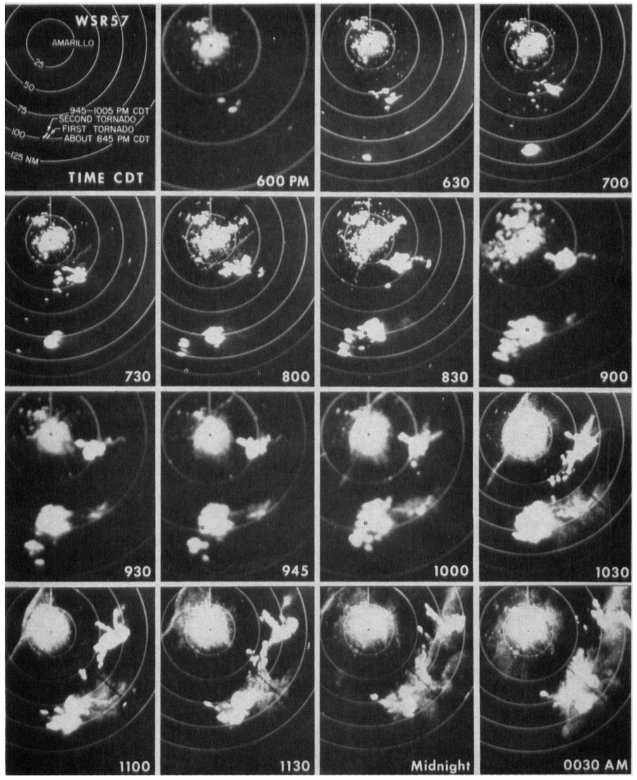
A sequence of radar images produced by the WSR-57 radar site in Amarillo, showing the storms in the Lubbock area while tornadoes were active

Large hail the size of grapefruits were reported in the thunderstorm 5 mi (8.0 km) south of Lubbock at around 8 p.m., with baseball-sized hail reaching southeastern Lubbock by 8:13 p.m. Severe Weather Statements were transmitted by the Lubbock WBO over the Weather Wire Service to relay the hail reports as the storm neared Lubbock. Radar data indicated that the thunderstorm's cloud tops had increased to 55,000 ft (17,000 m) by 8:10 p.m. At around the same time, an off-duty policeman reported a funnel cloud 7 mi (11 km) southeast of the Lubbock airport and 3 mi (4.8 km) east of the city limits. This, along with the detection of a hook echo on radar, prompted the Lubbock Weather Bureau office to issue a tornado warning for Crosby, eastern Floyd, western Hale, and Lubbock counties at 8:15 p.m. with an expiration time of 9:00 p.m. At 8:30 p.m., a tornado – the first of two to strike the Lubbock area – touched down near the intersection of Broadway and Quint Avenue in eastern Lubbock. Described by tornado researcher Ted Fujita as a "small forerunner" to the main Lubbock tornado, this first tornado produced a damage path roughly 2 mi (3.2 km) across and caused structural damage indicative of wind gusts reaching around 75 mph (121 km/h). The most severe damage occurred near the interchange between U.S. 82 and Parkway Drive, which was under construction at the time. There, 13 concrete beams weighing 109,000 lb (49,000 kg) each and doubly weighted with chains were blown down from a partially-built overpass by the tornado.

At 8:40 p.m., the NSSFC issued a severe thunderstorm watch for the entirety of the Southern Plains. Concurrently, two thunderstorms quickly developed 8 mi (13 km) southwest of the Lubbock airport and moved northeast at 25 mph (40 km/h); their formation was noted on a Severe Weather Statement issued by the Lubbock WBO at 8:42 p.m. At 8:59 p.m., the office issued a bulletin that extended the preexisting tornado warning to 10 p.m. The bulletin also advised people to prepare to seek shelter with radar imagery and reports continuing to indicate that a tornado was in progress roughly 7 mi (11 km) south-southeast of the Lubbock airport. At around 9:00 p.m., a separate tornado – listed as an F1 tornado in the National Centers for Environmental Information's Storm Events database – unroofed a barn approximately 8 mi (13 km) north of Crosbyton, shearing the sheet metal roof over a nearby pasture.

TORNADO WARNING REMAINS IN EFFECT FOR LUBBOCK...WESTERN CROSBY...FLOYD...AND SOUTHERN HALE COUNTIES UNTIL 10 PM TONIGHT...SEVERE THUNDERSTORMS WITH LARGE HAIL...DAMAGING WINDS AND POSSIBLY A TORNADO IN THESE AREAS UNTIL 10 PM...RADAR STILL INDICATES GOOD HOOK FORMATION ABOUT 6 MILES SOUTH SOUTHEAST OF THE LUBBOCK AIRPORT...AND THIS LOCATION WOULD BE ON THE BUFFALO SPRINGS LAKE ROAD ABOUT 3 MILES EAST OF THE CITY OF LUBBOCK...IDALOU SHOULD BE ON THE ALERT IN PARTICULAR FOR THIS SEVERE STORM AND POSSIBLE TORNADO...

— excerpt of message transmitted on the ESSA Weather Wire Service by the Lubbock WBO at 9 p.m.

== Tornado summary ==
Large hail continued to fall throughout Lubbock, with reports indicating hail the size of golf balls and baseballs. After around 9 p.m., the radar echoes associated with the storms in the Lubbock area began to congeal, resulting in a singular, larger echo. This coalescence had been previously observed in connection with tornadogenesis. By 9:14 p.m., the severe thunderstorm was 10–15 mi (16–24 km) in diameter based on radar data. At 9:35 p.m., the main Lubbock tornado, much larger and more destructive than the previous tornadoes, touched down near the intersection of 19th Street and University Avenue and began to track towards the north-northeast. The WSR-1 radar site in Lubbock simultaneously observed a hook echo in the thunderstorm coincident with the newly formed tornado. This prompted the Lubbock WBO to alert the Lubbock Civil Defense EOC, which, in combination with a spotter report of a funnel cloud in the area, resulted in the activation of tornado warning sirens. However, the tornado's winds had already severed the power lines that serviced many of the sirens, rendering them inoperable and causing their failure to activate. Although police cruisers also sounded their sirens to alert those nearby of the imminent tornado, many ultimately did not hear either signal and thus likely received no warning.

Communications were brought down as the tornado tore through Lubbock and triggered widespread power outages. At 9:43 p.m., Bud Andrews, the radio announcer on KFYO, directed listeners to take shelter shortly before the AM station stopped transmitting. The Lubbock Civil Defense headquarters lost commercial power and communications at 9:46 p.m. with the exception of a single telephone line. The Lubbock WBO was able to reach the EOC at 9:47 p.m. to relay that the hook echo observed on radar was in the vicinity of 4th Street and Avenue U. This was the last communication transmitted by the Lubbock WBO as all communications went offline at 9:49 p.m. The WSR-1 radar also went offline around the same time following the downing of its emergency generator. The personnel at the office abandoned their post and took shelter at 9:55 p.m. shortly before the tornado passed over the Lubbock WBO. With the Lubbock WBO no longer fully operational, dissemination of subsequent tornado warnings were carried out by the agency using the VHF-FM radio of the Lubbock Fire Department; this was ultimately the only line of communication between the Lubbock WBO and the surrounding area and allowed tornado warnings to be communicated to the Abernathy, New Deal, and Petersburg areas at 10:10 p.m. Wind gusts at the nearby airport reached 77 kn (89 mph; 143 km/h) at 10:03 p.m., likely coinciding with the tornado's passage over the airport and the Weather Bureau office. The tornado lifted near the airport shortly thereafter. All weather warnings were called off by the Lubbock WBO at 11:30 p.m. once thunderstorms had lessened to a more moderate intensity around Lorenzo, Texas.

== Impact ==
The primary Lubbock tornado – the second of two tornadoes that struck the city on May 11 – produced a damage path 8.5 mi (13.7 km) long and extending across 15 mi^{2} (39 km^{2}) of ground, beginning at 9:35 p.m. in southwestern Lubbock, tracking through downtown Lubbock, and lifting shortly after 10 p.m. near the Lubbock Municipal Airport This damage path covered nearly a quarter of the city. The tornado was 1.5 mi (2.4 km) wide when it formed and when it tracked through downtown, tying it with the 1947 Glazier–Higgins tornados as the widest tornado recorded in Texas history. The tornado narrowed as it tracked northeast, reaching a width of 0.25 mi (0.40 km) when it impacted the Lubbock airport. It was the second tornado in Texas history to strike the downtown area of a city of comparable size, with the first being the 1953 Waco tornado, (Note: Lubbock had a population of roughly 150,000 people in 1970.) and one of the most destructive to hit any U.S. city. As the tornado struck after nightfall, no photographs were taken of the tornado.

There were 26 fatalities and numerous injuries, with estimates of the lower-bound on the number of casualties ranging from 500 to as high as 2,000. Approximately 1,500 people were treated for injuries and 96 people were hospitalized, with many of the injuries caused by broken glass in the downtown area. Estimates of the tornado's damage toll vary: the National Weather Service (NWS) forecast office in Lubbock and the National Centers for Environmental Information Storm Events Database lists the tornado as having caused $250 million (equivalent to $2.07 billion in 2025) in damage. The May 1970 edition of Storm Data initially estimated a $135 million (equivalent to $1.12 billion in 2025) property damage toll. Nonetheless, the lower estimate made the Lubbock tornado the costliest tornado in Texas history. It also became the costliest tornado in U.S. history, incurring more damage than the tornado that struck Topeka, Kansas, on June 8, 1966; the Lubbock tornado's toll was later surpassed by a tornado that struck Omaha, Nebraska, in 1975. According to the National Weather Service, 8,800 homes were damaged, of which 430 were destroyed. The American Red Cross enumerated damage to 1,713 single family homes, of which 460 were destroyed. Additionally, 600 apartment units were destroyed and 250 businesses were damaged or destroyed. Ten thousand vehicles were also damaged or destroyed; some cars were compacted to a height of 2–3 ft (0.61–0.91 m) above the ground. Damage to private vehicles reached approximately $3 million (equivalent to $24.9 million in 2025). Estacado High School, Thompson Junior High School, and eight elementary schools (Arnett, Jackson, Hunt, K. Carter, McWhorter, North Avenue U, and Sanders) were damaged. The tornado also caused extensive power outages and disruptions to communications, knocking out service to 25,000 telephones. Large trees were also uprooted throughout the damage swath.

The severity of damage along the tornado's path varied considerably, a phenomenon the National Bureau of Standards (NBS) ascribed to both the varied structural integrity of the buildings impacted and the varied wind patterns generated by the tornado. In some areas, homes with minor shingle damage remained standing next to homes with total loss of their roofs. While an NBS investigation concluded that two tornadoes touched down east of Texas Tech University before merging into a single tornado north of downtown, analysis of the tornado damage conducted by Ted Fujita deduced there was a singular multiple-vortex tornado composed of smaller vortices that produced smaller areas of serious damage; 25 of the 26 fatalities occurred in the paths of these smaller vortices. Fujita's analysis of these vortices, which he termed "section spots", suggested that rotational winds of 145–290 mph (233–467 km/h) were produced by the tornado. Two homes in the path of one of these small vortices were pulverized, with the remaining debris carried 200 ft (61 m) away onto a field. One empty fertilizer tank weighing 16 short tons (15 t) was displaced 890 m (2,920 ft), with the tank likely remaining airbone for 700 m (2,300 ft), being lofted by a tornadic vortex above US-87 before rolling to its final position. When Fujita proposed his eponymous scale for rating tornado damage in 1971, he rated the most severe damage from Lubbock as F5, the highest practical rating on the scale. John A. Shanahan of Stone & Webster analyzed several instances of severe damage produced by the tornado, finding that horizontal winds may have ranged between 150–250 mph (240–400 km/h). Supporting evidence for winds of such strength included a steel tank weighing 37,570 lb (17,040 kg) being displaced 2,700 ft (820 m) from its initial supporting structure.

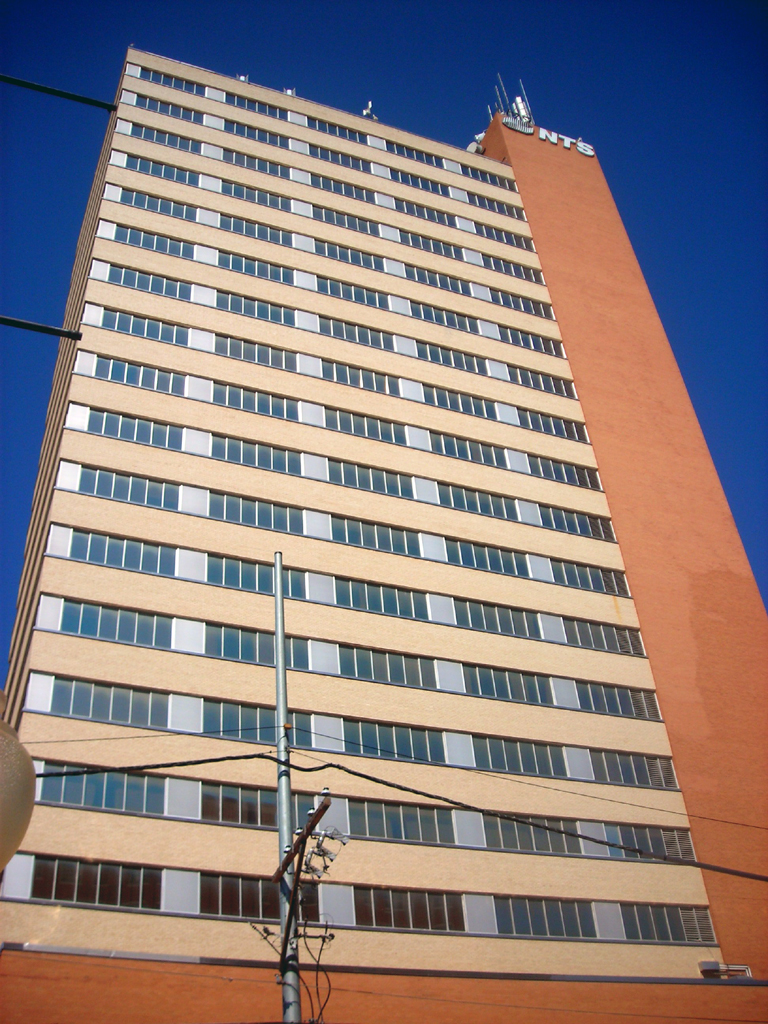
Damage remained visible on the Metro Tower (formerly the Great Plains Life Building) in downtown Lubbock (pictured in 2011, note different coloring of brick at bottom-right).

Downtown Lubbock was heavily impacted by the tornado, with skyscrapers and buildings subjected to the tornado's violent winds. The tornado also narrowed during its traversal of downtown to a diameter of roughly 0.4 mi (0.64 km), producing in a corresponding increase of winds around the tornado. Eighty percent of the plate glass windows in the downtown district were shattered. The tornado's periphery struck the 20-story Great Plains Life Building (now known as the NTS Building), distorting the building's frame counter-clockwise and disabling three of the building's four elevators. The torsion of the entire building resulted in severe cracks in the building's stairwells and on the fire protection surrounding steel columns within the tower. Brick was also stripped from the building and windows were blown out by the atmospheric pressure differences induced by the tornado. Interior pressure buildup fractured loadbearing columns and lofted ceilings. As the center of the tornado remained 0.5 mi (0.80 km) northwest of the skyscraper, the building likely avoided more extreme damage; the damage toll nonetheless reached around $2 million (equivalent to $16.6 million in 2025). There were around 30 people in the building when the tornado hit; they took shelter in the lobby as the tornado passed nearby.

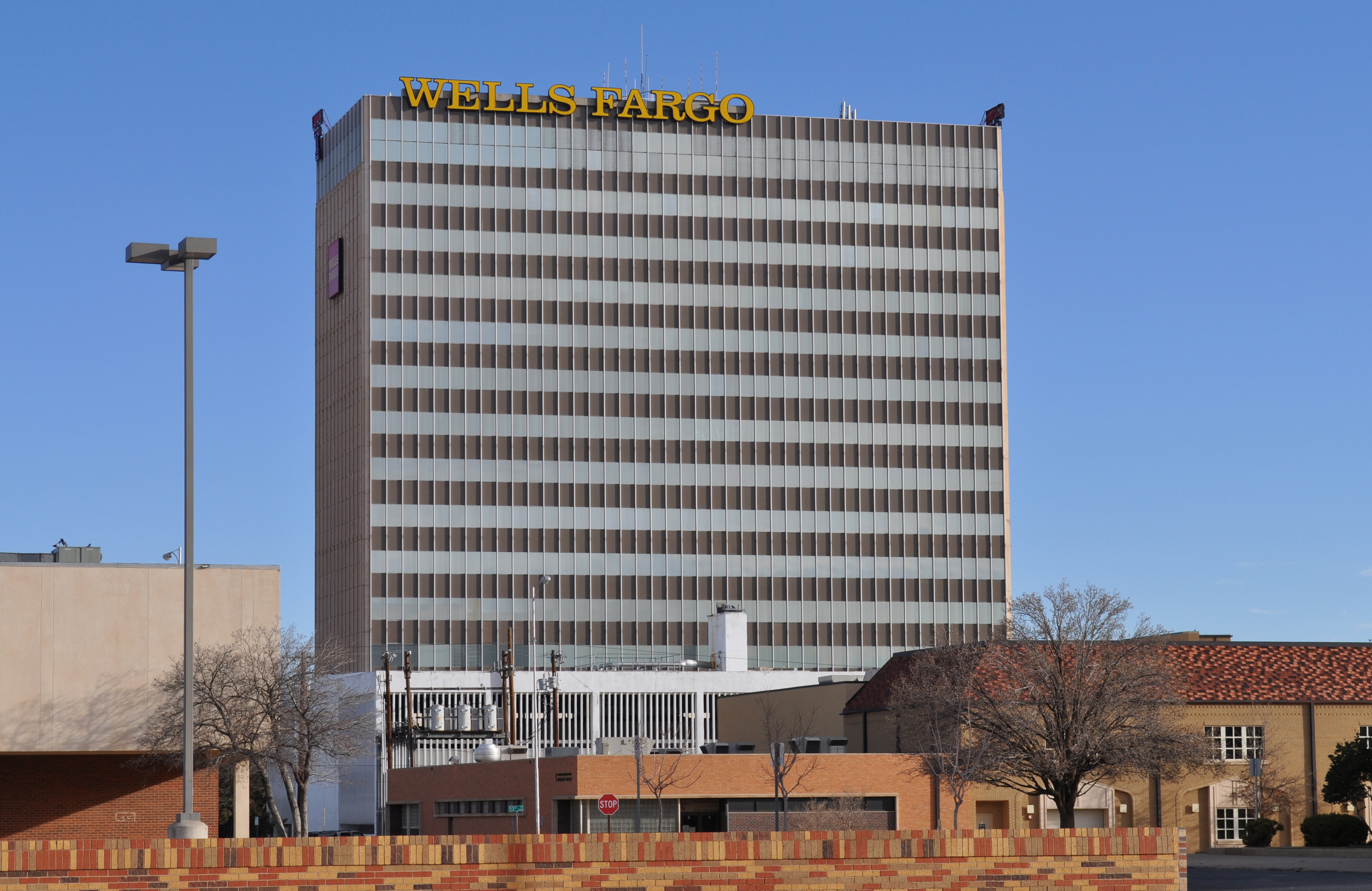
The Wells Fargo Building (formerly the First National Bank–Pioneer Natural Gas Building) sustained significant damage to its façades (pictured in 2014).

The predominantly glass north and southern façades of the 15-story First National Bank–Pioneer Natural Gas Building (now the Wells Fargo Building) were largely destroyed. The marble veneer of the building's eastern and western ends were ripped from their copper wire anchor. Strong winds penetrated the buildings interior, damaging suspended ceilings. Total damage to the building amounted to around $1 million (equivalent to $8.3 million in 2025). Signs were ripped from the roof of the Lubbock National Bank Building while the Citizens National Bank Building and Lubbock County Courthouse sustained primarily minor window damage. The two-story plate glass windows on the eastern side of the Lubbock City Hall were shattered, leading to the collapse of some interior walls; overall the city hall sustained moderate damage. Federal government buildings in downtown Lubbock avoided significant damage, with occupied and operational buildings collectively sustaining only around $2,000 in damage. However, $150,000-worth of construction materials were damaged at the site of the eight-story Federal Office Building, which was under construction at the time.

Several churches were damaged: the Broadway Church of Christ lost roof tiles and window panes and the roof of the Cumberland Presbyterian Church collapsed. The publishing facilities of the Lubbock Avalanche-Journal were crippled by the tornado. The roof of the Central Fire Station collapsed, smashing the fire trucks below. One dispatcher on duty was struck by shards of flying glass and lost an eye. One Greyhound bus was hurled onto a downtown building by the tornado. The steel frames of the two buildings at Newson's Living Center were contorted by the tornado; one of the buildings was destroyed while the other sustained heavy damage on its topmost, second story.

The tornado curved west its initial traversal of downtown Lubbock and weakened markedly, with the swaths of intense damage caused by the tornado's smaller vortices becoming less apparent. One of the light towers at the Jones Stadium on the campus of Texas Tech was destroyed while three others on the stadium's eastern side were bent by the tornado's winds. The stadium itself sustained light damage; this was the extent of the tornadic damage on the university's campus. After the tornado reached the intersection of University Avenue and 4th Street, it looped eastward and intensified, becoming increasingly destructive. Student housing in the Overton area of Lubbock was particularly hard-hit, with the severity of damage requiring demolition of the remaining structures. The University Arms apartments on 5th Street and University Avenue sustained moderately damage. The Arnett Benson subdivision sustained significant damage and roofs were damaged and tree limbs were torn near the Clovis Highway. The Brookshire Inn was seriously damaged.

Industrial buildings were hard-hit by the tornado, including several warehouses. Buildings with large segments of exposed and unsupported roofs suffered greatly, experiencing heavy damage or total destruction. Five of the cylindrical grain bins at the Goodpasture Inc. grain elevator, each covered by 10-inch (25 cm) thick and steel-reinforced concrete, were blown open by the tornado. Damage to public facilities amounted to roughly $10 million (equivalent to $82.9 million in 2025). Both the Lubbock Power and Light (LP&L) No. 1 power plant near downtown and the LP&L No. 2 power plant on Municipal Hill were knocked out by the tornado.

After clearing the downtown area, the tornado tracked northeast along U.S. Highway 87. Significant residential damage was concentrated north of 4th Street. Apartment complexes along the northern side of 4th Street near Indiana Avenue were unroofed. The motels on Avenue Q North Drive (the Amarillo Highway) were destroyed, while all motels lining 4th Street and Avenue Q north of 10th street were seriously damaged. The Lubbock City-County Health Department headquarters on Avenue Q were destroyed. A Ramada Inn adjacent to US-87 was directly in the path of the center of the tornado and was bombarded by quickly-moving debris, resulting in loss of the motel's brick veneer; the motel's carport was lofted 40 ft (12 m) northward. At two mobile home parks north of downtown, some homes were blown off of their chassis, overturned, and crushed by the tornado; 80 mobile homes in total were destroyed, with another 30 taking severe damage. It was the second tornado strike in two years for one of the mobile home parks; many of the complex's residents took shelter in the basement of a nearby house. The most severe residential damage was wrought in the Guadalupe neighborhood, between Avenues A and Q north of 4th Street, along the northern part of Loop 289, and in the Lubbock Country Club west of the Amarillo Highway. The tornado inflicted considerable damage to homes near the Lubbock Country Club. Some homes disintegrated and others were fully unroofed. Without basements or storm shelters, many residents sought shelter beneath mattresses in their homes. Nearby trees were denuded of their leaves and debris in the area was numerous. The tornado then tracked across the Lubbock Municipal Airport, damaging hangars and buildings. Aircraft were strewn by the powerful winds across the airport tarmac. Roughly 100 private airplanes were destroyed by the tornado both within and outside the hangars, with another 19 small military aircraft irreparably damaged. The rim of the funnel cloud, at the time measuring between 0.3–0.4 mi (0.48–0.64 km) in diameter, came as close as 0.75 mi (1.21 km) to the Lubbock WBO, with the office's anomemometer registering a peak gust of 77 kn (89 mph; 143 km/h).

== Aftermath ==
Twenty-six people were killed in the tornado or died due to injuries received during the storm.

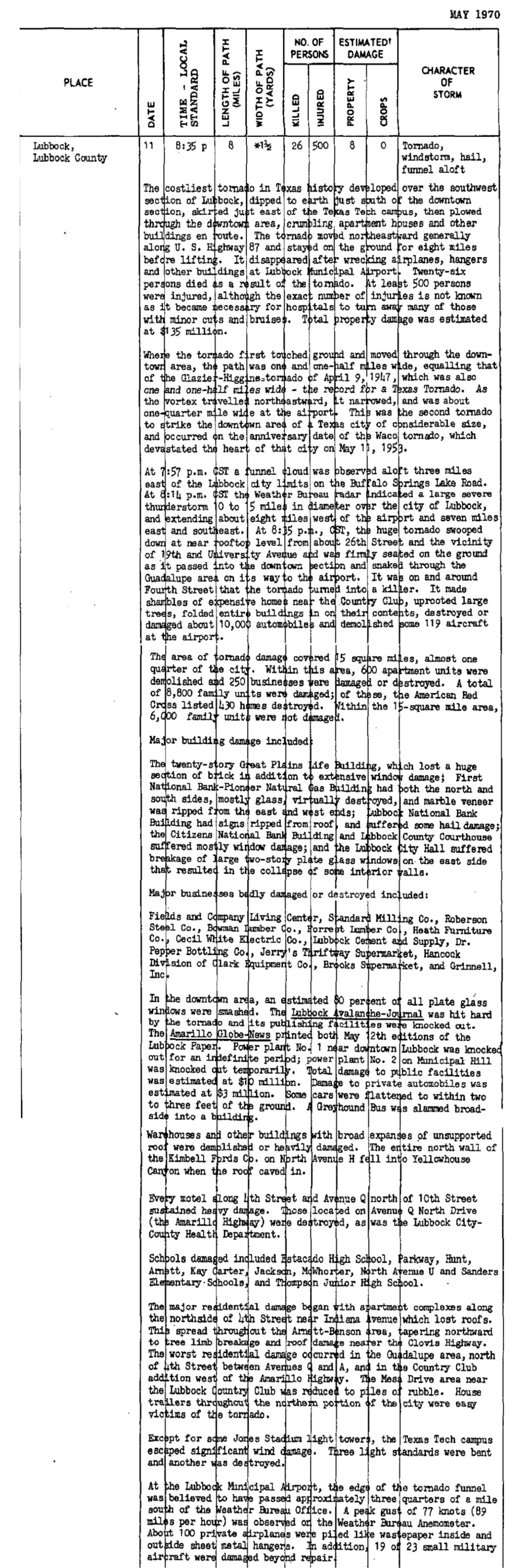
The Environmental Science Services Administration damage survey for the violent tornado.

Hospitals turned away people with minor injuries due to the sheer number of casualties inflicted by the tornado. With its water pumps rendered inoperable, the city relied on external sources of water including the Pearl Brewing Company in San Antonio. After the storm, Mayor Jim Granberry imposed a curfew, and Police Chief J.T. Alley issued orders that looters would be shot on sight. No looting was reported throughout the ordeal. The city council was directed to lead the rebuilding process, which continued under Granberry's successor, Morris W. Turner. The Lubbock Tornado also served as a model for the development of the Fujita scale, developed a year later. Bud Andrews and Ernesto Barton, Lubbock radio broadcasters, were given Presidential Citations from then U.S. President Richard M. Nixon for coverage of the disaster.

Despite the destruction wrought by the tornado, the recovery effort revitalized the stagnating Lubbock economy and helped to bring about a period of sustained economic and physical growth. Numerous buildings throughout Lubbock were damaged beyond repair and were demolished after the tornado. This included the northwestern section of downtown, whose demolition made way for the construction of the Lubbock Memorial Civic Center and the George and Helen Mahon Public Library; civic leaders had lobbied for a civic center and other public development of downtown in years prior and used the redevelopment of downtown to make these visions a reality. New hotels and restaurants were constructed along the largely devastated east side of Avenue Q. The residents of the predominantly Hispanic neighborhood of Guadalupe moved to primarily the southern and western portions of Lubbock. The Lubbock Urban Renewal Agency rebuilt the largely destroyed Guadalupe neighborhood, though progress was slow for many years before substantial reconstruction occurred.

The damage path of the Lubbock tornado was the subject of a detailed mapping carried out by Ted Fujita. Researcher Thomas P. Grazulis described this mapping as the "most detailed mapping ever done, up to that time, of the path of a single tornado," becoming a seminal work in understanding the relationship between tornado subvortices and extreme damage. The degrees of damage wrought by the tornado also became the basis for the six tiers of the Fujita tornado scale, which served as the standard for classifying tornadoes until it was superseded by the Enhanced Fujita Scale in 2007.

Fifty years after the disaster, the Lubbock Tornado Memorial Gateway Park was opened at Ave Q and Glenna Goodacre Blvd in downtown Lubbock: a spot along the destructive path of the larger tornado.The memorial includes two flowing black granite-clad walls representing the two paths of the tornadoes. There are also artistically bent street lights representing the power of the tornadoes, and one relic from the destruction: a snapped-off utility pole. The walls are engraved with timelines of the tornado events, a map of the destructive paths overlaid on a street map of the city at the time, and location references on the map indexed to the individual names and ages of the 26 victims who died as a result of the second tornado. There are also quotes from survivors and other details.

== See also ==
- List of North American tornadoes and tornado outbreaks
- List of tornadoes striking downtown areas
- Disagreements on the intensity of tornadoes

== Notes ==
Preceded by Topeka, Kansas (1966)	Costliest U.S. tornadoes on record May 11, 1970	Succeeded by Omaha, Nebraska (1975)
