= CPS Energy =

Municipal electric utility in San Antonio, Texas, U.S.

- Company type: Municipal corporation
- Industry: Energy
- Founded: 1942
- Headquarters: San Antonio, Texas, US
- Key people: Rudy Garza, President & CEO
- Products: Electricity and natural gas
- Revenue: ▲US$2.5 billion (2016)
- Number of employees: 3,628 (2025)
- Website: cpsenergy.com

CPS Energy (formerly City Public Service Board of San Antonio) is the municipal electric utility serving the city of San Antonio, Texas. Acquired by the city in 1942, CPS Energy serves over 840,750 electricity customers and more than 352,585 natural gas customers in its 1,566-square-mile (4,060 km^{2}) service area, which includes Bexar County and portions of its 7 surrounding counties.

== History ==
- 1917 – San Antonio Public Service Company formed; consolidation of San Antonio Traction Company and San Antonio Gas and Electric Company, owned by American Light and Traction
- 1942 – City purchases SAPSCo for $34 million It became known as City Public Service.
- 2005 – City Public Service (or simply CPS) officially rebrands to CPS Energy.
- 2010 – J.K. Spruce 2, a coal-fired power plant, begins operation
- 2012 – Acquires Rio Nogales, a combined-cycle natural gas plant in Seguin
- 2017 – CPS Energy celebrated 75 years of being owned by the City of San Antonio.
- 2018 – CPS Energy decommissioned J.T. Deely #1 and #2 Coal fired power plants in late December, ending 42 years of service.

== Generation sources ==
As of May 2015, CPS Energy had 1,059 megawatts of wind and 444 megawatts of solar power under contract.

Plant Name	Type	Rated Capacity	Year Completed	Cost	Notes
Blue Wing Solar Project	Solar-PV	14.4 MW	2010		Partner with Duke Energy
South Texas Project Unit 1	Nuclear	1250 MW	1987	$2.25 Billion	40% Owner with NRG Energy and City of Austin
South Texas Project Unit 2	Nuclear	1250 MW	1988	$2.25 Billion	40% Owner with NRG Energy and City of Austin
J.K. Spruce Power Plant Unit 1	Coal-Fired	556 MW	1992		At Calaveras Lake
J.K. Spruce Power Plant Unit 2	Coal-Fired	780 MW	2010	$1 Billion	At Calaveras Lake; design capacity was 750 MW, Analysis revealed capable of 780 MW
O. W. Sommers	Natural Gas	892 MW	1972		At Calaveras Lake
Leon Creek Power Plant	Natural gas	417 MW	1949		First unit began operation in 1949
Desert Sky Wind Farm	Wind	160.5 MW	2001		Owned by American Electric Power, but CPS buys all the power.
Rio Nogales	Natural gas	800 MW	2002		Located in Seguin, Texas. Purchased in 2012 to replace 871 MW two-unit coal-fired J.T. Deely.
Braunig Power Station	Natural gas	1138 MW	1966		Located at Victor Braunig Lake

Former: J.T. Deely Power Plant Unit 1, 486 MW, 1977–2018, coal, decommissioned. J.T. Deely Power Plant Unit 2, 446 MW, 1978–2018, coal, decommissioned. W.B. Tuttle power plant, 425 MW, 1954–2011, natural gas, demolished. and Comal Power Plant, 70 MW, 1925–1973, coal then natural gas, redeveloped.

== Governing structure ==
CPS Energy is governed by a five-member board of trustees. The mayor of San Antonio serves as an ex officio member, for as long as they are the mayor. Each of the other four members represents a geographical quadrant within the city, and must reside within that quadrant. They are nominated by the remaining trustees for a five-year term, with eligibility to serve one additional term. The nominations must be approved by majority vote of the San Antonio City Council.

In addition, a 15-member Citizens Advisory Committee serves as a liaison between CPS Energy and the citizens of San Antonio. Ten of the members are nominated by the ten City Council members (one from each district), while the remaining five are chosen from applicants who are interviewed by the Board. The Board approves all fifteen members, who must reside in the CPS Energy service territory and be customers of CPS Energy as well.

== See also ==
- Public service company
