= Austan Librach =

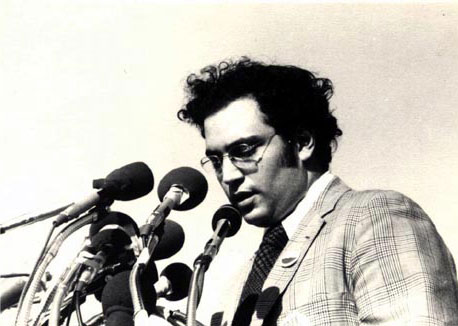
Austan Librach, speaking to a crowd of an estimated 40-60,000 at the first Earth Day in 1970 in Fairmount Park, Philadelphia.

Austan Librach was Chairman of the Earth Week Committee of Philadelphia during the first Earth Day in 1970. The Committee was a group of 33 students, professionals, leaders of grass roots organizations and businessmen concerned about the environment whose common objective was to raise public awareness of environmental problems and their potential solutions. Austan's group was joined in 1970 by students from other area colleges, as well as from other community, church and business groups which, working together, organized scores of educational activities, scientific symposia and major mass media events in the Delaware Valley Region in and around Philadelphia.

Librach joined the City of Austin in 1986 and to spearhead programs for environmental protection, transportation, and resource conservation. He then became Director of Emerging Transportation Technologies for Austin Energy, heading Plug-in Partners, a national campaign designed to encourage the adoption of plug-in hybrid electric vehicles by automakers.
