= Amazon Wind Farm =

Amazon Wind Farm may refer to:

- Amazon Wind Farm Texas, a 253 megawatt wind farm owned by Lincoln Clean Energy in Scurry County, Texas.
- Amazon Wind Farm US East, a 208 megawatt wind farm owned by Iberdrola Renewables in Perquimans and Pasquotank County, North Carolina.
- Amazon Wind Farm Fowler Ridge, a 150 megawatt wind farm owned by Pattern Energy in Benton County, Indiana.
- Amazon Wind Farm Timber Road, a 100 megawatt wind farm owned by EDP Renewables North America in Paulding County, Ohio.
