= Wilkes Power Plant =

Frank M. Wilkes Power Plant
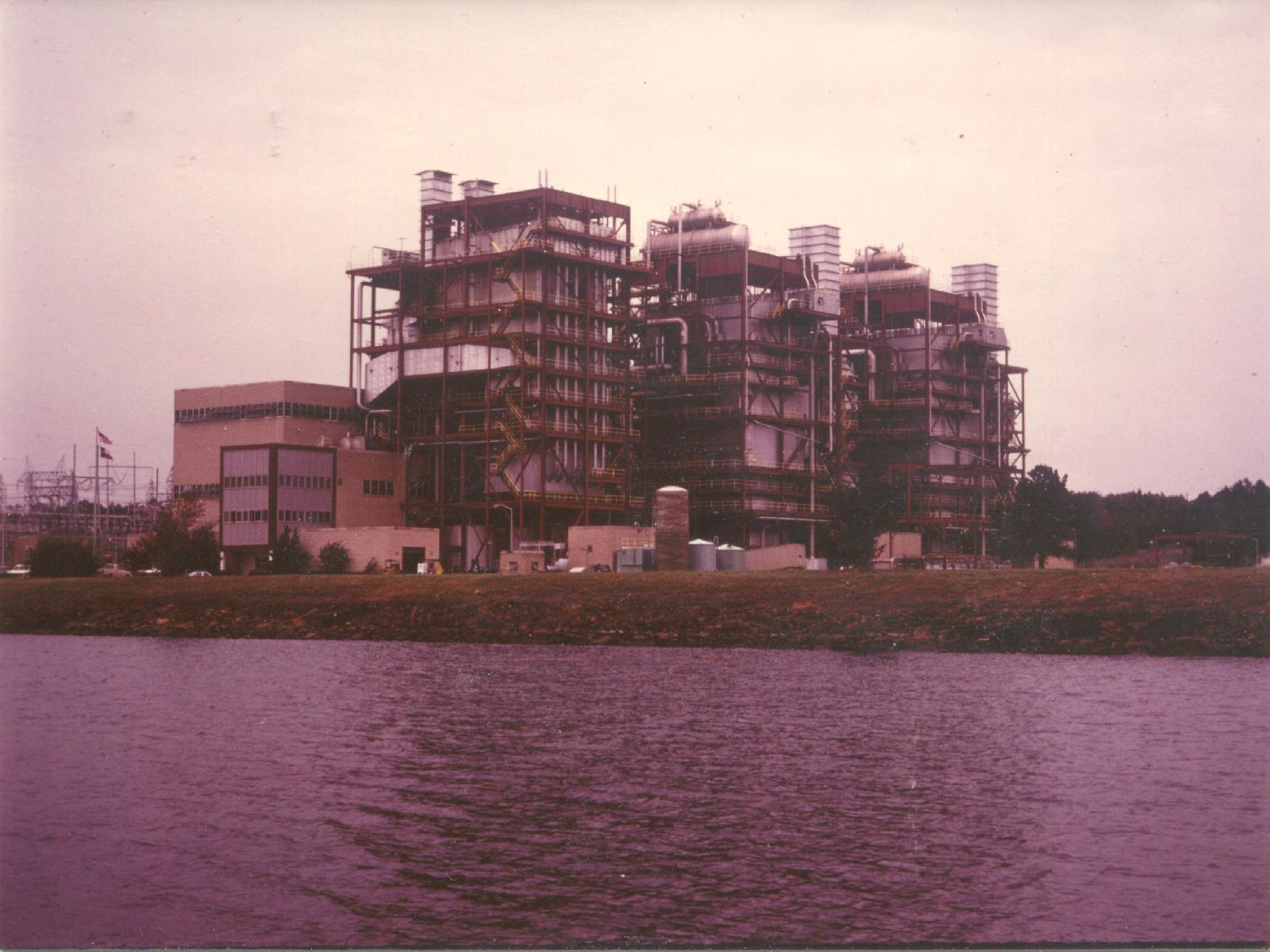
- Frank M. Wilkes Power Plant
- Country: United States
- Location: Marion County, near Avinger, Texas
- Coordinates: 32°50′53″N 94°32′52″W
- Status: Operational
- Commission date: 1964
- Owner: SWEPCO/American Electric Power (AEP)

Thermal power station
- Primary fuel: Natural gas
- Cooling source: Johnson Creek Reservoir

Power generation
- Units operational: 3
- Nameplate capacity: 879 MW

Frank M. Wilkes Power Plant is an 879 megawatt (MW), natural gas power plant located northwest of Jefferson, Texas in Marion County, Texas. The plant began operations in 1964.

All three units use natural gas shipped via pipeline. The power plant is named after former Southwestern Electric Power Company (SWEPCO) president Frank M. Wilkes.

== Units ==
Unit	Capacity	Commissioning	Notes
1	177 MW (natural gas)	1964	CE (Combustion Engineering Boiler tilt tangential firing) and GE turbine/generator
2	351 MW (natural gas)	1970	B&W (Babcock & Wilcox Boiler) and GE turbine/generator
3	351 MW (natural gas)	1971	B&W (Babcock & Wilcox Boiler) and GE turbine/generator

== See also ==
- List of power stations in Texas
