= Forney Energy Center =

- Country: United States
- Location: Forney, Texas
- Coordinates: 32.7629°N 96.4833°W
- Status: Operational
- Commission date: 2003
- Owner: Luminant

Thermal power station
- Primary fuel: Natural gas
- Cooling source: Recycled wastewater
- Combined cycle?: Yes

Power generation
- Nameplate capacity: 1,824 MW

The Forney Energy Center is a natural gas-fired power station located in Forney, Texas. The energy center was commissioned in 2003 and features six 304 MW combined-cycle generators. It is the second largest natural gas-fired power station in Texas after the Sabine Power Plant.

== See also ==
- List of power stations in Texas
- List of largest power stations in the United States
