= Roserock Solar =

Photovoltaic power station in Pecos County, Texas, USA

Roserock Solar Facility
- Country: United States
- Location: Pecos County, Texas
- Coordinates: 30°57′37″N 103°18′24″W
- Status: Operational
- Commission date: December, 2016
- Construction cost: $275 million
- Owners: Southern Company and Recurrent Energy

Solar farm
- Type: Flat-panel PV single-axis tracking
- Site area: 1,300 acres (5.26 km^{2})

Power generation
- Make and model: 700,000 CS6X-P modules
- Nameplate capacity: 212 MW_{p}, 157 MW_{AC}
- Capacity factor: 26.3% (average 2017-2020)
- Annual net output: 362 GW·h, 279 MW·h/acre

The Roserock Solar Facility is a 157 MW_{AC} (212 MW_{p}) photovoltaic power station in Pecos County, Texas. It was the largest solar project in Texas when completed in late 2016. The facility is dispersed over about 1300 acres of land already developed for oil and gas by Apache Corporation. It is located about a mile north of Interstate-10, and 20 miles west of Fort Stockton.

== Facility details ==
The project was developed by Recurrent Energy, which was acquired by the Sharp Corporation in late 2010. Recurrent Energy was subsequently acquired by the Chinese photovoltaic panel manufacturer Canadian Solar in February 2015. Construction on the project was financed for about $275 million and began in November 2015. The engineering, procurement, and construction contractor was McCarthy Building Companies and the project employed about 480 workers at its peak.

The project uses approximately 700,000 CS6X-P series panels (polycrystalline, ~300 W_{p} each) from Canadian Solar that are mounted on single-axis trackers. It began sending electricity to the grid in late November 2016. On November 30, 2016, Recurrent Energy sold a controlling interest in the completed facility to Southern Power. The electricity is being sold to Austin Energy under a 20-year power purchase agreement.

== Electricity production ==
Generation (MW·h) of Roserock Solar
Year	Jan	Feb	Mar	Apr	May	Jun	Jul	Aug	Sep	Oct	Nov	Dec	Total
2016											6,495	20,330	26,825
2017	27,371	29,280	39,767	37,916	41,442	37,496	41,301	36,702	31,019	31,132	21,145	20,819	396,390
2018	26,479	25,710	30,535	24,286	11,749	18,368	20,462	15,301	18,013	19,464	23,807	18,111	252,285
2019	21,152	22,587	18,011	41,151	39,988	43,455	44,443	42,477	32,021	32,217	22,378	25,070	384,950
2020	24,349	23,972	28,614	40,464	44,650	46,173	46,813	43,101	33,048	32,889	27,796	22,709	414,578
2021	25,975	22,362											
Average Annual Production (years 2017–2020) --->													362,051

== See also ==
- Solar power in Texas
- List of photovoltaic power stations
