= Blue Wing Solar Project =

Solar power plant in San Antonio, Texas, USA

- Country: United States
- Location: San Antonio, Texas
- Coordinates: 29°18′25″N 98°24′15″W
- Status: Operational
- Commission date: November 2010
- Owner: Duke Energy

Solar farm
- Type: Flat-panel PV
- Site area: 46 ha (114 acres)

Power generation
- Nameplate capacity: 16.6 MW_{p}, 14.4 MW_{AC}
- Capacity factor: 19% (years 2011-2017)
- Annual net output: 24 GW·h, 210MW·h/acre

The Blue Wing Solar Project is a 16.6 MW_{p} (14.4 MW_{AC}) solar photovoltaic (PV) power plant in San Antonio, Texas. It was one of the largest PV facilities in Texas when it came online in late 2010 and is owned by a Duke Energy Subsidiary.

== Project Details ==
The project covers 113 acres (46 ha) near the intersection of highways IH 37 and U.S. 181. It has 214,500 solar photovoltaic modules manufactured by US firm First Solar that are mounted onto fixed-tilt (20deg) racks. The plant is expected to produce more than 26 GWh of electricity per year.

The installation also includes a 500-kilowatt demonstration facility where a variety of other thin film and crystalline silicon PV modules, as well as a concentrator photovoltaic (CPV) unit, have been installed for evaluation and comparison purposes.

== Electricity Production ==
Generation (MW·h) of Blue Wing Solar Energy Generation
Year	Jan	Feb	Mar	Apr	May	Jun	Jul	Aug	Sep	Oct	Nov	Dec	Total
2010											5,359	2,849	8,208
2011	614	1,521	2,148	2,920	3,423	3,988	3,393	3,554	2,644	2,183	1,216	1,035	28,639
2012	1,175	1,142	1,636	2,450	2,496	2,682	2,514	2,527	2,135	1,858	1,672	2,907	25,193
2013	1,293	1,662	2,476	2,006	2,428	2,346	2,498	2,538	2,095	1,922	1,243	1,179	23,688
2014	638	308	818	927	2,376	2,342	2,701	2,840	3,068	3,314	2,328	1,481	23,141
2015	1,080	1,089	1,394	1,453	1,439	2,235	2,556	2,717	2,327	1,994	1,220	2,464	21,969
2016	1,393	1,708	1,624	1,674	1,553	2,071	2,256	1,834	2,464	2,470	2,054	2,081	23,182
2017	675	866	1,561	1,976	2,554	2,472	2,588	2,337	1,953	2,180	1,663	1,769	22,594
Average Annual Production (years 2011-2017)													24,000

== See also ==
- List of photovoltaic power stations
- Renewable energy in the United States
- Renewable portfolio standard
- Solar power in the United States
