= Calaveras Power Station =

Series of power plants in Texas, US

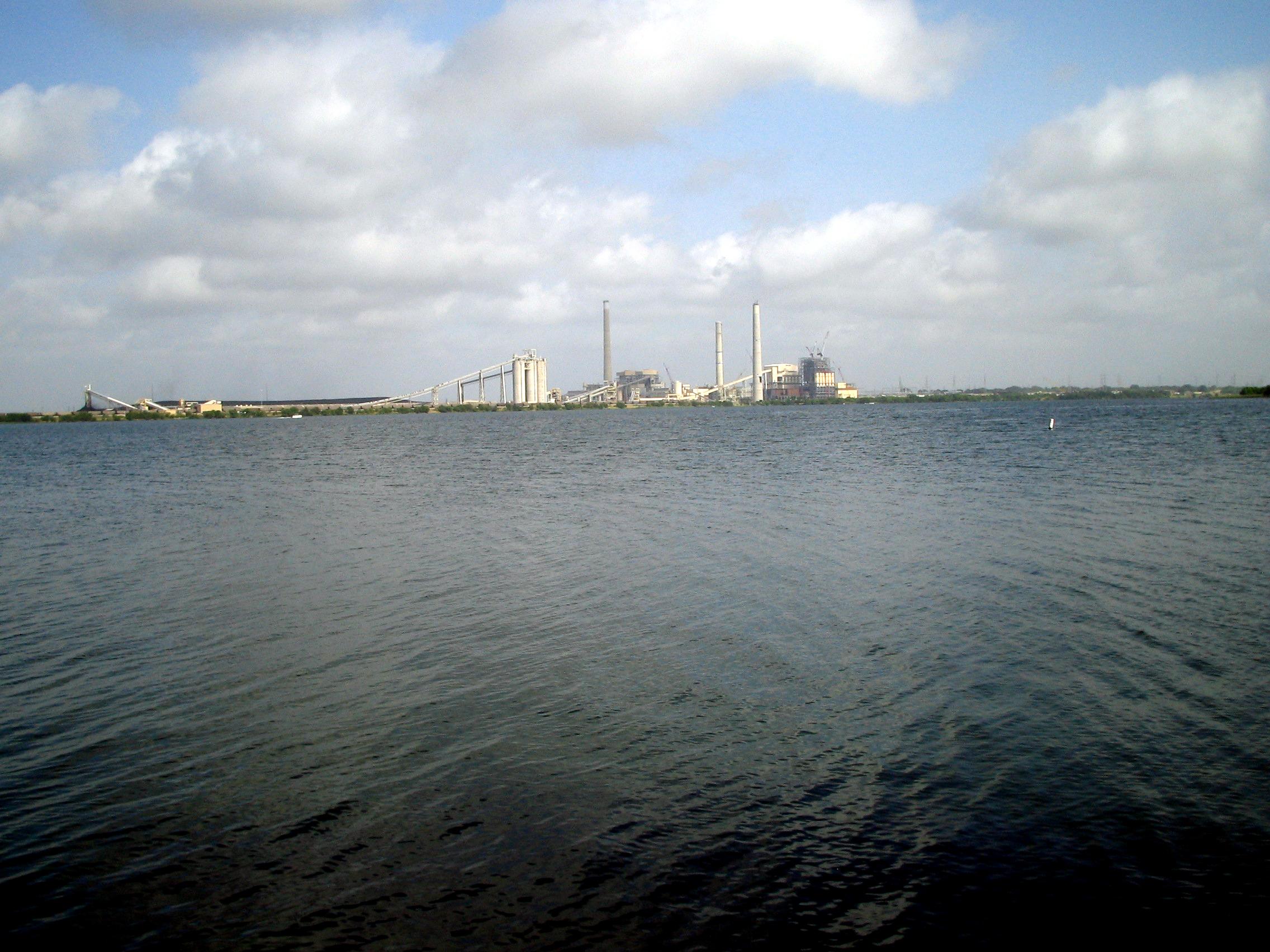
- Calaveras Power Station viewed from Calaveras Lake
- Official name: J.T. Deely Power Plant; O.W. Sommers Power Plant; J.K. Spruce Power Plant
- Country: United States
- Location: Bexar County, near San Antonio, Texas
- Coordinates: 29°18′27″N 98°19′26″W
- Status: Operational
- Commission date: J.T. Deely Power Plant; Unit 1: 1977; Unit 2: 1978; O.W. Sommers Power Plant; Unit 1: 1972; Unit 2: 1974; J.K. Spruce Power Plant; Unit 1: 1992; Unit 2: 2010
- Decommission date: J.T. Deely Power Plant; Units 1–2: December 31, 2018
- Owner: CPS Energy
- Operator: CPS Energy

Thermal power station
- Primary fuel: Coal; Natural gas
- Cooling source: Calaveras Lake

The Calaveras Power Station is a series of power plants located southeast of San Antonio, in Bexar County, Texas, near Calaveras Lake. These plants include the J.T. Deely Power Plant, the O.W. Sommers Power Plant, and the J.K. Spruce Power Plant. They are operated by CPS Energy.

== J.T. Deely Power Plant ==
J.T. Deely Power Plant was a two unit, 871 megawatt (MW) coal power plant located at the Calaveras Power Station. They were operated by CPS Energy and ran from 1977 to 2018.

== O.W. Sommers Power Plant ==
O.W. Sommers is a two unit natural gas power plant with a combined capacity of 892 MW. Unit 1 began commercial generation in 1972 and Unit 2 began in 1974. The plant is named after former CPS General Manager, Otto W. Sommers.

== J.K. Spruce Power Plant ==
J.K. Spruce is a two unit coal power plant with a combined capacity of 1,300 MW. Construction of Unit 1 was completed in 1992. The plant is named after former CPS General Manager, Jack Spruce. A LO-NOx burner was installed to Unit 1 in 1999 to reduce nitrogen oxide (NO_{x}) emissions. In order to meet future electricity demand, CPS Energy commissioned Unit 2 in 2005 and was completed in 2010 at a cost of $1 billion. The second unit constructed included modern pollution controls such as the installation of a SCR system and flue-gas desulfurization (FGD) system which removed NO_{x} and sulfur dioxide (SO_{2}) respectively. According to a report by Synapse Energy Economics, Spruce operated at an estimated loss of $135 million from 2015 to 2016 as depressed natural gas prices made coal uneconomical to operate. Moody's revealed in a 2018 report that a generator issue at Spruce's Unit 2 has made the unit run at less than half its capacity thereby raising the plant's expenses. In January 2023, CPS Energy's board of trustees voted to shut down Unit 1 and convert Unit 2 to natural gas by 2028, thereby ending the use of coal-fired power generation to power San Antonio's power grid.

== See also ==
- List of power stations in Texas
