= Elbow Creek Wind Project =

Wind farm in Texas, United States

- Country: United States
- Location: Big Spring, Texas
- Coordinates: 32°12′57.07″N 101°25′51.35″W
- Commission date: 2008
- Owner: NRG Energy

Wind farm
- Type: Onshore

Power generation
- Units operational: 53
- Nameplate capacity: 122 MW

The Elbow Creek Wind Project was a 122 megawatt (MW) wind farm beginning in 2008 in Howard County near Big Spring, Texas. The project used 53 Siemens 2.3 MW wind turbine generators, which provide enough electricity for nearly 100,000 households. It was repowered in 2019.
