= Webberville Solar Farm =

Photovoltaic array in Texas, USA

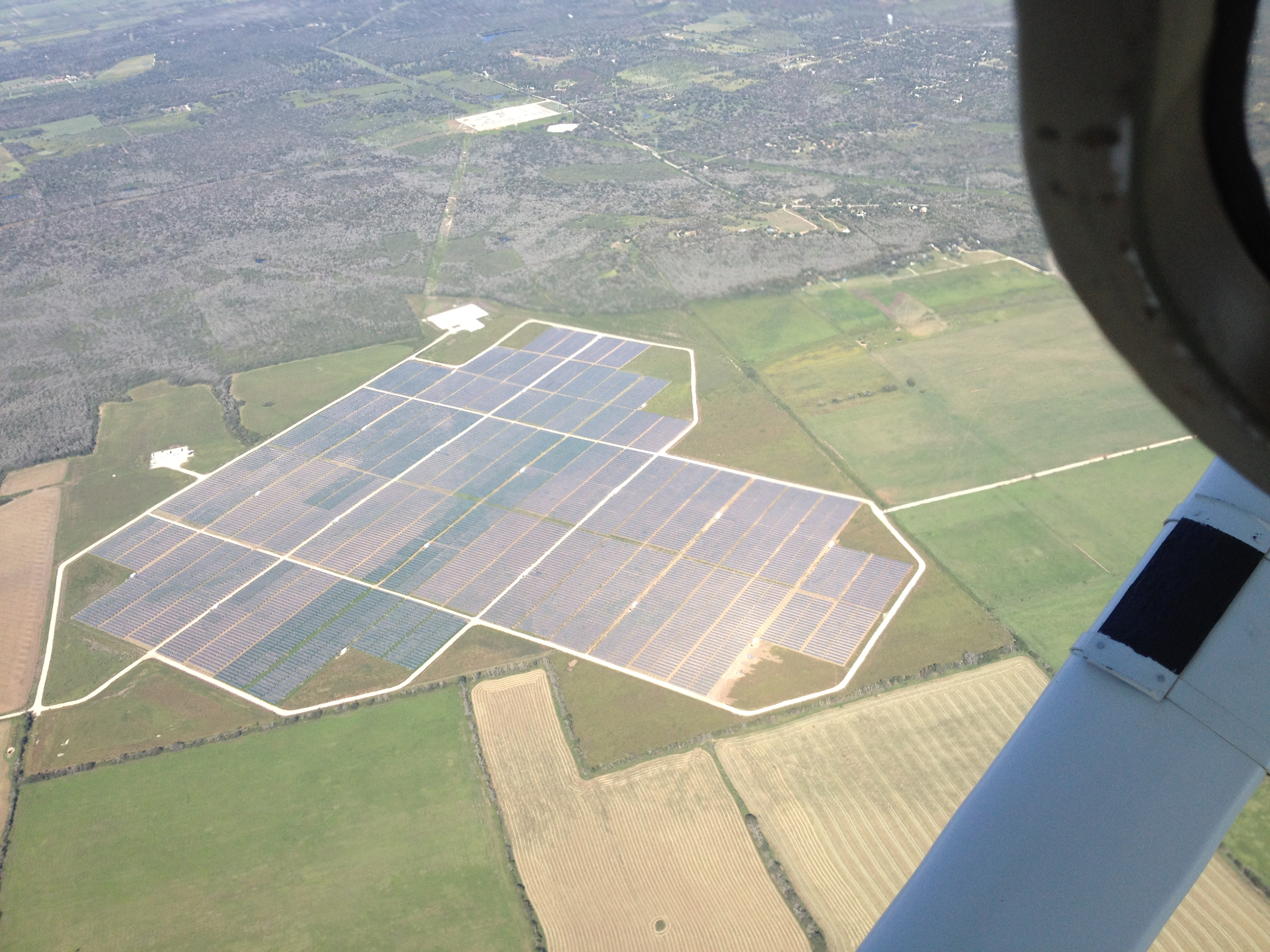
- Aerial Photo of Webberville Solar Farm
- Country: United States
- Location: Webberville, Texas
- Coordinates: 30°14′18″N 97°30′31″W
- Status: Operational
- Commission date: 2012

Solar farm
- Type: Flat-panel PV
- Site area: 155 ha (383 acres)

Power generation
- Nameplate capacity: 35 MW_{p}, 30 MW_{AC}
- Capacity factor: 21.7% (years 2012-2017)
- Annual net output: 56.9 GW·h, 150MW·h/acre

The Webberville Solar Farm, is a 35 MW_{p} (30 MW_{AC}) photovoltaic array in located in Webberville, Texas, only about 6 miles east of the Tesla Gigafactory 5. It has 127,728 Trina Solar solar panels mounted on single-axis trackers, covers an area of 380 acres (150 ha), and was built at a cost of $250 million. It is expected to generate 61 GWh in the first year of operation, and 1.4 billion kWh over its 25 year life. Operation began on December 20, 2011, with a ribbon cutting by Austin mayor Lee Leffingwell on January 6, 2012.

The project was constructed by RES Americas, who will operate the plant for five years. In 2012, SunEdison sold the plant to MetLife and Longsol Holdings, but will operate the plant for 20 years upon the expiration of the responsibilities of RES Americas. Austin Energy is purchasing the power generated under a 25 year PPA, and has a goal of generating 35% of power consumed from renewable resources by 2020.

Solar panels
Watts	Number	Total
270	32,018	8.644860 MW
275	63,238	17.390450 MW
280	32,022	8.966160 MW
Total	127,278	35.0 MW

Source:Webberville Solar Farm

== Electricity Production ==
Generation (MW·h) of Webberville Solar Project
Year	Jan	Feb	Mar	Apr	May	Jun	Jul	Aug	Sep	Oct	Nov	Dec	Total
2012	3,049	2,915	4,144	6,269	6,363	6,941	6,094	6,465	5,440	4,707	4,229	7,364	63,980
2013	3,211	4,110	6,113	5,017	6,068	5,861	6,217	6,343	5,173	4,810	3,112	2,943	58,978
2014	3,713	1,799	4,841	5,473	6,113	5,835	6,738	6,857	5,186	5,573	3,698	2,134	57,960
2015	3,060	3,244	4,183	4,535	4,400	5,943	6,916	6,296	5,482	4,721	2,129	2,820	53,729
2016	2,973	3,533	3,635	3,492	2,931	4,273	5,106	4,377	4,289	4,454	2,843	2,185	44,091
2017	1,866	2,393	4,316	5,460	7,057	6,832	7,153	6,459	5,397	6,024	4,597	4,890	62,444
Average Annual Production (years 2012-2017)													56,900

== See also ==
- Solar power in Texas
