= Calaveras Lake (Texas) =

Power plant cooling reservoir in Texas, US

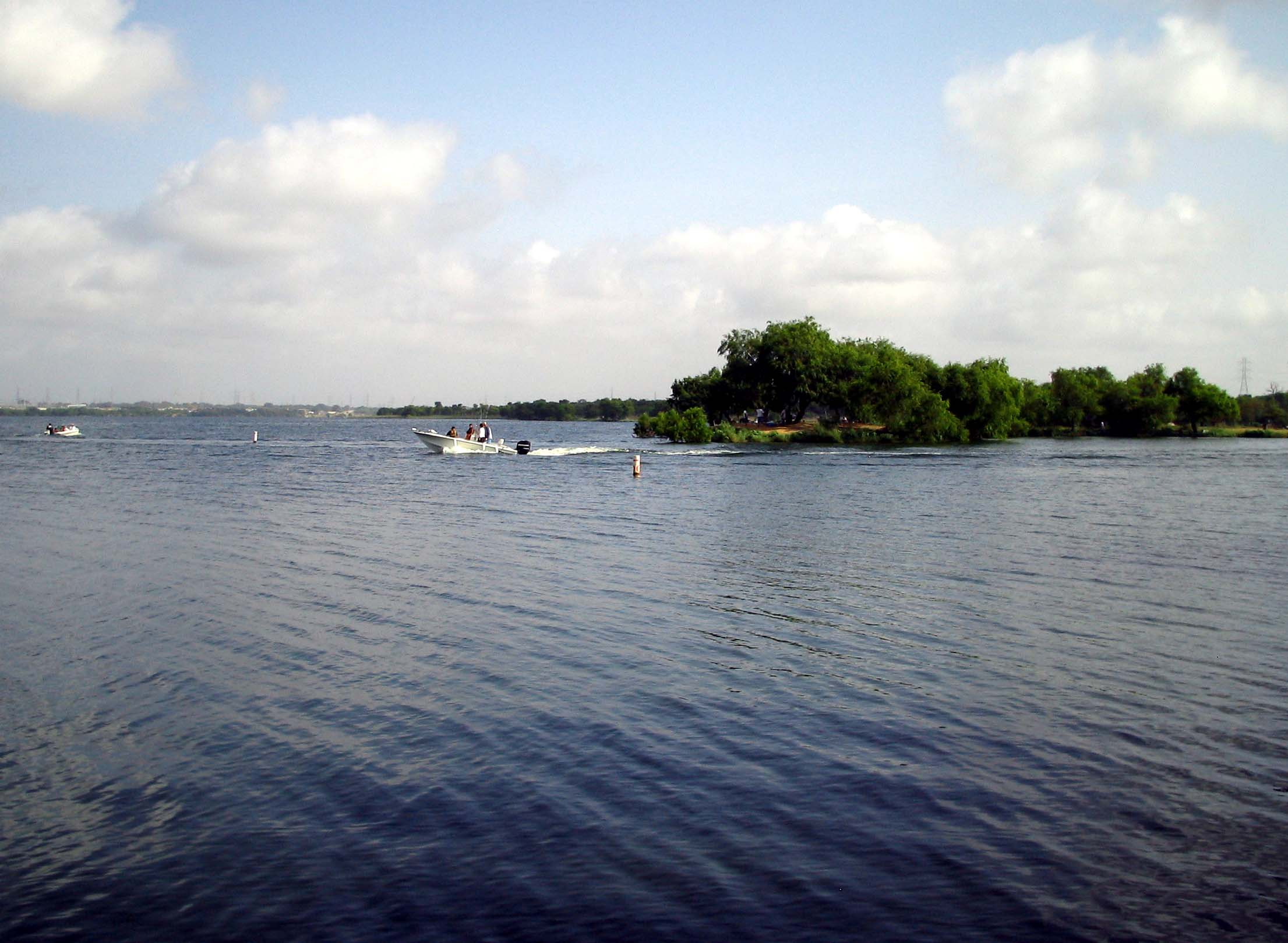

- Location within Texas Location within the United States
- Location: Bexar County, near San Antonio, Texas
- Coordinates: 29°16′46″N 98°18′14″W
- Type: Power plant cooling reservoir
- Primary inflows: Calaveras Creek
- Primary outflows: Calaveras Creek
- Basin countries: United States
- Surface area: 3,695 acres (1,495 ha)
- Max. depth: 45 ft (14 m)
- Surface elevation: 485 ft (148 m)

Calaveras Lake is a reservoir on Calaveras Creek, located 20 miles (32 kilometers) southeast of Downtown San Antonio, Texas, US. The reservoir was formed in 1969 by the construction of a dam to provide a cooling pond for a series of power plants, called the Calaveras Power Station, to supply additional electricity to the city of San Antonio.

The dam and lake are managed by CPS Energy of San Antonio. Together with the smaller Victor Braunig Lake, Calaveras Lake was one of the first projects in the nation to use treated wastewater for power plant cooling. The reservoir is partly filled with wastewater that has undergone both primary and secondary treatment at a San Antonio Water System treatment plant. Calaveras Lake also serves as a venue for recreation, including fishing and boating. Sailboats are prohibited on the lake.

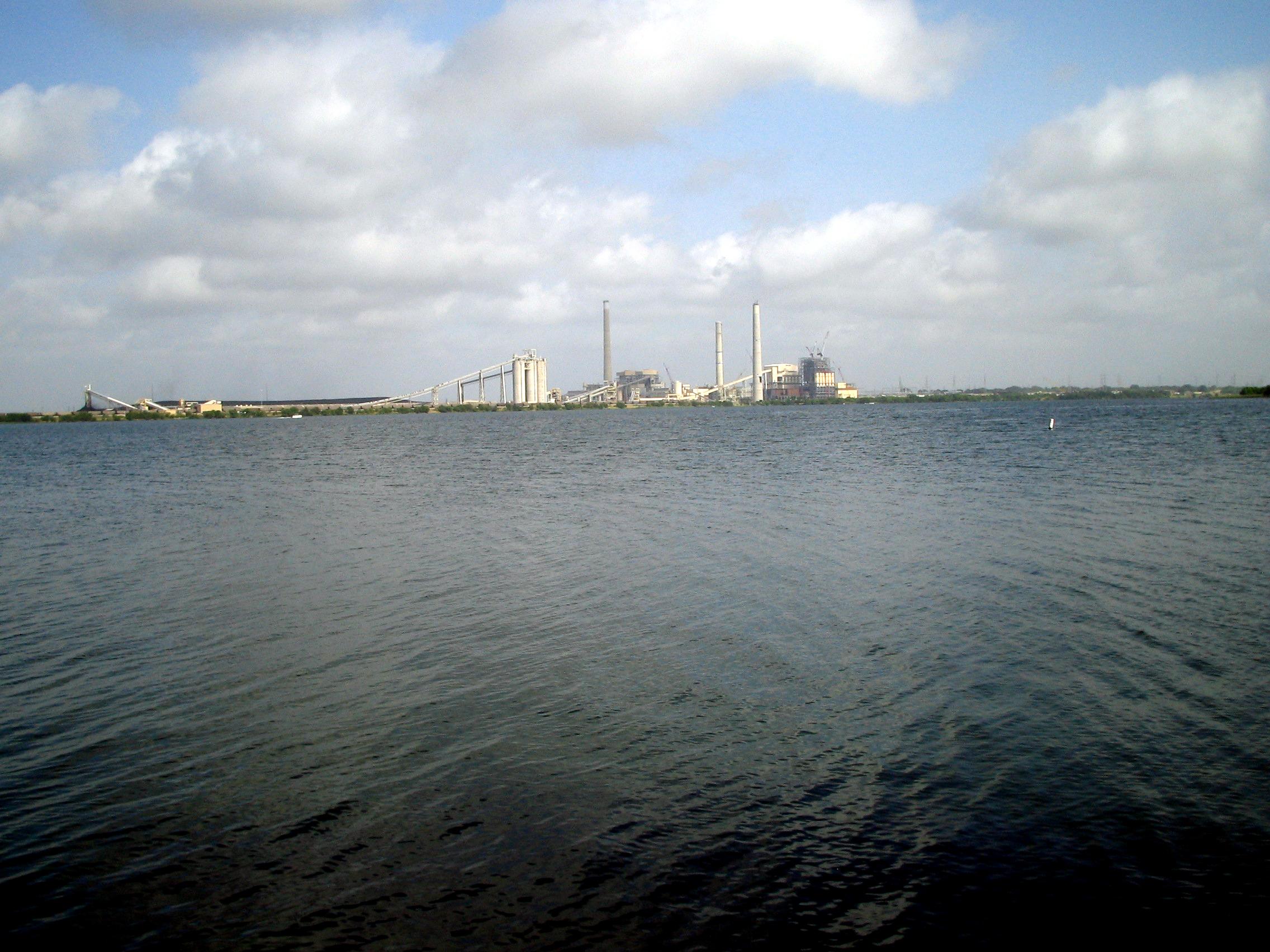
The Calaveras Power Station is a prominent feature on the shore of Calaveras Lake.

== Fish and plant life ==
Calaveras Lake has been stocked with many species of fish for recreational fishing. Fish present in Calaveras Lake include red drum, hybrid striped bass, catfish, largemouth bass.

== Recreational uses ==
Thousand Trails Management Services operates the 147 acre (57 ha) public facility under contract with CPS Energy at the lake. The lake features facilities for camping, picnicking, fishing, boating, and hiking.

== In popular culture ==
Calaveras Lake is the setting of one of the culminating scenes in the 1996 film Courage Under Fire, during which Matt Damon's character reveals his knowledge of the truth regarding the death of the character of Captain Karen Walden, the investigation of which constitutes the subject of the film up to that point.

== See also ==
- List of lakes in Texas
