= Hackberry Wind Project =

Wind-powered electricity generating facility in Texas, USA

- Country: United States
- Location: 177 Private Road Albany, TX 76430
- Coordinates: 32°49′27″N 99°16′42″W
- Status: Operational
- Commission date: 2008

Wind farm
- Type: Onshore

Power generation
- Units operational: 72
- Make and model: Siemens Wind Power
- Nameplate capacity: 166 MW

The Hackberry Wind Project is a US $350 million wind farm in Shackelford County, Texas. The project consists of 72 Siemens wind turbines with a total capacity of 166 megawatts. The energy is used by residents of the City of Austin and surrounding communities, this usage is called a PPA or Power Purchase Agreement. Construction on the project began in January 2008 and was finished in December 2008, on-time and under budget.

== See also ==
- List of wind farms
- Wind power in the United States
- Wind power in Texas
