= Austin Energy =

Public utility in Texas

- More than electricity

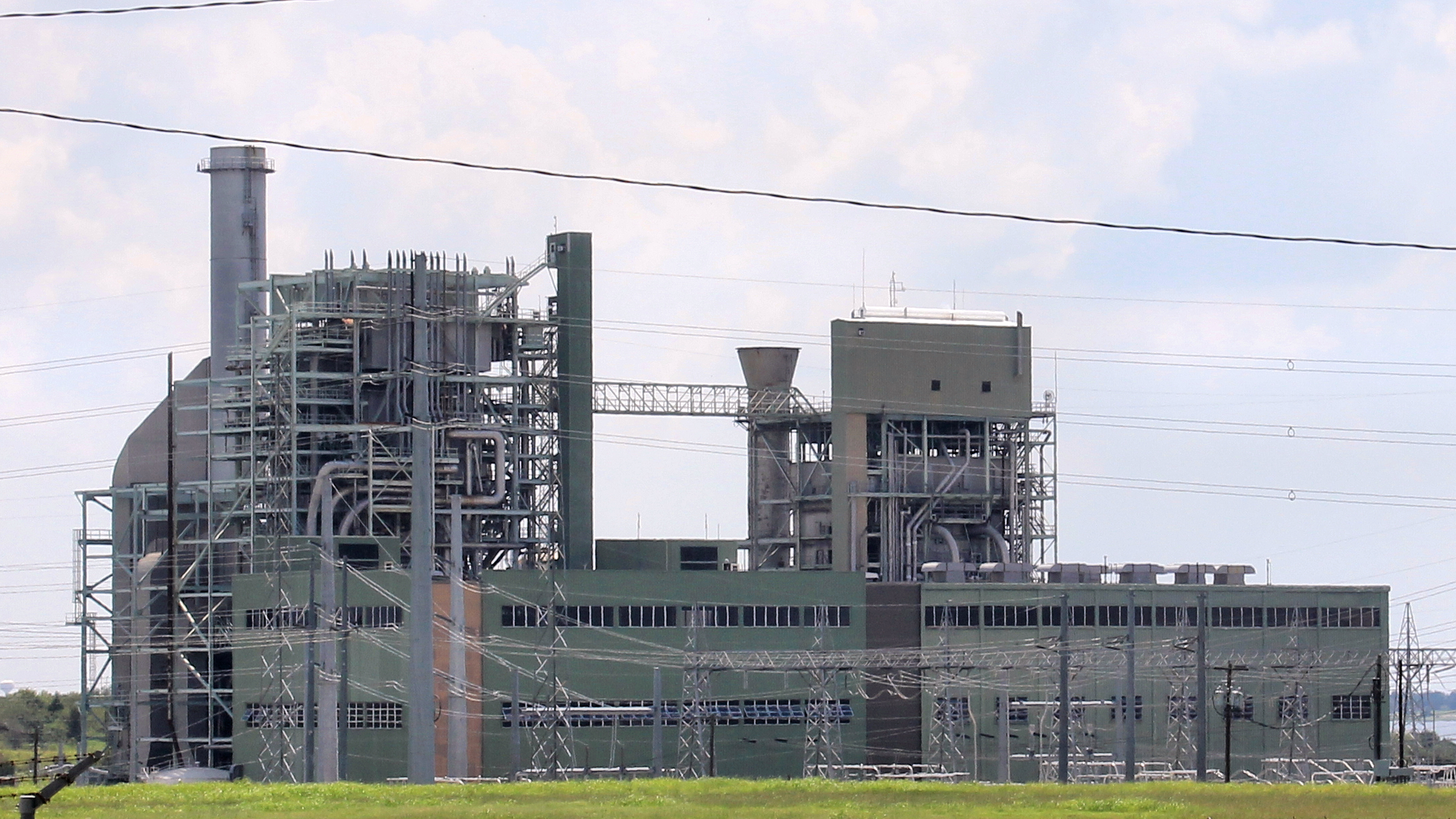
- The Decker Creek Power Station, one of Austin Energy's power plants.
- Company type: Public utility
- Industry: Electric power
- Founded: 1895
- Headquarters: Austin, Texas
- Area served: Travis & Williamson counties, Texas
- Owner: City of Austin
- Website: austinenergy.com

Austin Energy is a publicly owned utility providing electrical power to the city of Austin, Texas and surrounding areas. Established in 1895, the utility is a department of the City of Austin and returns its profits to the city's general fund to finance other city services. Austin Energy is the United States' 7th largest public utility, serving more than 500,000 customers and more than one million residents (as of 2019) within a service area of approximately 437 square miles (1,130 km^{2}), including the Austin, Travis County and a small portion of Williamson County.

== Energy generation ==
Austin Energy’s total generation capacity is more than 3,000 megawatts (MW), provided by a mixture of wind power, solar power, biomass, natural gas, nuclear power, and coal. All of Austin Energy's generation is sold into the ERCOT wholesale market; all of the retail load is served by purchasing power from ERCOT.

=== Generation assets ===
Austin Energy owns and operates two natural gas-fired power plants in the Austin area: the Decker Creek Power Station and the Sand Hill Energy Center. The utility also owns 50% of units 1 and 2 at the coal-fired Fayette Power Project in La Grange and 16% of the South Texas Nuclear Project in Bay City (near Houston). The STNP was the subject of a binding citizen referendum (November 3, 1981) to sell Austin's part in the project. STNP went online in 1986. No council has sold Austin's STNP, telling citizens that "no one wanted our 16 percent".

Austin Energy's 2030 generation resource plan called for the retirement of its share in the coal-fired Fayette Power Project by the end of 2022, but multi-year negotiations with co-owner LCRA stalled in late 2021.

| Unit | Fuel | Capacity (MW) | Construction year |
|---|---|---|---|
| Decker Creek Power Station (Austin) | Gas | 200 | 1967–1978 |
| Fayette Power Project (La Grange, 50% Share) | Coal | 600 | 1979–1980 |
| Robert Mueller Energy Center (Austin) | Gas | 4.6 | 2006 |
| Sand Hill Energy Center (Del Valle) | Gas | 595 | 2001–2010 |
| South Texas Project (Bay City, 16% Share) | Nuclear | 430 | 1988–1989 |

==== Renewable energy ====
As of July 2014, renewable energy represented roughly 23% of Austin Energy's generation portfolio, which included wind, solar, landfill methane and biomass projects. The utility's 2014 generation plan indicated that it aimed to produce 50% of power from renewable sources and 75% from carbon-free sources by 2025. Since that time, new green energy generation assets have rapidly been brought online. As of August 2019, green energy had jumped to 43% of Austin Energy's generation mix, and by February 2020 included 1,425.6 MW of wind turbines and 644.6 MW of solar panels.

| Renewable Resources | Fuel type | Installed Capacity (MW) | First Operation Year | Contract Expiration Date |
|---|---|---|---|---|
| Sunset Farms | Landfill Methane | 4 | 1996 | 2021 |
| Tessman Road Landfill | Landfill Methane | 7.8 | 2003 | 2017 |
| Nacogdoches Power | Biomass | 105 | 2012 | |
| Webberville Solar Project | Solar | 30 | 2011 | 2036 |
| Roserock Solar | Solar | 157.5 | 2016 | 2036 |
| East Pecos (Bootleg) | Solar | 118.5 | 2017 | 2031 |
| Upton County (SPTX12B1) | Solar | 157.5 | 2017 | 2042 |
| La Loma Community Solar | Solar | 2.6 | 2018 | 2043 |
| Waymark | Solar | 178.5 | 2018 | 2043 |
| Whirlwind Energy Center | Wind | 59.8 | 2007 | 2027 |
| Hackberry Wind Project | Wind | 165.6 | 2008 | 2023 |
| Los Vientos II | Wind | 201.6 | 2013 | 2037 |
| Whitetail | Wind | 92.3 | 2013 | 2037 |
| Los Vientos III | Wind | 200 | 2015 | 2040 |
| Jumbo Road | Wind | 299.7 | 2015 | 2033 |
| Los Vientos IV | Wind | 200 | 2016 | 2041 |
| Midway Solar | Solar | 236 | 2018 | 2038 |
| Karankawa | Wind | 206.64 | 2019 | 2034 |
| Gulf Wind | Wind | 271.4 | 2009 | 2040 |

On April 23, 2019, Austin Energy reached an agreement to purchase the Nacogdoches biomass facility for $460 million. Since Austin Energy entered into the 20-year Power Purchase Agreement with the biomass facility the price of natural gas has come down significantly. The purchase – one of Austin's single largest purchases ever – is anticipated to allow the city to avoid $275 million in additional costs.

== Energy conservation ==
Austin Energy operates an energy efficiency program to help customers identify ways to reduce their energy consumption and save on utility bills. The utility offers various subsidies and rebates for efficiency improvements, including HVAC, insulation, efficient lighting, and photovoltaic panels.

In 1992, Austin Energy developed the nation's first local Green Building program. It shares the distinction of being the largest and best established green building program in the country along with Built Green Colorado in Denver.

== Electric vehicle program ==
Austin Energy’s Plug-In EVerywhere network, powered by 100% renewable energy, expanded to 186 public charging stations to help drive a two-year, 300% Austin EV growth rate. Austin Energy led a 10-county, regional effort to develop a community plan that supports the adoption of EVs and successfully deployed the first-of-its-kind EV home charging Demand Response program.

== Criticism ==
Austin Energy has been criticized for increasing energy prices to fund renewable energy projects and for the 2011 rolling blackouts. It has also been criticized for its handling of the Texas freeze in early 2021. Critics have called Austin Energy a "monopoly", since Austin didn't follow suit in the deregulation that approximately 1/3rd of Texas cities have been part of.

Austin Energy received significant criticism, including calls for its executive team to resign, during an ice storm that occurred on February 1, 2023 for failing to prepare for adverse weather, poorly communicating with customers, and not being able to restore power to customers within a reasonable time frame.
