= Lubbock Power and Light =

Lubbock Power & Light
- Logo
- Trade name: LP&L
- Company type: Municipal corporation
- Industry: Energy
- Predecessors: Malone Light & Ice Co.; Texas Utilities Co.
- Founded: 1916; 109 years ago
- Key people: Joel Ivy (Director)
- Products: Electricity & Public services billing
- Revenue: ▲$243.9 million USD (2017)
- Owner: City of Lubbock
- Website: lpandl.com

Lubbock Power and Light (LP&L) is third largest municipal electric utility in Texas. LP&L serves more than 101,000 electric meters and owns and maintains 4,300 square miles (11,000 km^{2}) of power lines and three power plants in and around the City of Lubbock, Texas.

== History ==
In 1909, Lubbock Electric Light & Power Company was the first attempt at forming a private power company in Lubbock. However, the company failed shortly thereafter. Lubbock Light & Ice Company was formed following the demise of the first company. Expected growth was not realized, so company was sold in 1913 to local businessmen who renamed it Malone Light & Ice Company. The Malone company was sold to Texas Utilities Co. on September 7, 1915.

On December 21, 1916, the Lubbock city council voted to build a new power plant after failing to negotiate rate concessions from Texas Utilities. The plant came online on or before September 17, 1917, and formed the backbone of what eventually became LP&L.

From 1993 to 2003, successive city councils drew more than $60 million from the company's reserve fund to cover unrelated expenses. Additionally, six years of chronic mismanagement resulted in a $22 million operating deficit. The company teetered on bankruptcy. Beginning in 2004, the city restructured the company, including creating an independent utility board. Contributions to the city's general fund restarted in 2010.

The company completed the acquisition of Xcel Energy’s meters and distribution systems within the city on October 29, 2010. The assets were previously owned by the Southwest Public Service Co., effectively ending sixty years of competition between the two companies.

== Switch to ERCOT ==
In March of 2018, LP&L announced their intentions to open the Lubbock power grid to a competitive market. This change would be accomplished by joining the Electric Reliability Council of Texas or ERCOT. LP&L has stated that this move will provide more affordable power by eliminating the need to build an expensive power plant with estimated costs ranging up to $700 million. This new power plant was proposed as a state-of-the-art natural gas fired plant that would have sent power into the existing LP&L grid. This change will also cut wholesale power costs by eliminating the current fixed capacity charges and create a revenue stream for Lubbock ratepayers through new transmission lines connecting Lubbock to the ERCOT system.

The other advertised benefits of the switch to ERCOT will...

- Provide full access to West Texas wind and a mix of conventional and renewable electric generation such as natural gas, solar and coal and Provide stability through access to 570 Texas-based generation units, avoiding dependence on one unit.
- Avoid primary regulation by the Federal Government (Federal Energy Regulatory Commission or “FERC”).
- Involves regulation by the Public Utility Commission of Texas and the Texas Legislature. Provide access to Texas power plants and over 1,800 active market participants that generate, sell, or transmit wholesale electricity.
- Opens the door to retail electric competition in Lubbock.

This change would allow Lubbock residents currently on the LP&L service grid to choose who provides their power, possibly making rates lower by making them more competitive.

Most Recently, the Federal Energy Regulatory Commission (FERC) has denied approval for this switch. LP&L states that they are still on track and committed to this decision.

== About ==
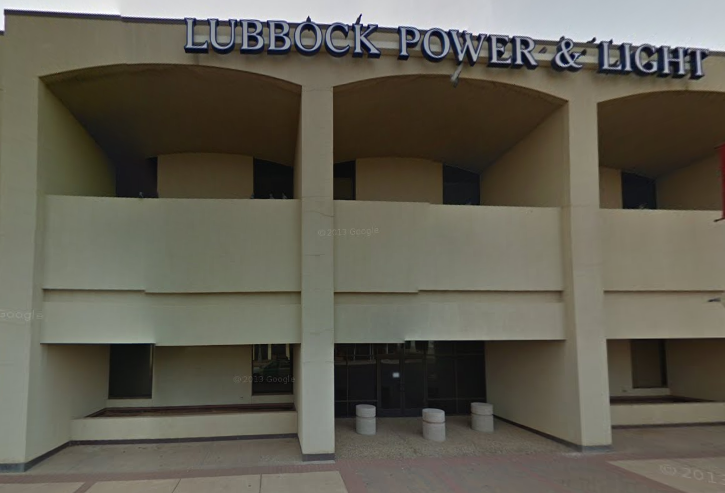
Lubbock Power & Light (LP&L) Office.

LP&L engages in electricity generation and distribution, as well as billing and meter reading services.

=== Executives ===
- Joel Ivy, Director of Electric Utilities
- Jenny Smith, General Counsel
- Andy Burcham, Assistant Director/CFO
- Blair McGinnis, Chief Operating Officer
- Chris Sims, Director of Grid Control & Compliance
- Matt Rose, Public Affairs & Government Relations Manager

=== Electric Utility Board ===
On November 2, 2004, Lubbock voters elected to amend the Charter of the city to provide for an Electric Utility Board to supervise LP&L. The board's responsibilities include oversight, fiscal maintenance, and promotion of an orderly economic and business-like administration of LP&L.

Current Board As of (May 5, 2023)

- Gwen Stafford, Chairman
- Edward E. "Butch" Davis, P.E., Vice Chairman
- Eddie Schultz, Secretary
- Solomon Fields
- Dan Odom
- Dan Wilson
- Lewis Harvill Jr., P.E.
- Petra Gambles
- Dr. Gonzalo Ramirez
- Tray Payne, Mayor of Lubbock
