= Amazon Wind Farm Texas =

Wind farm in Texas, United States

- Country: United States
- Location: Scurry County
- Coordinates: 32°51′50″N 100°58′30″W
- Status: Operational
- Commission date: 2017
- Construction cost: $493.4 million (2017)

Wind farm
- Type: Onshore
- Rotor diameter: 116 m (381 ft)

Power generation
- Units operational: 110 × 2.3 MW
- Make and model: GE Renewable Energy 2.3-116 (110)
- Nameplate capacity: 253 MW
- Capacity factor: 44.67 %
- Annual net output: 990,097 MW h (2019)

Amazon Wind Farm Texas is a 253 megawatt wind farm in Scurry County, Texas. The farm opened in late 2017, and consists of 110 turbines, which together generate approximately 1,000 gigawatt-hours of electricity annually, enough to power approximately 90,000 US homes.

On October 19, 2017, Jeff Bezos, the founder of Amazon, christened the wind farm by smashing a champagne bottle while standing on top of one of the 300 feet (91 m) tall turbines. In a statement, Amazon revealed that it has entered into an agreement to purchase 90 percent of the facility's output. The facility was built by Lincoln Clean Energy, now part of Ørsted, which also owns and operates the wind farm. This facility is one example of Amazon's large and increasing long-term investment in renewable energy.

The wind farm, which is a few miles from the ghost town of Dermott, is called Dermott Wind in Energy Information Administration and Electric Reliability Council of Texas sources.

== See also ==
- Wind power in Texas
- Wind power in the United States
