= Texas Interconnection =

Power grid providing power to most of Texas

The two major and three minor NERC Interconnections, and the nine NERC Regional Reliability Councils.

The Texas Interconnection is an alternating current (AC) power grid – a wide area synchronous grid – that covers most of the state of Texas. The grid is managed by the Electric Reliability Council of Texas (ERCOT).

The Texas Interconnection is one of the three minor grids in the North American power transmission grid. The other two minor interconnections are the Quebec Interconnection and the Alaska Interconnection. The two major interconnections are the Eastern Interconnection and the Western Interconnection. The Texas Interconnection is maintained as a separate grid for political, rather than technical reasons, but can draw some power from other grids using direct current DC ties. By not crossing state lines, the synchronous power grid is in most respects not subject to federal (Federal Energy Regulatory Commission) regulation.

All of the electric utilities in the Texas Interconnection are electrically tied together during normal system conditions and operate at a synchronous frequency of 60 Hz.

== Electric Reliability Council of Texas ==
The Electric Reliability Council of Texas (ERCOT) manages the flow of electric power on the Texas Interconnection that supplies power to 26 million Texas customers – representing 90 percent of the state's electric load. ERCOT is the first independent system operator (ISO) in the United States and one of nine ISOs in North America. ERCOT works with the Texas Reliability Entity (TRE), one of eight regional entities within the North American Electric Reliability Corporation (NERC) that coordinate to improve reliability of the bulk power grid.

As the ISO for the region, ERCOT dispatches power on an electric grid that connects 46,500 miles of transmission lines and more than 550 generation units. ERCOT also performs financial settlements for the competitive wholesale bulk-power market, and administers retail switching for 7 million premises in competitive choice areas.

ERCOT is a membership-based 501(c)(4) nonprofit corporation, governed by a board of directors, and subject to oversight by the Public Utility Commission of Texas (PUC) and the Texas Legislature.

ERCOT's members include consumers, electric cooperatives, generators, power marketers, retail electric providers, investor-owned electric utilities (transmission and distribution providers), and municipally owned electric utilities.

== Production ==
Electricity Production
Mode	2019 (GWh)	Percentage	2022 (GWh)	Percentage	2025 (GWh)	Percentage
Biomass	421	0.11%	625	0.15%	363	0.07%
Coal	77,857	20.30%	71,501	16.69%	63,040	12.74%
Gas	27,379	7.14%	29,627	6.91%	38,796	7.84%
Gas-CC	154,391	40.26%	153,358	35.79%	161,819	32.71%
Hydro	956	0.25%	344	0.08%	550	0.11%
Nuclear	41,314	10.77%	41,658	9.72%	41,912	8.47%
Other	24	0.01%	570	0.13%	5,538	1.12%
Solar	4,398	1.15%	24,193	5.65%	67,814	13.71%
Wind	76,708	20.00%	107,624	25.03%	114,921	23.23%
Total	383,447	100%	428,475	100%	494,753	100%

== Operating extremes ==
Power demand is highest in summer, primarily due to air conditioning use in homes and businesses. On July 19, 2018, consumer demand hit 73,259 MW. On Monday, August 12, 2019, a new peak of 74,820 MW was set between 4 p.m. and 5 p.m. Central Daylight Time (2200 GMT), as high temperatures in Houston hit 100 °F (38 °C). ERCOT had more than 78,000 MW of generating capacity available to meet demand in the summer of 2019, providing an adequate though not generous margin. For 2020, the forecasted peak demand is 76,696 MW. A megawatt of electricity can power about 200 Texas homes during periods of peak demand.

On Saturday, January 19, 2019, in an early morning period of low electricity demand, wind energy served more than 56% of total demand at 3:10 am, Central Standard Time. On Monday, January 21, 2019, ERCOT set a new wind output record of nearly 19.7 GW at 7:19 pm, Central Standard Time.

== Wind power in Texas ==
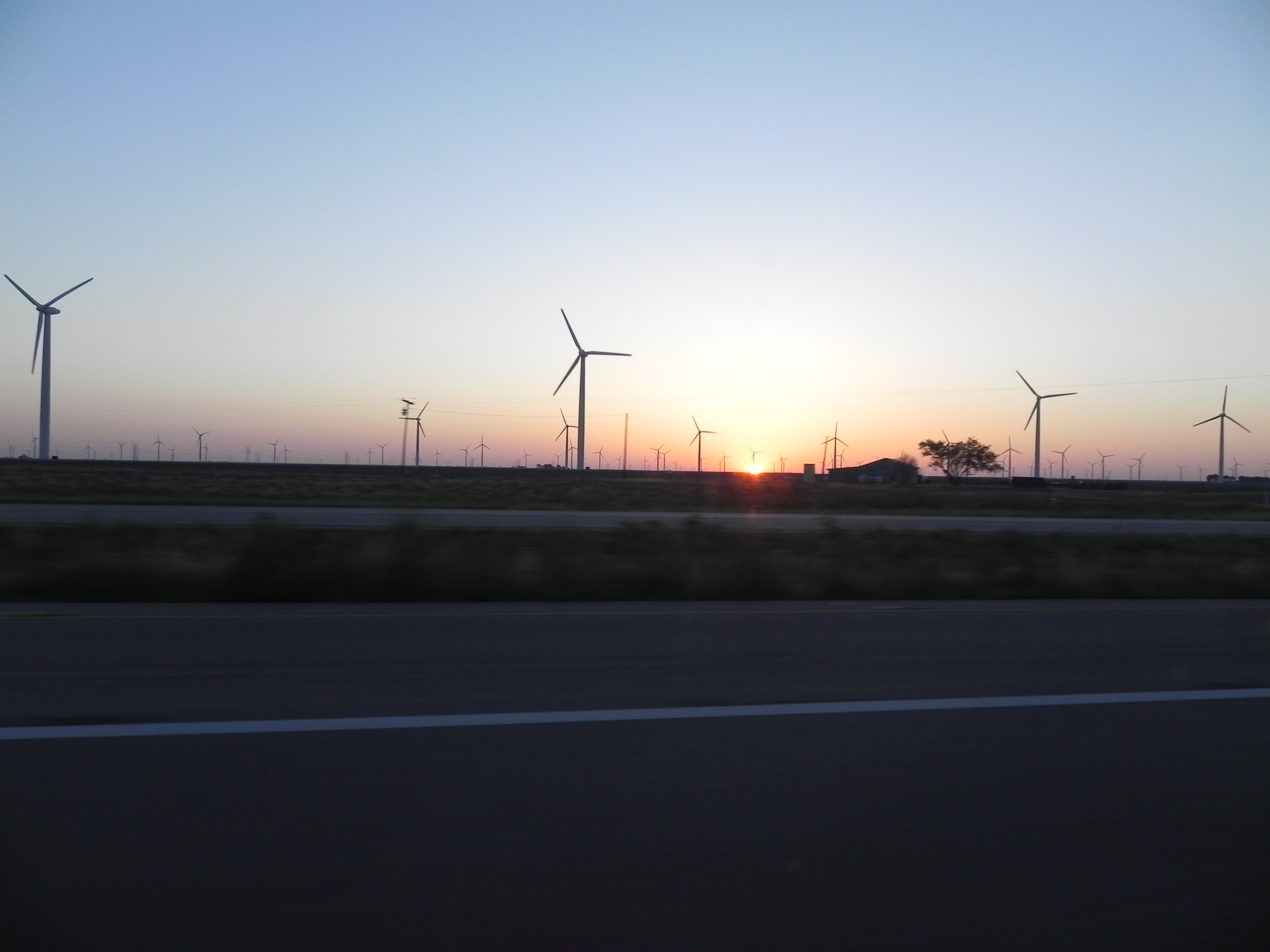
The 781 MW Roscoe Wind Farm at sunrise.

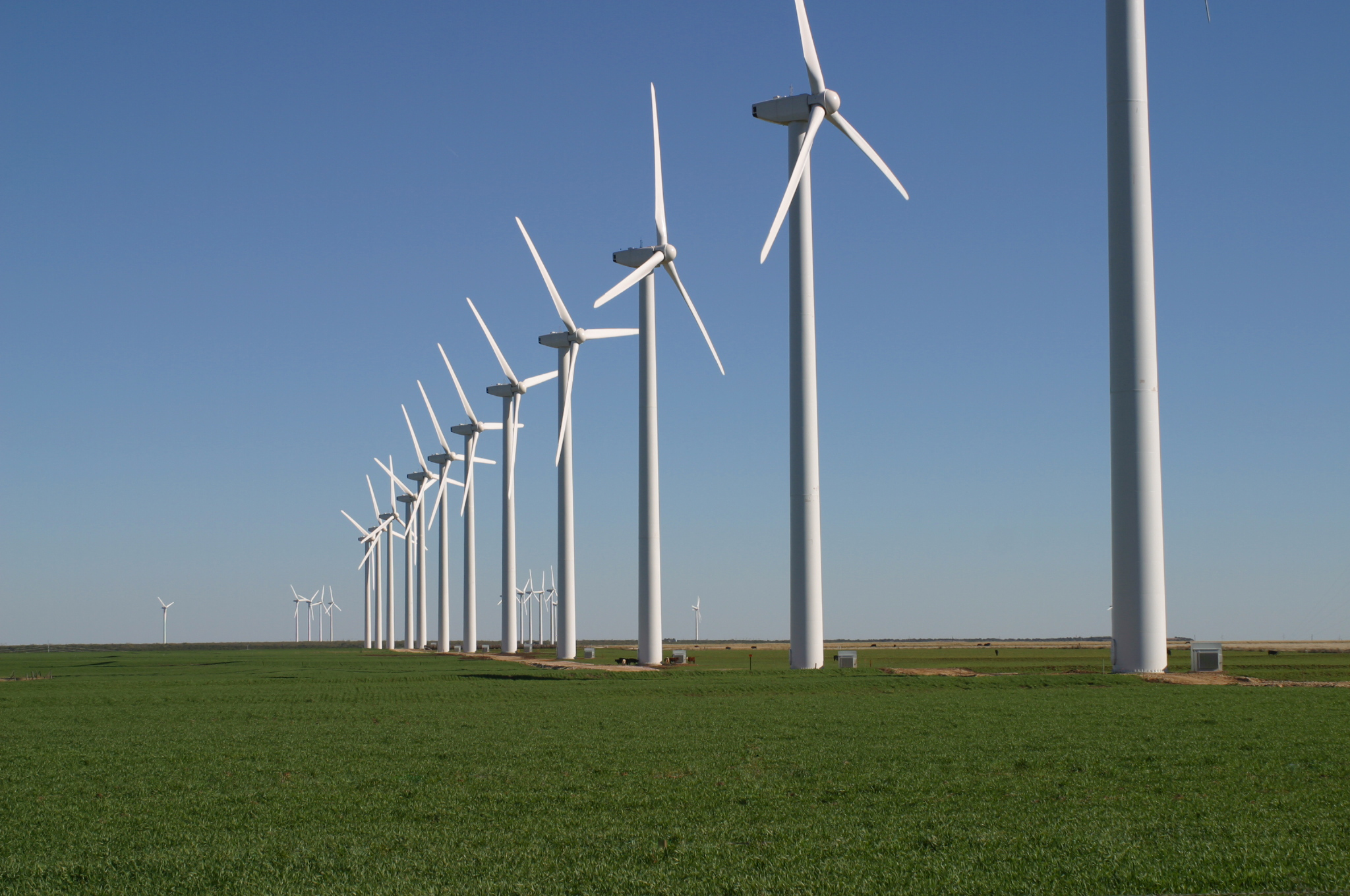
Brazos Wind Ranch

Wind power in Texas consists of over 40 wind farms, which together have a total nameplate capacity of over 30,000 MW, as of 2020. Texas produces the most wind power of any U.S. state and only a few countries exceed its installed capacity. According to ERCOT (Energy Reliability Council of Texas), wind power accounted for at least 15.7% of the electricity generated in Texas in 2017, as wind was 17.4% of electricity generated in ERCOT, which manages 90% of Texas's power.

The wind resource in many parts of Texas is very large. Farmers may lease their land to wind developers, creating a new revenue stream for the farm. The wind power industry has created over 24,000 jobs for local communities and for the state. Texas is seen as a profit-driven leader of renewable energy commercialization in the United States. The wind boom in Texas was assisted by expansion of the state's Renewable Portfolio Standard, use of designated Competitive Renewable Energy Zones, expedited transmission construction, and the necessary Public Utility Commission rule-making.

The Roscoe Wind Farm (781 MW), near the town of Roscoe, is the state's largest wind farm. Other large wind farms in Texas include: Horse Hollow Wind Energy Center, Sherbino Wind Farm, Capricorn Ridge Wind Farm, Sweetwater Wind Farm, Buffalo Gap Wind Farm, King Mountain Wind Farm, Desert Sky Wind Farm, Wildorado Wind Ranch, and the Brazos Wind Farm.

== Solar power in Texas ==
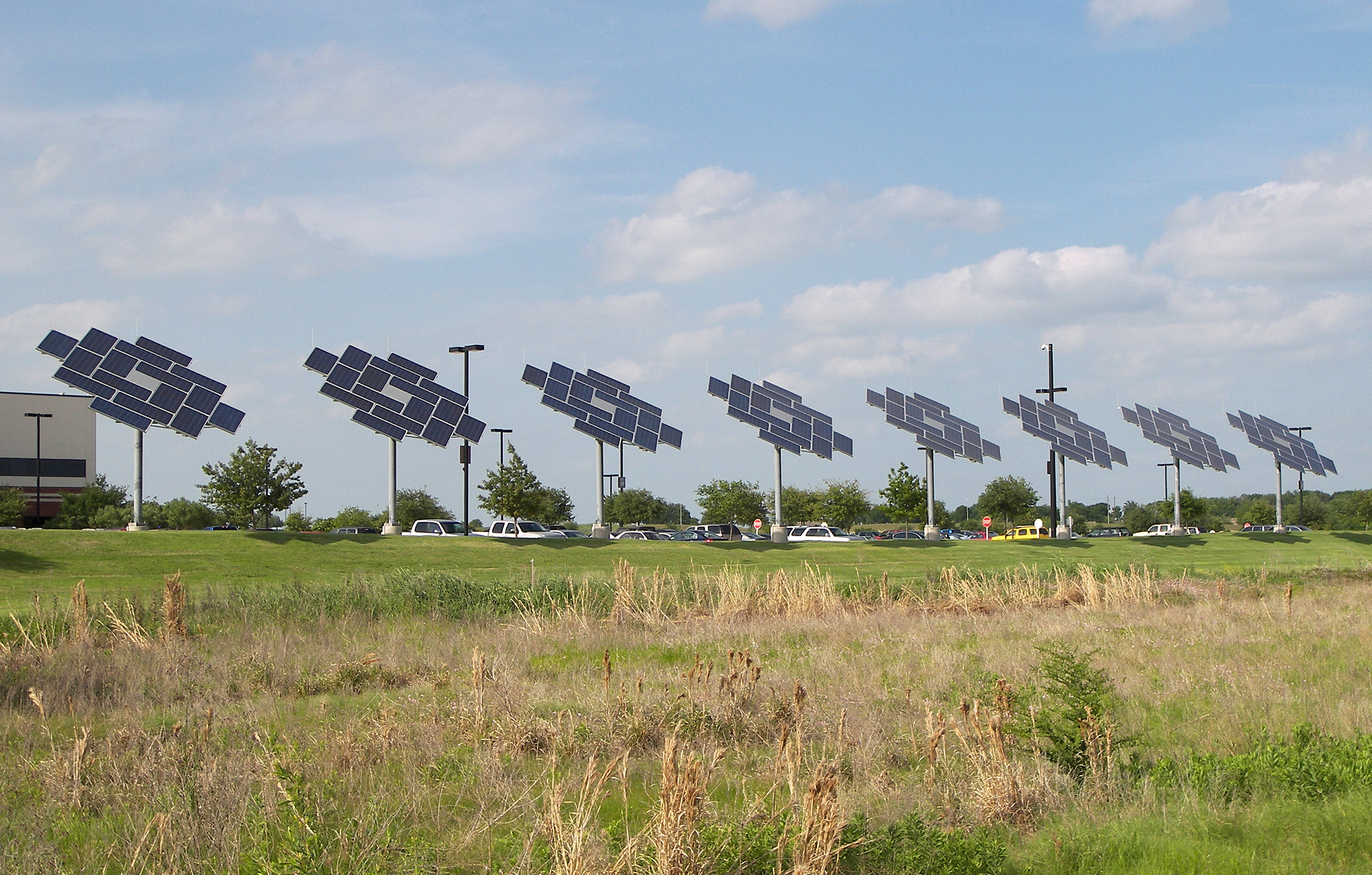
A solar array in Austin.

Solar power in Texas, along with wind power, has the potential to allow Texas to remain an energy-exporting state over the long term. The western portion of the state especially has abundant open land areas, with some of the greatest solar and wind potential in the United States. Development activities there are also encouraged by relatively simple permitting and significant available transmission capacity.

== Ties ==
Interconnections can be tied to each other via high-voltage direct current power transmission lines (DC ties), or with variable-frequency transformers (VFTs), which permit a controlled flow of energy while also functionally isolating the independent AC frequencies of each side. The Texas Interconnection is tied to the Eastern Interconnection with a 220 MW DC tie near Oklaunion, and a 600 MW DC tie near Monticello, and is tied to NERC (North American Electric Reliability Corporation) systems in Mexico with a 300 MW DC tie near McAllen, and a 100 MW VFT tie near Laredo. There is one AC tie switch in Dayton, Texas that has been used only once in its history, after Hurricane Ike.

In October 2009, the Tres Amigas SuperStation was announced to connect the Eastern, Western, and Texas Interconnections via eight 5 GW superconductor links, but the Eastern Interconnection withdrew from the project in 2015, rendering the project moot. Construction was never started.

In October 2024, the U.S. Department of Energy announced a contract award of $360 million from the Bipartisan Infrastructure Law to help build Pattern Energy’s Southern Spirit Transmission Project, a proposed 320-mile, 525-kV high voltage direct current line to connect the ERCOT grid with grids in the Southeast. If constructed, the line would provide three gigawatts of bidirectional capacity between Rusk County, Texas, and Choctaw County, Mississippi, and will use voltage source converter technology to enhance grid reliability—helping to mitigate disruptions like the power crisis in the winter of 2021. The project received final approval from the Federal Energy Regulatory Commission in May 2024.

== Outages ==
In February 2011, gas shortages and low temperatures led to 30 GW of capacity being unavailable and caused load shedding. There were prior severe cold weather events in 1983, 1989, 2003, 2006, 2008, and 2010.

In February 2021, record low temperatures during the February 13–17, 2021 North American winter storm caused large loss of coal, natural gas, wind, and nuclear power production, and a shortfall of over 10 gigawatts of customer demand, resulting in rolling blackouts across Texas affecting more than 4 million people. Although some wind turbines iced up, wind power produced more overall power than expected for this time of year.

Millions of people were without power and water for numerous days, leading people to resort to boiling snow as their only water source. Officially, the state of Texas blamed the 2021 storm for the death of 151 people, later revised to 246. The true number is believed to be four to five times that number, as many deaths are often attributed to underlying medical conditions instead of being related to loss of power, which could cause the failure of life sustaining at-home medical devices. For comparison, other states hit by the same winter storm, but without the power failure experienced by Texas, did not have an increase in the number of deaths like Texas did, indicating a correlation in the increase in deaths and the loss of power.
