= Energy in Texas =

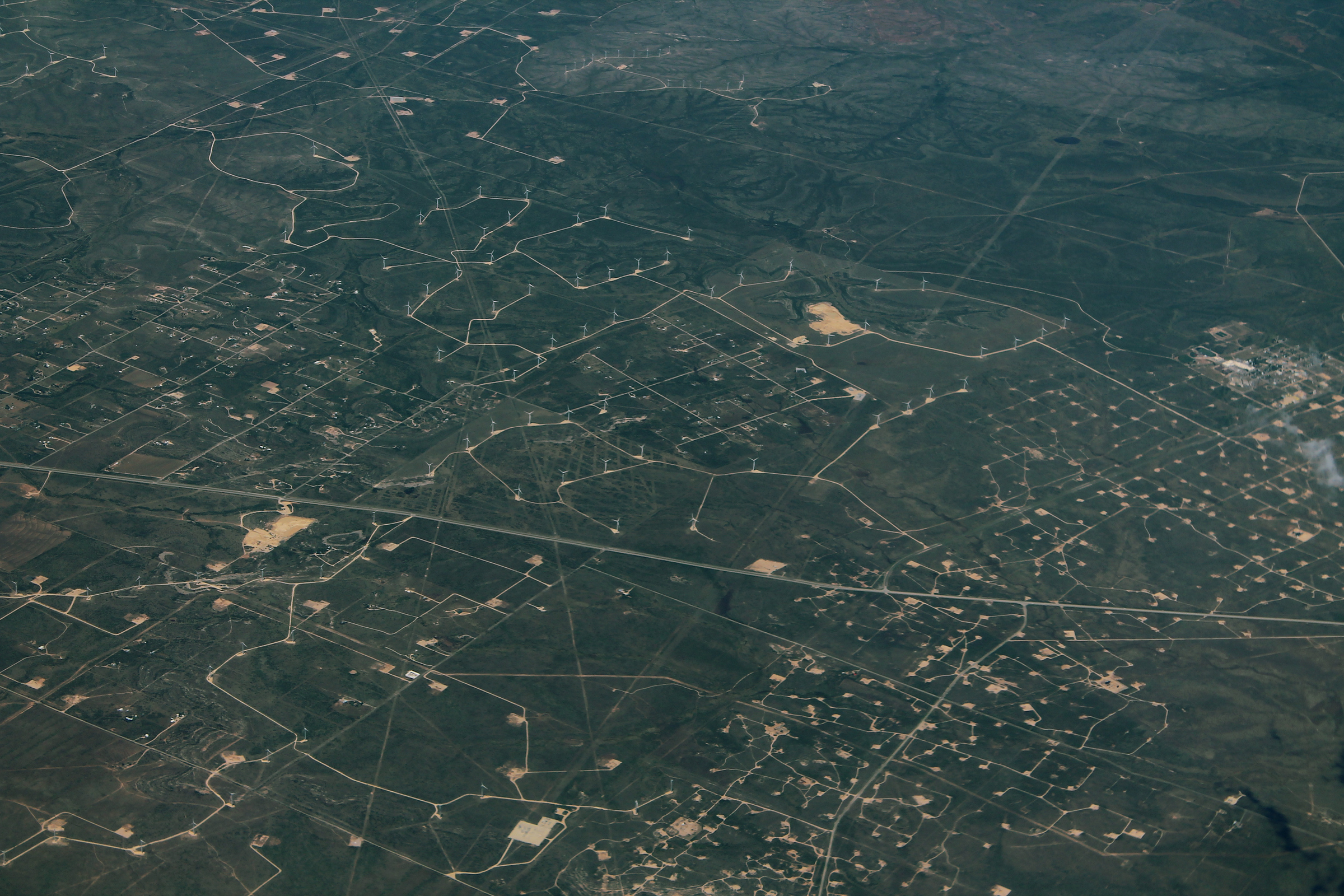
Oil fields and wind farms near Big Spring, Texas

Texas Net Electricity Generation by Source, 2025
1. Natural gas (40.5%)
2. Coal (12.7%)
3. Other fossil (1.01%)
4. Nuclear (8.47%)
5. Renewable - Wind (23.2%)
6. Renewable - Solar (13.7%)
7. Other Renewables - Hydro, Biomass (0.18%)

Energy is a major component of the economy of Texas. The state is the nation's largest energy producer, producing twice as much energy as Florida, the state with the second-highest production. It is also the national leader in wind power generation, comprising about 28% of national wind powered electrical production in 2019. Wind power surpassed nuclear power production in the state in 2014. Since 2003, Texas state officials have created various initiatives like the Texas Enterprise Fund and the Texas Emerging Technology Fund to develop the economy of Texas.

== Electricity ==
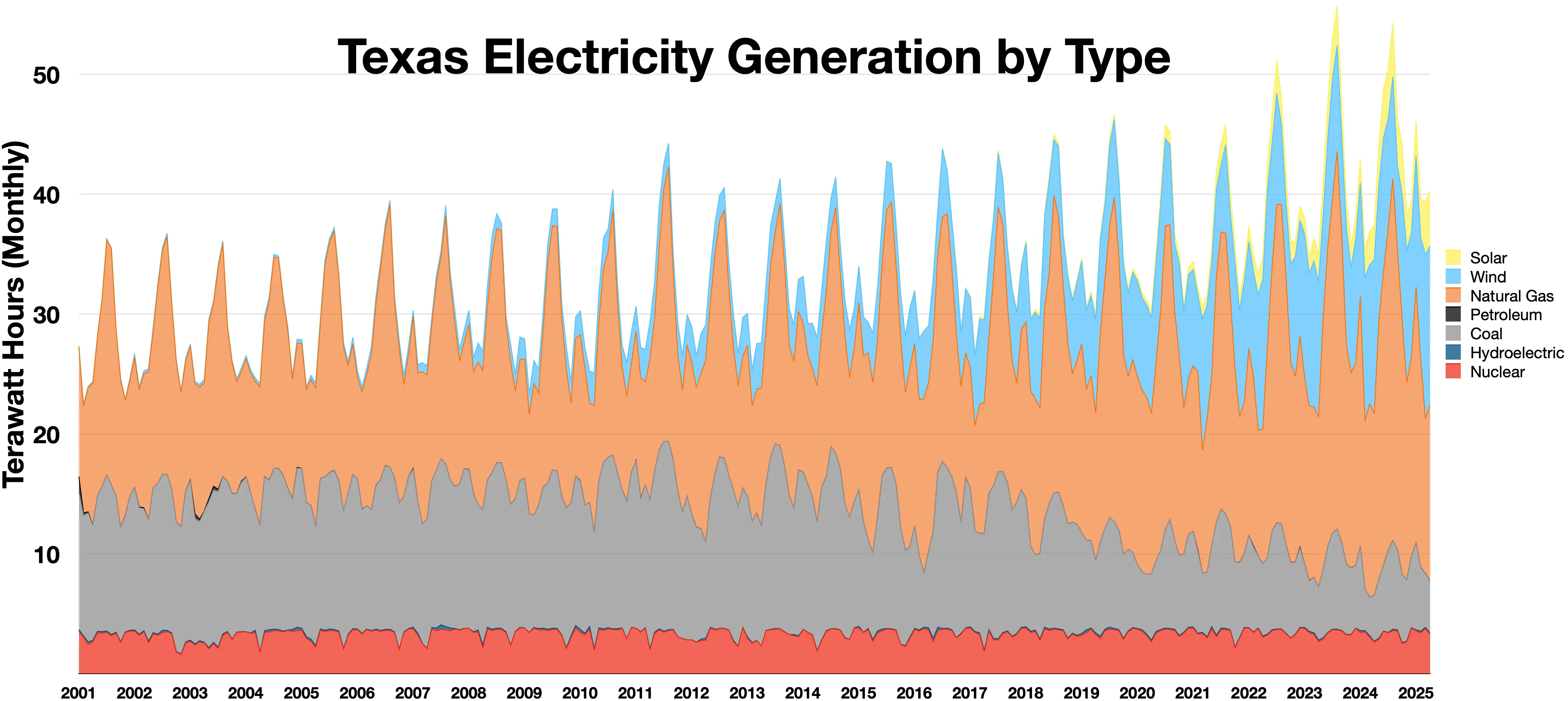
Texas electricity generation by type, 2001-2024

Since 2002, Texas has operated under a mostly deregulated electricity market (however, areas where electricity is provided by either a municipality or a utility cooperative are not always subject to deregulation). The Texas Interconnection is the statewide grid, managed by the Electric Reliability Council of Texas (ERCOT).

Major transmission operators include Oncor Electric Delivery and CenterPoint Energy, with additional companies including Entergy Texas and AEP Texas. Prices for transmission and distribution, as opposed to generation, have risen relatively. In most areas of Texas, consumers can choose their generating provider, but as of 2017 there were areas with limited to no competition.

=== Renewables ===
Texas is a leader in alternative energy sources, producing the most wind power of any state, as well as small solar powered efforts and the experimental installation of wave powered generators.

==== Wind ====
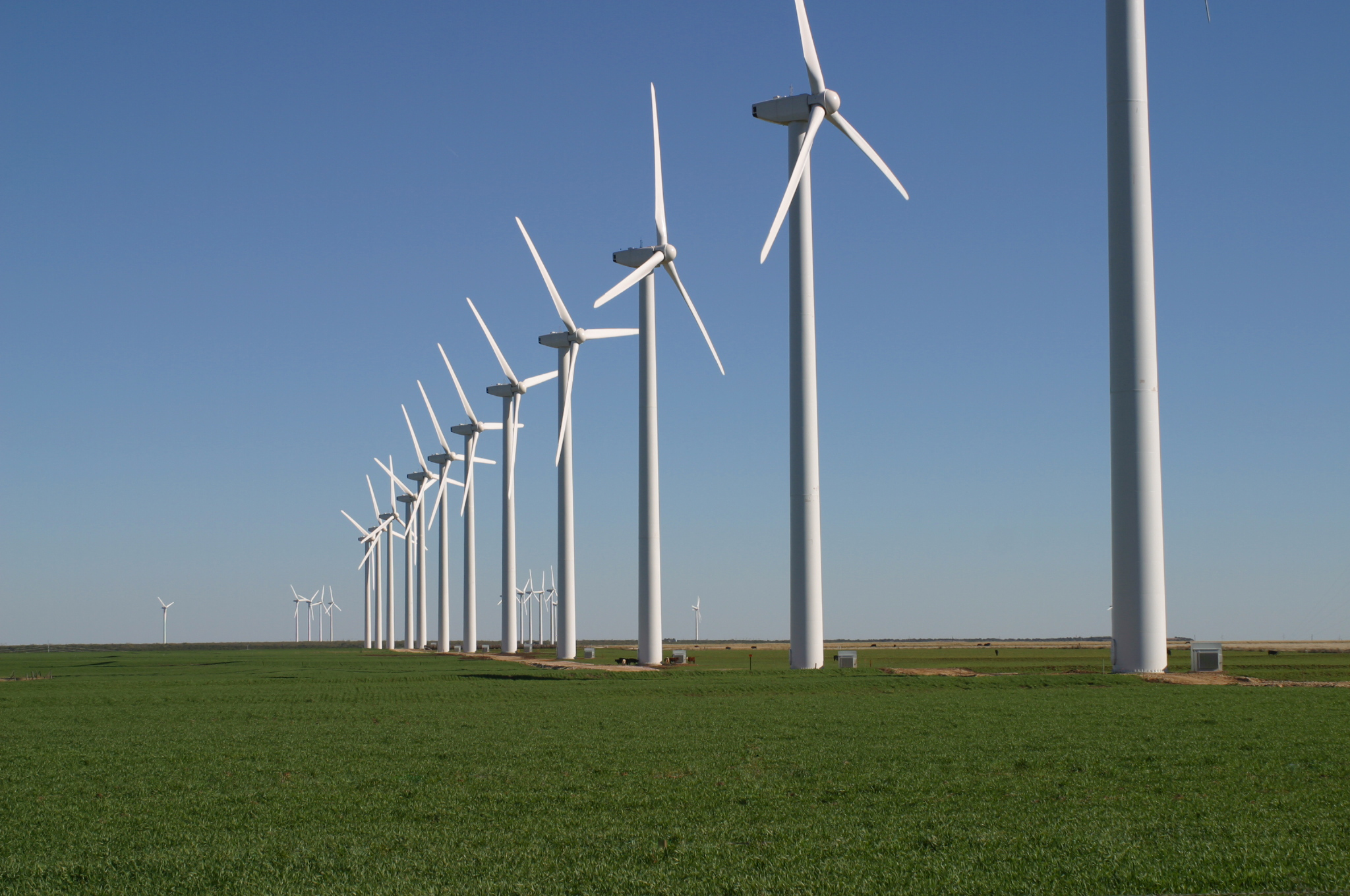
Brazos Wind Farm, Fluvanna, 2004

Texas has over 150 wind farms, which together have a total nameplate capacity of over 30,000 MW (as of 2020). If Texas were a country, it would rank fifth in the world: The installed wind capacity in Texas exceeds installed wind capacity in all countries but China, the United States, Germany and India. Texas produces the most wind power of any U.S. state. According to the Electric Reliability Council of Texas (ERCOT), wind power accounted for at least 15.7% of the electricity generated in Texas during 2017. ERCOT set a new wind output record of nearly 19.7 GW on January 21, 2019.

==== Solar ====
The western portion of the state especially has abundant open land areas, with some of the greatest solar and wind potential in the country. Development activities there are also encouraged by relatively simple permitting and significant available transmission capacity. Some solar parks also host batteries, while other batteries are only connected to the grid. Texas has 5.7 GW batteries, and most of them earn most of their annual income on 15 days of extreme weather per year, and from arbitrage and grid services.

== Fossil fuel production ==
Texas is the largest state producer of both crude oil and natural gas, producing 41% of national crude oil production and 25% of national natural gas in 2019. The thirty oil refineries operating in January 2019 comprised 31% of national refining capacity.

=== Petroleum ===
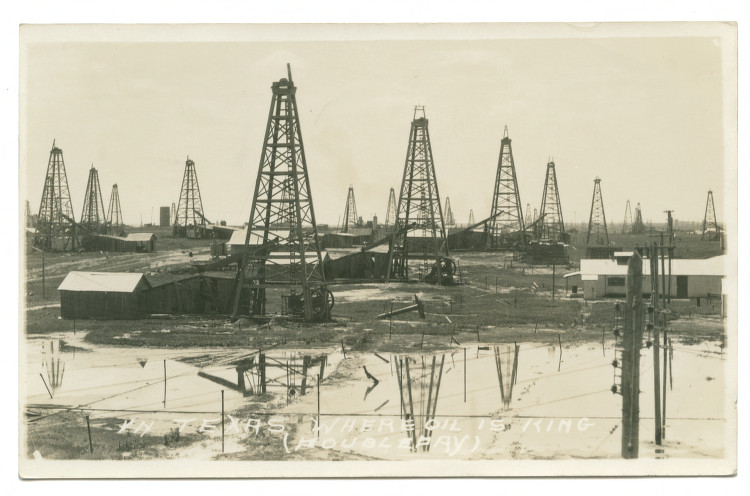
Oil field in McCamey, ca. 1930

The known petroleum deposits of Texas are about 8 billion barrels (1.3×10^{9} m^{3}), which makes up approximately one-third of the known U.S. supply. Texas has 4.6 billion barrels (730,000,000 m^{3}) of proven crude oil reserves. As wells are depleted in the eastern portions of the state, drilling in state has moved westward.

Several of the major oil companies have headquarters in Texas, including BP (Houston), ConocoPhillips, Marathon Oil (Houston), Exxon-Mobil (Spring), Tesoro, and Valero (San Antonio).

Texas also is home to many of the world's largest oilfield services firms including Halliburton, Schlumberger and Dresser. The state has a number of pipeline operators, such as El Paso and Dynegy, along with diversified energy firms such as TXU and Reliant Energy.

== History ==
On the morning of January 10, 1901, Anthony F. Lucas, an experienced mining engineer, drilled the first major oil well at Spindletop, a small hill south of Beaumont, Texas. The East Texas Oil Field, discovered on October 5, 1930, is located in east central part of the state, and is the largest and most prolific oil reservoir in the contiguous United States. Other oil fields were later discovered in West Texas and under the Gulf of Mexico. The resulting Texas Oil Boom permanently transformed the economy of Texas, and led to its most significant economic expansion after the American Civil War.

Following the December 1989 United States cold wave, which resulted in rolling blackouts and "near loss of the entire ERCOT electric grid", the Public Utility Commission of Texas recommended winterizing the state's energy infrastructure. However, this recommendation was not acted upon. Consequently, the 2011 Groundhog Day blizzard resulting in rolling blackouts and failing power plants throughout the state.

The 2021 Texas power crisis involved mass power outages, water and food shortages, and dangerous weather conditions. The crisis was the result of several severe winter storms sweeping across the United States on February 10–11 and 13–17. More than 3.6 million Texans were without power, some for several days. The cause of the power outages was initially blamed on frozen wind turbines by some government officials, including Texas governor Greg Abbott, but frozen natural gas lines were likely the main cause.

== See also ==
- Energy law
- United States energy law
- United States energy policy
