= Wind power in Texas =

Electricity from wind in one U.S. state

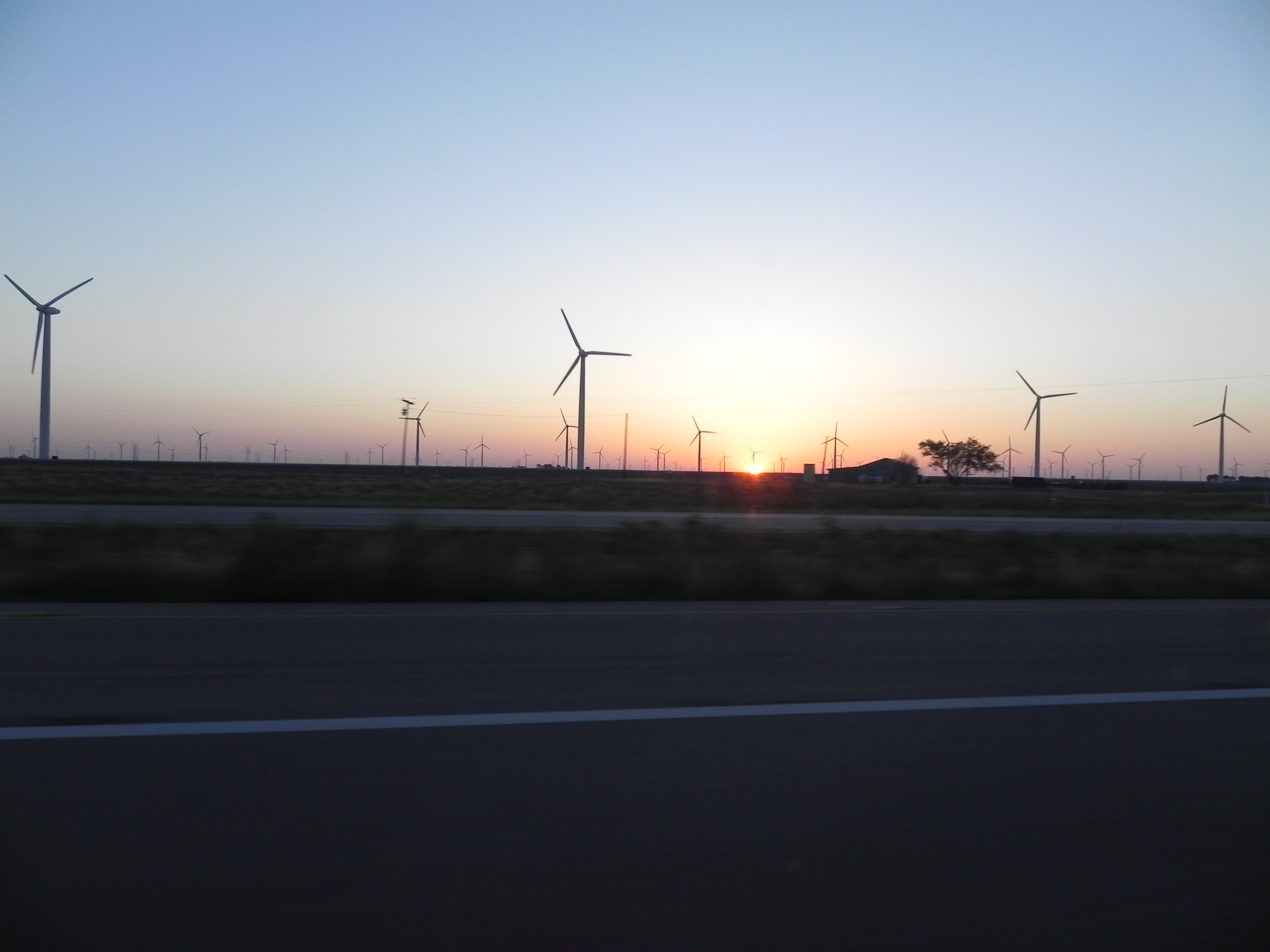
The 781 MW Roscoe Wind Farm at sunrise

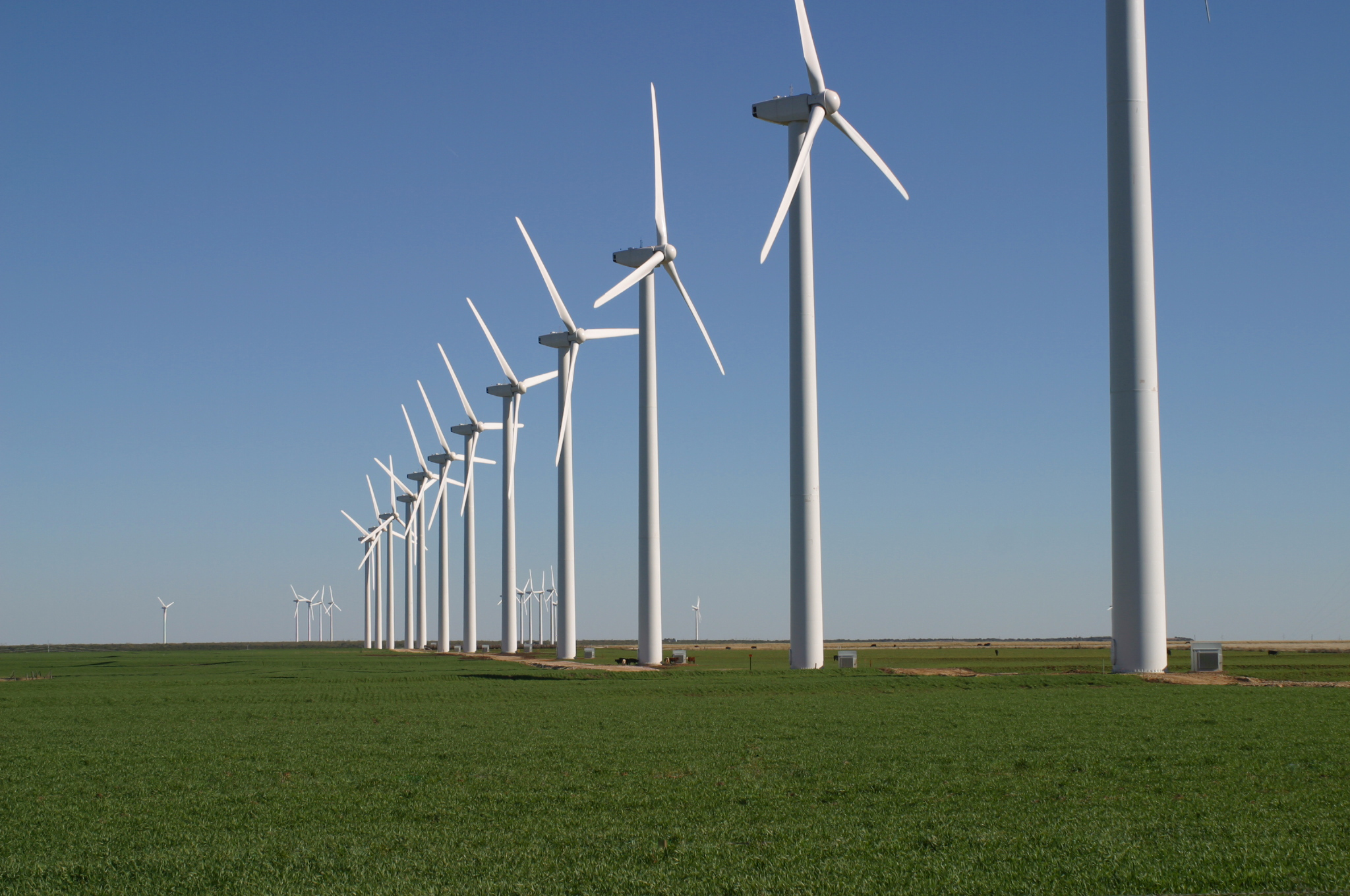
Brazos Wind Ranch

Wind power in Texas, a portion of total energy in Texas, consists of 198 wind farms, which together have a total nameplate capacity of over 40,000 MW (as of 2026). Texas produces the most wind power of any U.S. state. Furthermore, if Texas were a country, in 2019, it would have ranked fifth in the world in terms of gigawatt capacity. According to the Electric Reliability Council of Texas (ERCOT), wind power in 2025 accounted for 22.4% of electricity generated in ERCOT, which manages 90% of Texas's power. Due to steadily increasing installed capacity, ERCOT regularly sets wind output records, mostly recently passing 29 GW on June 29, 2026.

The wind resource in many parts of Texas is very large. Farmers may lease their land to wind developers, creating a new revenue stream for the farm. The wind power industry has also created over 24,000 jobs for local communities and for the state. Texas is seen as a profit-driven leader of renewable energy commercialization in the United States. The wind boom in Texas was assisted by expansion of the state's Renewable Portfolio Standard, use of designated Competitive Renewable Energy Zones, expedited transmission construction, and the necessary Public Utility Commission rule-making.

The Los Vientos Wind Farm (912 MW) in South Texas, is the state's largest wind farm. Other large wind farms in Texas include Roscoe Wind Farm, Horse Hollow Wind Energy Center, Sherbino Wind Farm, Capricorn Ridge Wind Farm, Sweetwater Wind Farm, Buffalo Gap Wind Farm, King Mountain Wind Farm, Desert Sky Wind Farm, Wildorado Wind Ranch, and the Brazos Wind Farm.

== Overview ==
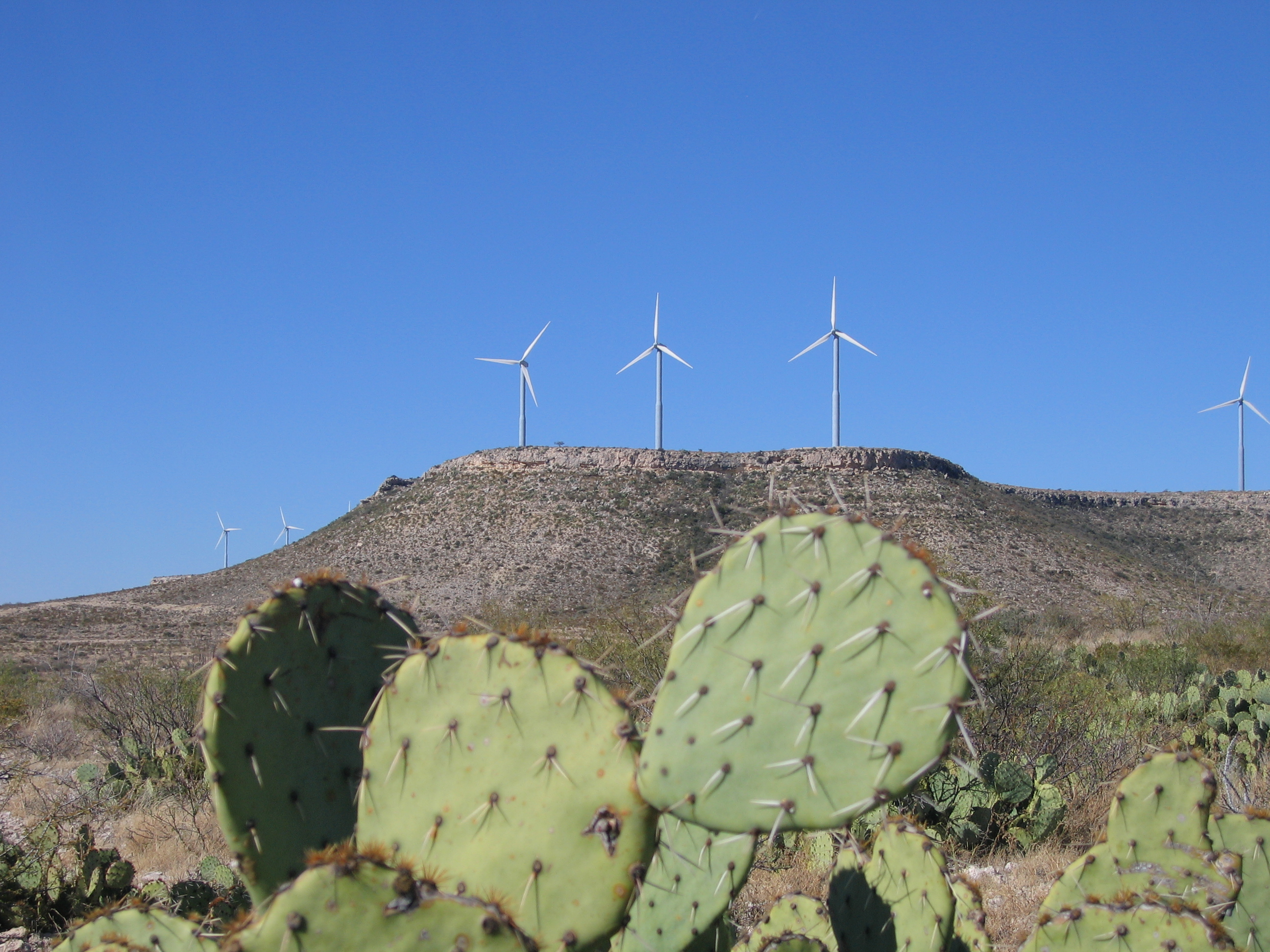
Part of the Desert Sky Wind Farm off I-10

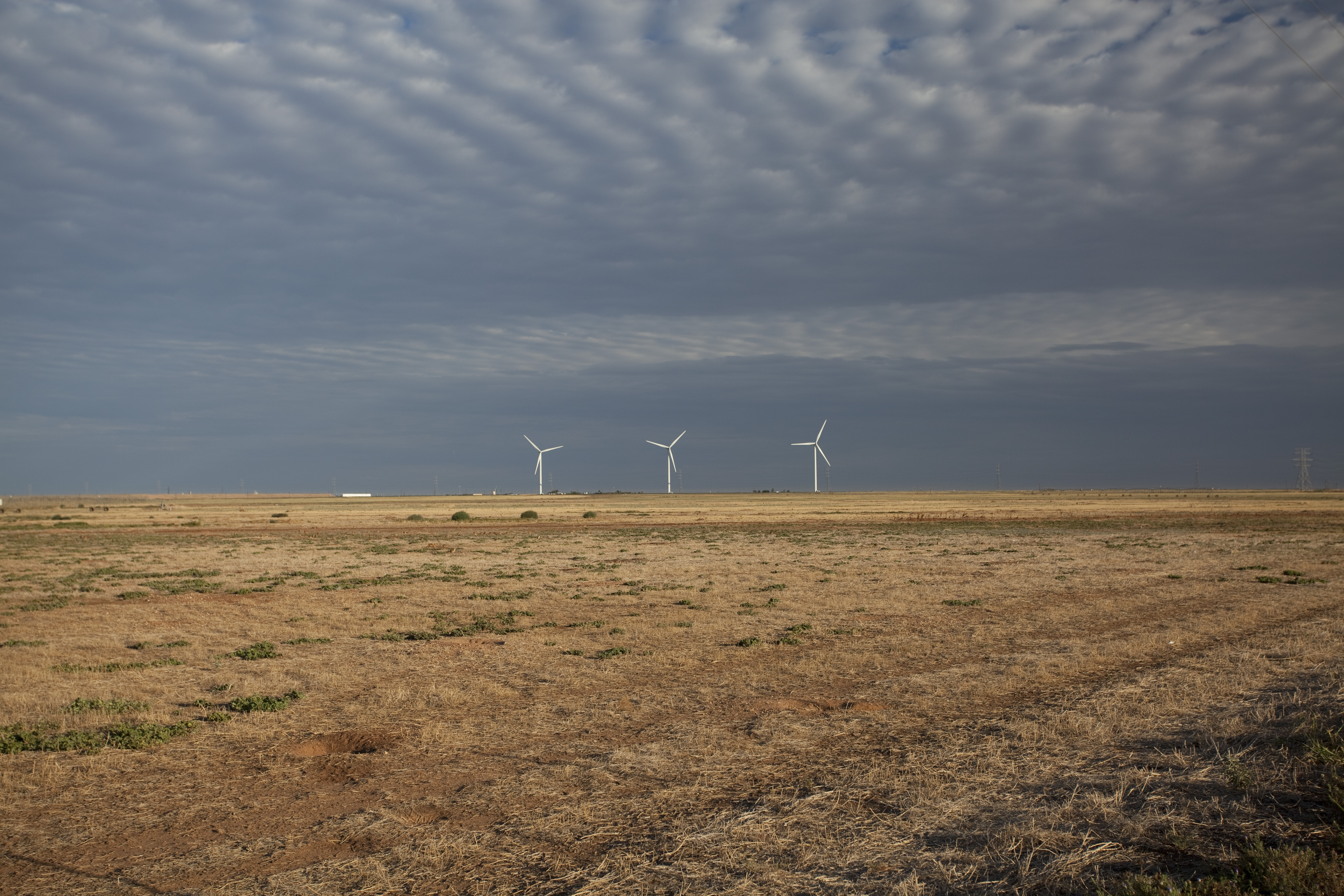
Wind turbines on the windswept high plains of the Llano Estacado, Lubbock County

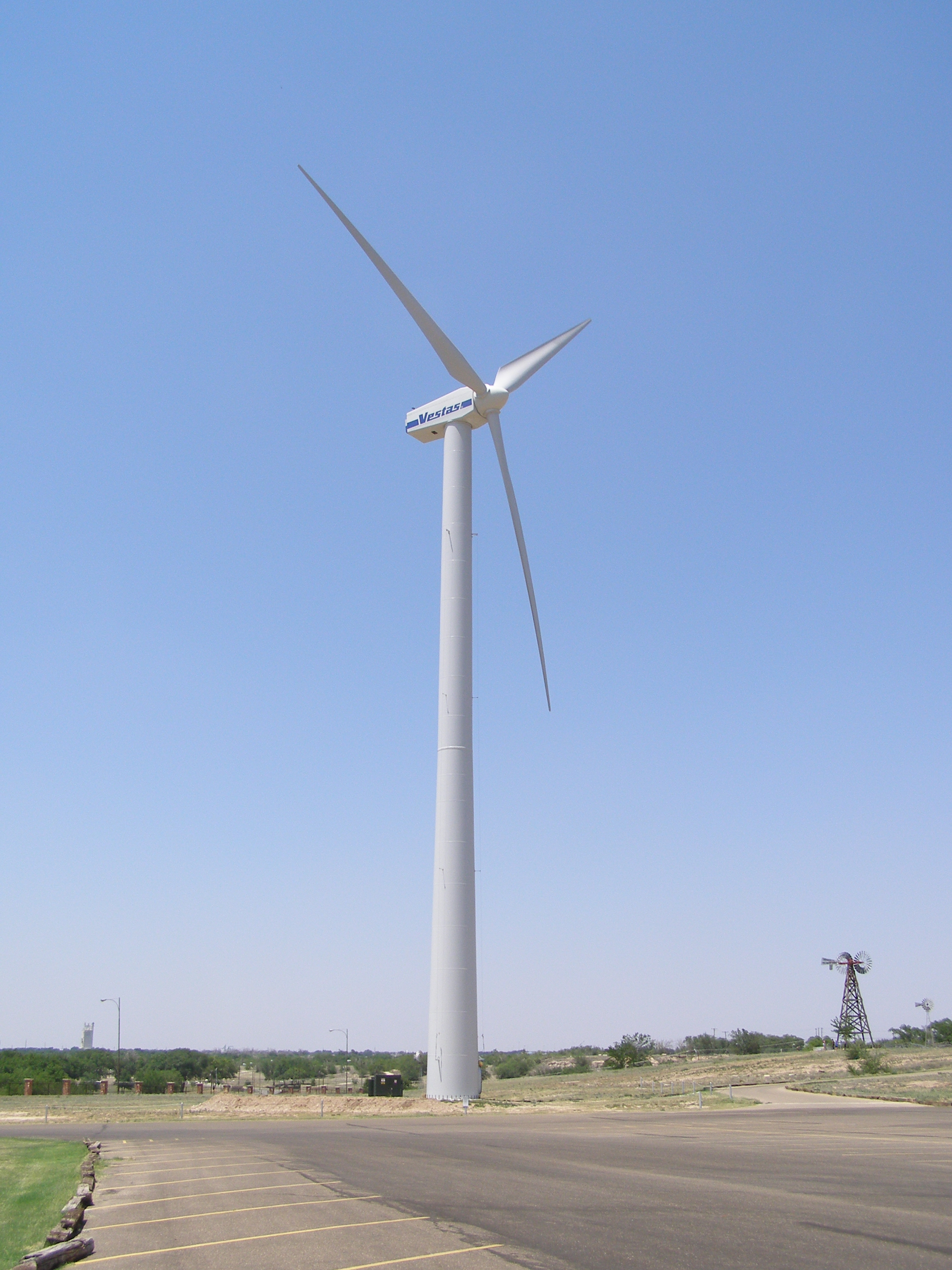
Vestas V47-660kW wind turbine at American Wind Power Center in Lubbock

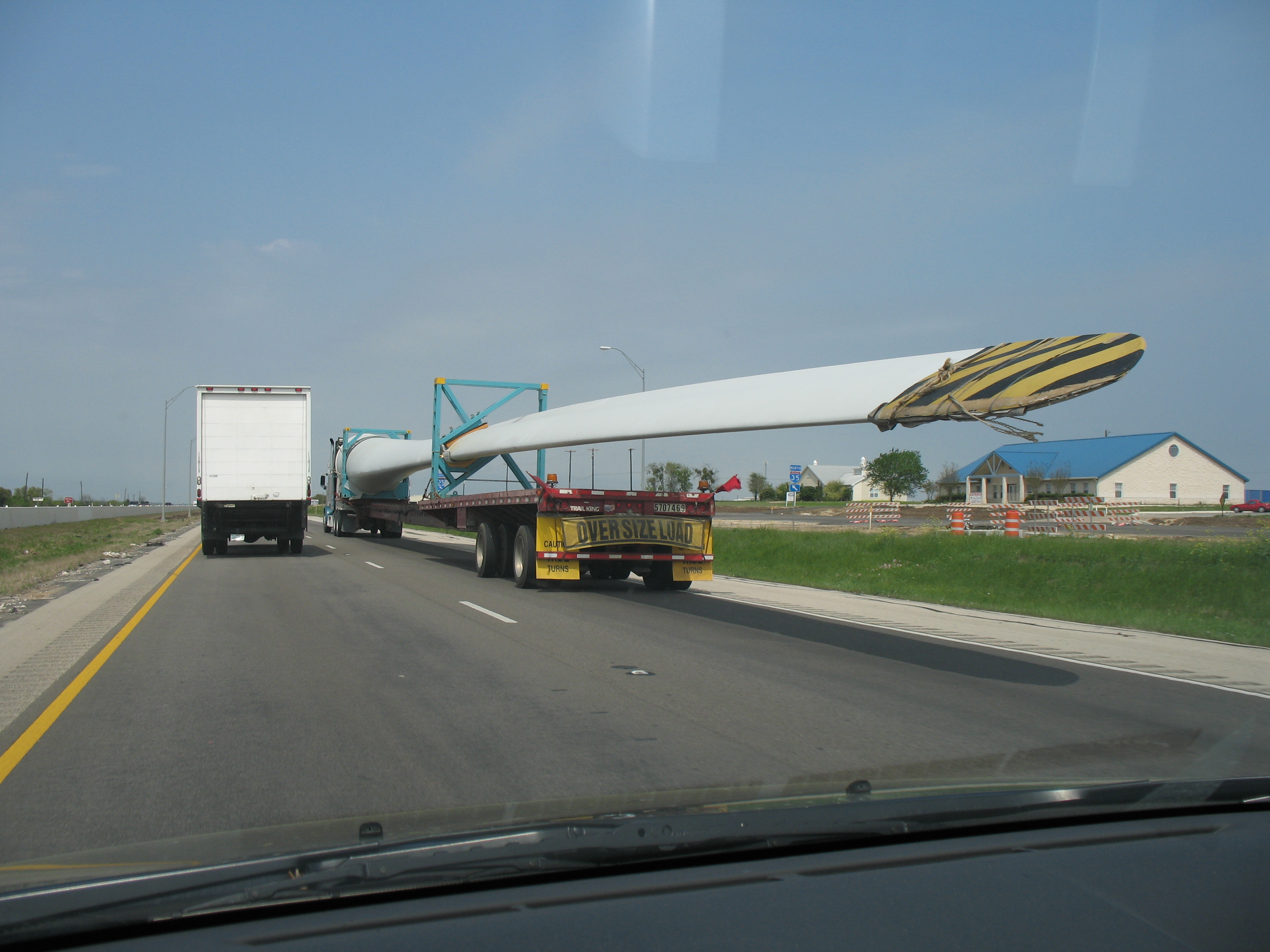
A wind turbine blade on I-35 near Elm Mott, an increasingly common sight in Texas

Wind power has a long history in Texas. West Texas A&M University began wind energy research in 1970 and led to the formation of the Alternative Energy Institute (AEI) in 1977. AEI has been a major information resource about wind energy for Texas. The first 80-meter tower was erected at Big Spring, Texas in 1999.

Several forces are driving the growth of wind power in Texas: favorable wind resources and land availability, State targets for renewable energy, cost efficiency of development and operation of wind farms, and a suitable electric transmission grid. The broad scope and geographical extent of wind farms in Texas is considerable: wind resource areas lie in the Texas Panhandle, along the Gulf coast south of Galveston, and in the mountain passes and ridge tops of the Trans-Pecos in the western tip of Texas. In 2012 over 10,700 wind turbines were operating in Texas to generate electricity, but 80,000 windmills were pumping water, indicating the amount of growth potential remaining for wind power generation.

Wind power is a for-profit enterprise between land owners and wind farm operators. Texas farmers can lease their land to wind developers for either a set rental per turbine or for a small percentage of gross annual revenue from the project. This offers farmers a fresh revenue stream without impacting traditional farming and grazing practices. Although leasing arrangements vary widely, the United States Government Accountability Office reported in 2004 that a farmer who leases land to a wind project developer can generally obtain royalties of $3,000 to $5,000 per turbine per year in lease payments. These figures are rising as larger wind turbines are being produced and installed.

Wind power offers a reliability benefit in that its generation (though not its transmission) is highly decentralized. Sabotage and industrial accidents can be potential threats to the large, centrally located, power plants that provide most of Texas’ electricity. Should one of these plants be damaged, repairs could take more than a year, possibly creating power shortages on a scale that Texans have never experienced before. Coal trains and gas pipelines are also vulnerable to disruption. However, wind power plants are quickly installed and repaired. The modular structure of a wind farm also means that if one turbine is damaged, the overall output of the plant is not significantly affected.

Wind is a highly variable resource. With proper understanding and planning, it can be incorporated into an electric utility's generation mix, although it clearly does not provide the sort of on-demand availability that gas power stations provide.

Many areas in Texas have wind conditions allowing for development of wind power generation. The number of commercially attractive sites has expanded as wind turbine technology has improved and development costs continue to drop. (→ Cost of electricity by source#United States) Particularly in southern Texas, the difference between land and off-shore air temperatures creates convection currents that generate significant winds during the middle of the day when electricity usage is typically at its peak level. Although these winds are less than in West Texas, they occur more predictably, more in correlation with consumption, and closer to consumers. Several wind farms have been developed at the Texas coast, to a combined 3,000 MW.

Starting in 2008, the wind power development boom in Texas outstripped the capacity of the transmission systems in place, and predicted shortages in transmission capability could have dampened the growth of the industry. Until 2008, the growth in wind power "piggybacked" on existing lines, but had almost depleted spare capacity. As a result, in winter the west Texas grid often had such a local surplus of power, that the price would fall below zero. According to Michael Goggin, electric industry analyst at AWEA, "Prices fell below US −$30/MWh (megawatt-hour) on 63% of days during the first half of 2008, compared to 10% for the same period in 2007 and 5% in 2006."

Curtailment in Texas

In July 2008, utility officials gave preliminary approval to a $4.9 billion plan to build new transmission lines to carry wind-generated electricity from West Texas to urban areas such as Dallas. The new plan would be the biggest investment in renewable energy in U.S. history, and would add transmission lines capable of moving about 18,000 megawatts. ERCOT curtailed wind power by 17% (3.8 TWh) in 2009, but that decreased to only 0.5% by 2014, as transmission improved, particularly the Competitive Renewable Energy Zone (CREZ) in 2013. However the CREZ lines are sometimes maxed out, and in November 2015, prices were negative for 50 hours.

In an early morning period of low electricity demand, wind energy served more than 56% of total demand on the ERCOT grid at 3:10 am Central Standard Time on Saturday, January 19, 2019. Two days later, ERCOT set a new wind output record of nearly 19.7GW at 7:19 pm Central Standard Time on Monday, January 21, 2019.

In areas where smart metering is commonly installed, some utilities offer free electricity at night.

In 2020, wind power surpassed coal in the total electricity balance of the state for the first time, "the newest sign of the growing popularity of the renewable energy in fossil fuel heartland of America," as reported by the Financial Times.

== Location map ==
Large wind power projects in Texas
Operating
Under construction
Proposed
Major cities

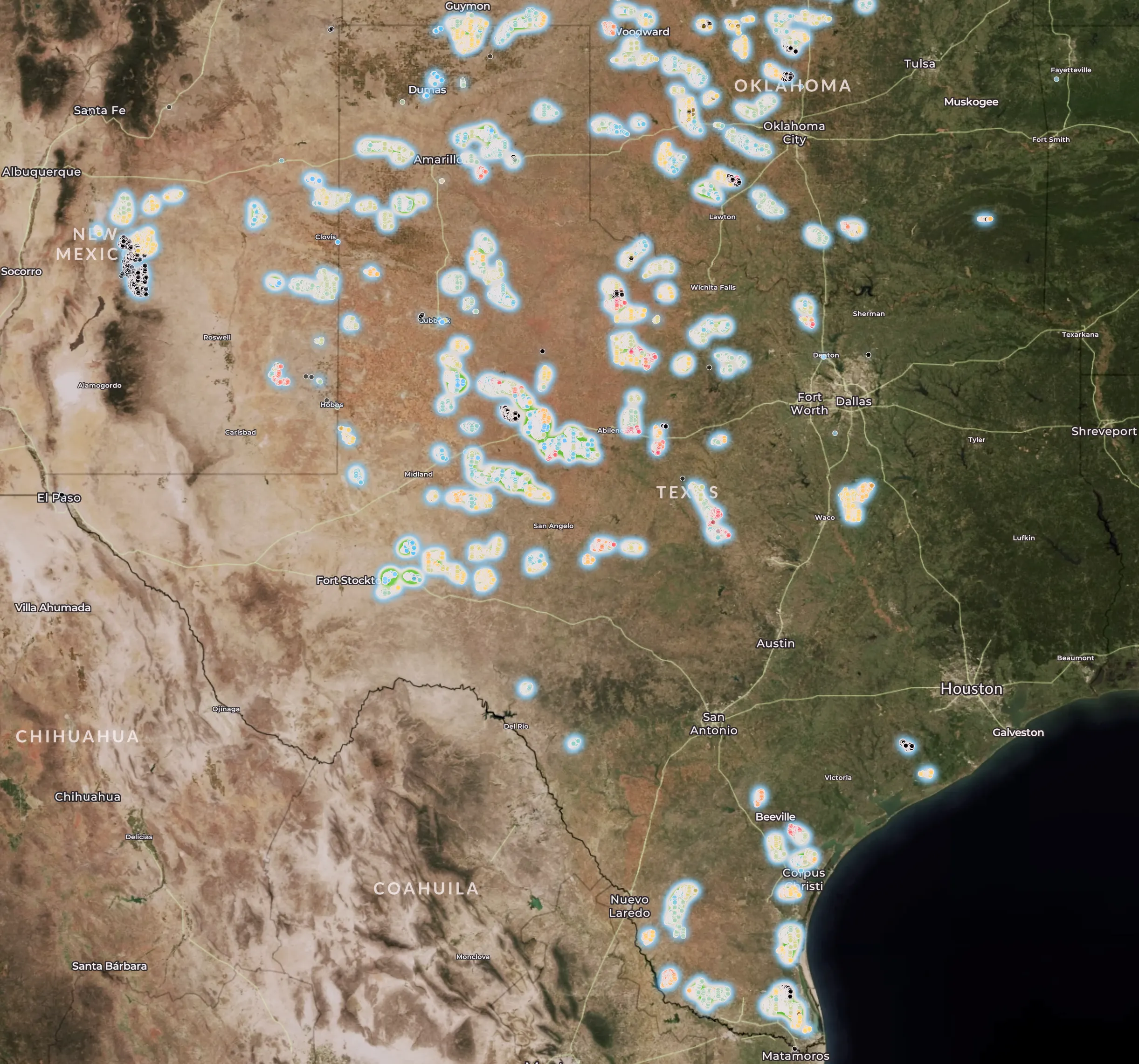
Texas wind power map

== Renewable Portfolio Standard ==
After years of preparation, the Texas Renewable Portfolio Standard was originally created by Senate Bill 7 and signed by Governor Bush in 1999, which helped Texas eventually become the leading producer of wind powered electricity in the U.S. The RPS was part of new laws that restructured the electricity industry. The Texas RPS mandated that utility companies jointly create 2000 megawatts (MW) of new renewable energy by 2009 based on their market share. In 2005, Senate Bill 20, increased the state's RPS requirement to 5,880 MW by 2015, of which, 500 MW must come from non-wind resources. The bill set a goal of 10,000 MW of renewable energy capacity for 2025, which was achieved 15 years early, in 2010.

According to DSIRE.org, "In 1999 the Public Utility Commission of Texas (PUCT) adopted rules for the state's Renewable Energy Mandate, establishing a renewable portfolio standard (RPS), a renewable-energy credit (REC) trading program, and renewable-energy purchase requirements for competitive retailers in Texas. The 1999 standard called for 2,000 megawatts (MW) of new renewables to be installed in Texas by 2009, in addition to the 880 MW of existing renewables generation at the time. In August 2005, S.B. 20 increased the renewable-energy mandate to 5,880 MW by 2015 (about 5% of the state's electricity demand), including a target of 500 MW of renewable-energy capacity from resources other than wind. Wind accounts for nearly all of the current renewable-energy generation in Texas. The 2005 legislation also set a target of reaching 10,000 MW of renewable energy capacity by 2025.

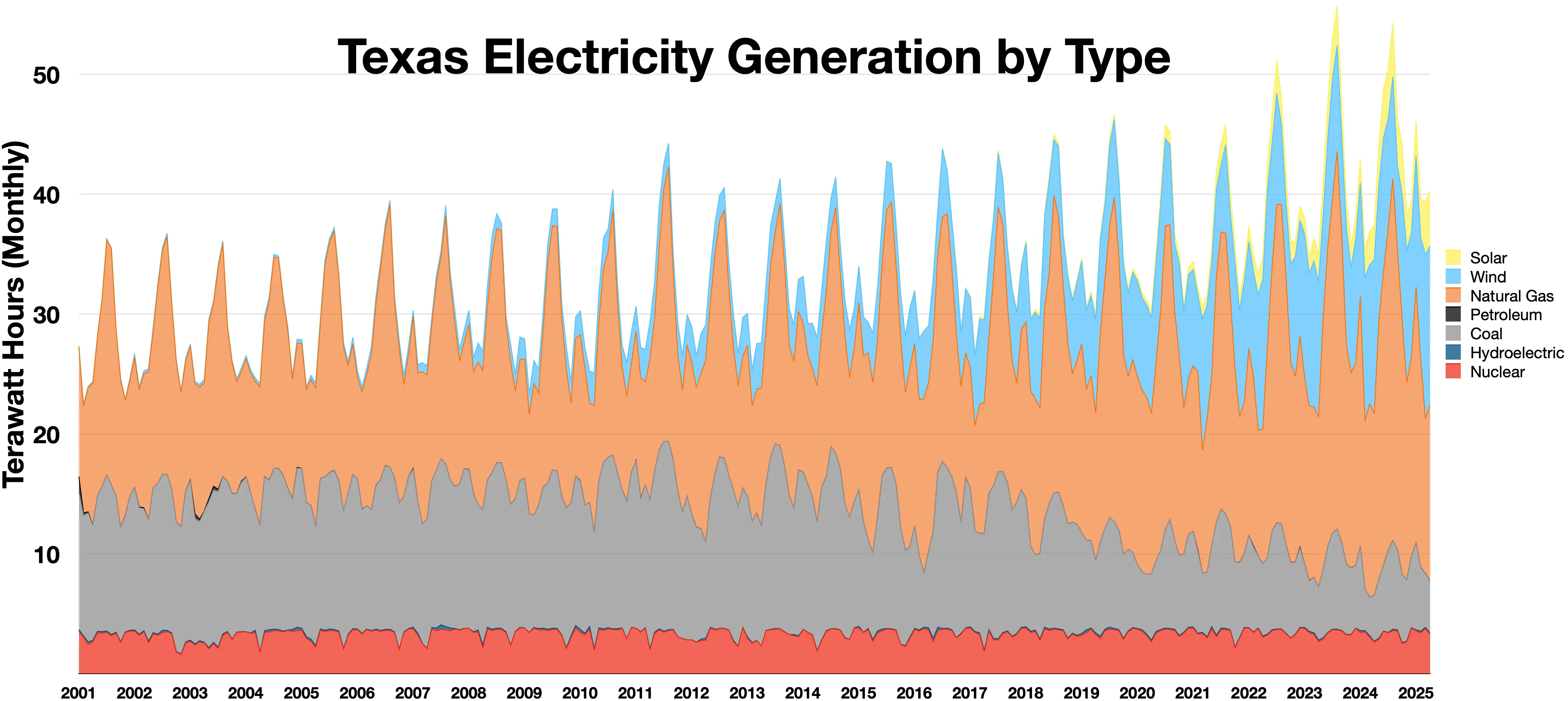
Texas electricity generation by type

In 2018, wind power was the third-largest source of electricity generation in Texas. In 2020, it surpassed coal as the second-largest source, as previously projected.

Qualifying renewable energy sources include solar, wind, geothermal, hydroelectric, wave or tidal energy, biomass, or biomass-based waste products, including landfill gas. Qualifying systems are those installed after September 1999. The RPS applies to all investor-owned utilities. Municipal and cooperative utilities may voluntarily elect to offer customer choice.

The PUCT established a renewable-energy credit (REC) trading program that began in July 2001 and will continue through 2019. Under PUCT rules, one REC represents one megawatt-hour (MWh) of qualified renewable energy that is generated and metered in Texas. A capacity conversion factor (CCF) is used to convert MW goals into MWh requirements for each retailer in the competitive market. The CCF was originally administratively set at 35% for the first two compliance years, but is now based on the actual performance of the resources in the REC-trading program for the previous two years. For the 2010 and 2011 the CCF will be 30.5%." Each retailer in Texas is allocated a share of the mandate based on that retailer’s pro rata share of statewide retail energy sales. The program administrator maintains a REC account for program participants to track the production, sale, transfer, purchase, and retirement of RECs. Credits can be banked for three years, and all renewable additions have a minimum of 10 years of credits to recover over-market costs. An administrative penalty of $50 per MWh was established for providers that do not meet the RPS requirements.

== Future developments ==
Like several Texas solar plants, some Texas wind power plants include storage, with more projects under construction. One of the first such energy storage systems started as 36 MW in Notrees in December 2012. The system allows excess wind energy to be stored, making the output more predictable and less variable.

If developed, the Tres Amigas HVDC link to the Western grid and the Eastern grid could allow more flexibility in importing and exporting power to and from Texas.

A 300 MW offshore wind farm is planned for Galveston, and 2,100 MW for the Gulf Coast of Texas. Making turbines that are able to yaw quickly could make them more likely to be able to survive a hurricane.

== Statistics ==
Texas wind generation capacity by year (MW)
Megawatts of installed generating capacity

Texas wind generation by year (MWh x 1000)
Thousand megawatt hours of generation

Texas wind generation (GWh, million kWh)
Year	Total	Jan	Feb	Mar	Apr	May	Jun	Jul	Aug	Sep	Oct	Nov	Dec
2001	1,187	84	142	88	115	103	92	76	56	76	123	89	143
2002	2,656	287	195	238	237	264	258	218	248	164	173	170	204
2003	2,569	171	190	215	260	209	213	240	193	196	168	228	286
2004	3,137	253	251	293	305	393	289	221	160	209	212	238	313
2005	4,238	312	209	350	432	385	451	309	261	315	348	325	541
2006	6,671	535	425	552	605	632	488	472	358	501	669	766	668
2007	9,007	498	712	757	798	596	577	436	867	741	1,057	944	1,024
2008	16,224	1,150	1,180	1,581	1,596	1,683	1,748	1,222	647	638	1,455	1,433	1,891
2009	20,026	1,656	1,719	1,905	2,028	1,520	1,613	1,394	1,458	1,218	1,933	1,802	1,780
2010	26,251	1,983	1,672	2,666	2,731	2,337	2,562	1,863	1,658	1,589	1,830	2,765	2,595
2011	30,547	2,064	2,528	2,689	3,066	3,099	3,357	2,085	1,955	1,694	2,671	2,832	2,507
2012	32,214	3,057	2,599	3,341	2,969	2,841	2,615	2,115	1,872	2,174	2,742	2,643	3,246
2013	36,415	2,656	2,984	3,810	3,761	3,963	3,379	2,938	2,130	2,005	3,082	3,030	2,677
2014	40,005	3,916	2,656	3,771	3,997	3,518	4,209	2,770	2,551	2,320	2,981	3,994	3,322
2015	44,883	3,031	3,268	2,544	4,099	4,371	3,411	4,059	3,218	3,465	3,661	4,772	4,984
2016	57,530	4,451	5,120	5,635	4,737	5,173	3,782	5,675	3,702	3,915	5,451	4,516	5,373
2017	67,061	5,873	5,828	7,095	6,929	6,310	4,839	4,511	3,694	4,754	6,003	5,895	5,330
2018	75,700	6,602	6,041	7,210	7,477	7,672	7,689	4,647	5,968	4,165	5,599	6,074	6,556
2019	83,621	6,925	6,639	6,694	7,839	7,762	6,290	6,731	6,489	6,517	7,455	6,990	7,290
2020	92,439	7,976	7,714	7,699	7,950	8,314	8,859	7,276	6,689	5,522	7,838	7,981	8,621
2021	99,474	8,036	6,386	10,970	9,518	9,557	7,228	5,599	7,375	6,985	8,850	8,849	10,121
2022	114,786	8,866	8,809	11,319	12,494	13,017	10,257	9,276	6,668	6,217	8,218	9,998	9,647
2023	119,856	11,991	11,071	12,164	11,284	8,515	8,984	9,989	8,835	8,138	9,754	8,780	10,351
2024	124,277	9,490	12,038	11,444	12,816	11,277	11,167	9,125	8,464	6,864	10,450	10,893	10,249
2025	129,456	10,861	10,151	13,576	13,380	10,530	11,575	10,547	8,279	7,570	10,135	11,114	11,738
2026	85,298	11,153	11,021	15,131	13,232	11,101	12,964	10,696					

Teal background indicates the largest wind generation month for the year.
Green background indicates the largest wind generation month to date.

Texas wind generation in 2012

Texas wind generation in 2013

Texas wind generation in 2014

Texas wind generation in 2015

== See also ==
- Electricity sector of the United States
- Renewable energy in the United States
- Wind power in the United States
- List of wind farms in the United States
- List of large wind farms
- United States Wind Energy Policy
- Deregulation of the Texas electricity market
- Public Utility Commission of Texas
- Electric Reliability Council of Texas
- Solar power in Texas
