= Solar power in Texas =

Overview of solar power in the U.S. state of Texas

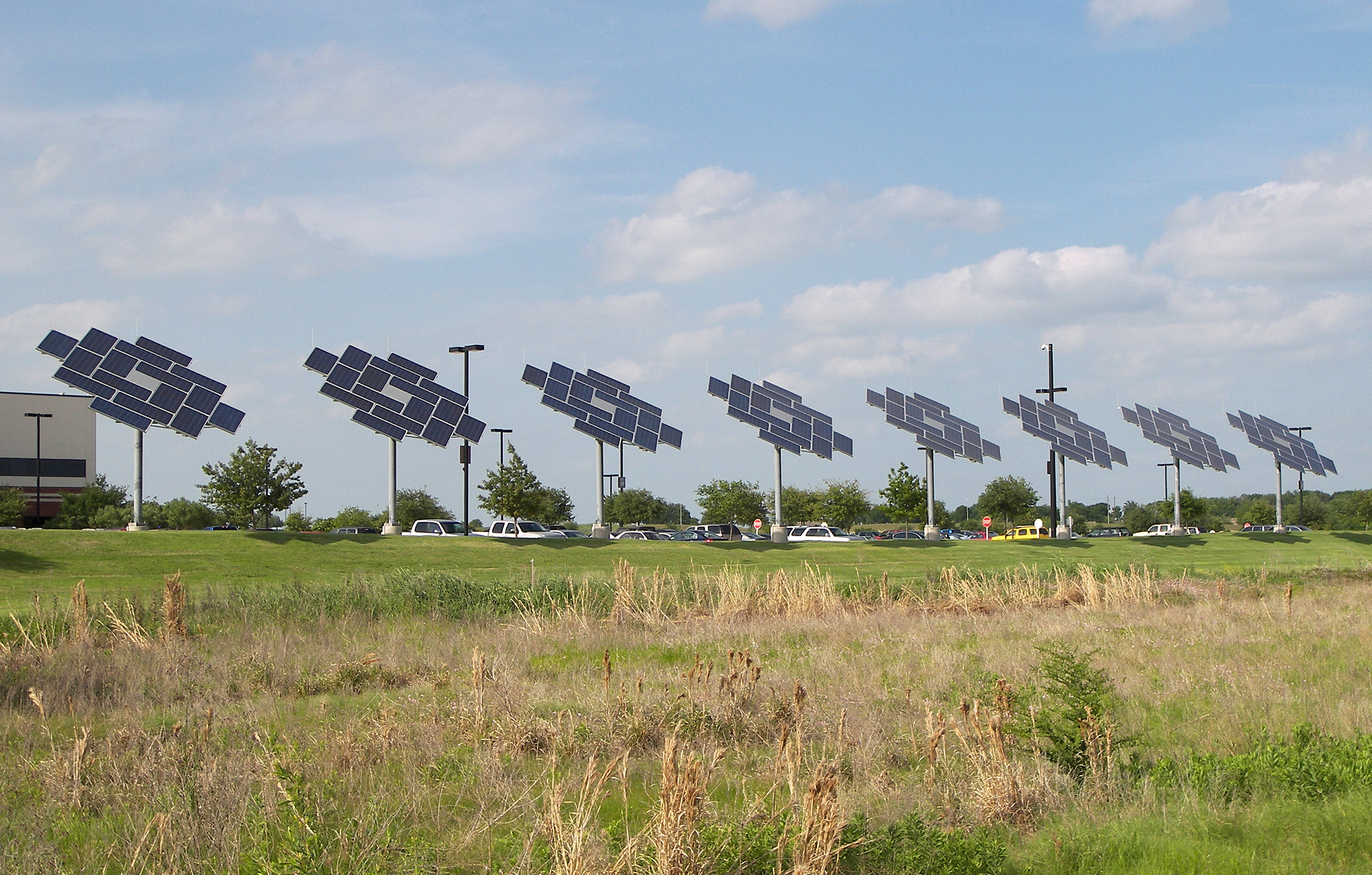
Solar array in Austin

Solar power in Texas, a portion of total energy in Texas, includes utility-scale solar power plants as well as local distributed generation, mostly from rooftop photovoltaics. The western portion of the state especially has abundant open land areas, with some of the greatest solar and wind potential in the country. Development activities there are also encouraged by relatively simple permitting and significant available transmission capacity.

According to the U.S. Energy Information Administration, Texas has continued to rapidly expand its utility-scale solar capacity into the 2020s, leading the nation in new solar installations due to abundant land availability, strong solar resources, and extensive transmission infrastructure.

== Solar farms ==
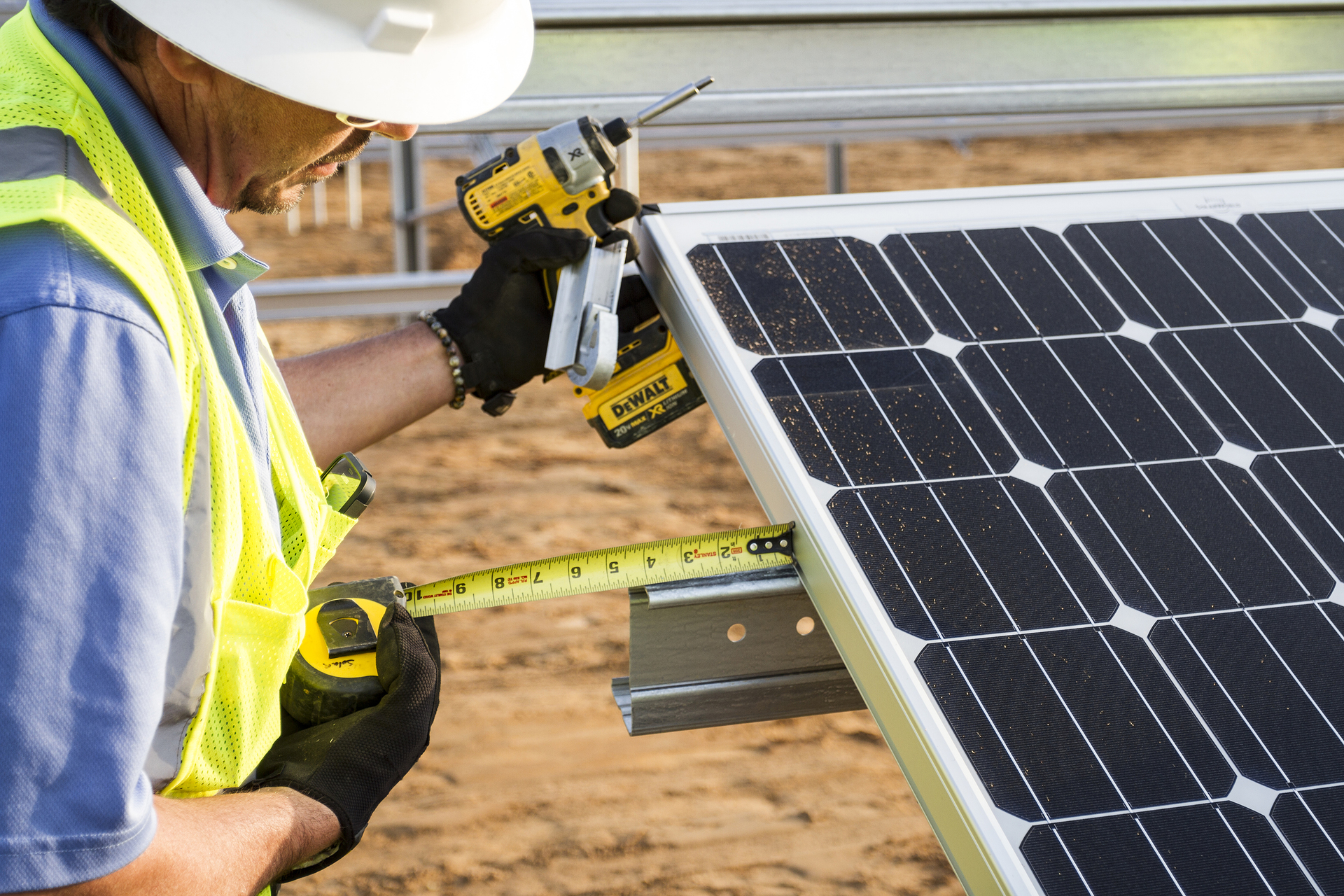
Solar panel installation, Krugerville

The capacity of large solar farms in Texas has increased substantially in recent years. Facilities sized between 5 and 50 MW began to come online throughout the state between about 2010 and 2015. Since then, progressively larger farms have been constructed in the western counties, with the electricity being contracted by utilities which serve the more populated central and eastern regions. The three largest operating facilities as of 2018 are the 180 MW Upton farm in Upton County, and the 157 MW Roserock and 154 MW Buckthorn farms in Pecos County. Smaller installations by individuals, cooperatives, and businesses are also continuing to add significant capacity, with some of top contractors in the state including Meridian Solar, Longhorn Solar, Axium Solar and Native.

== Statistic ==
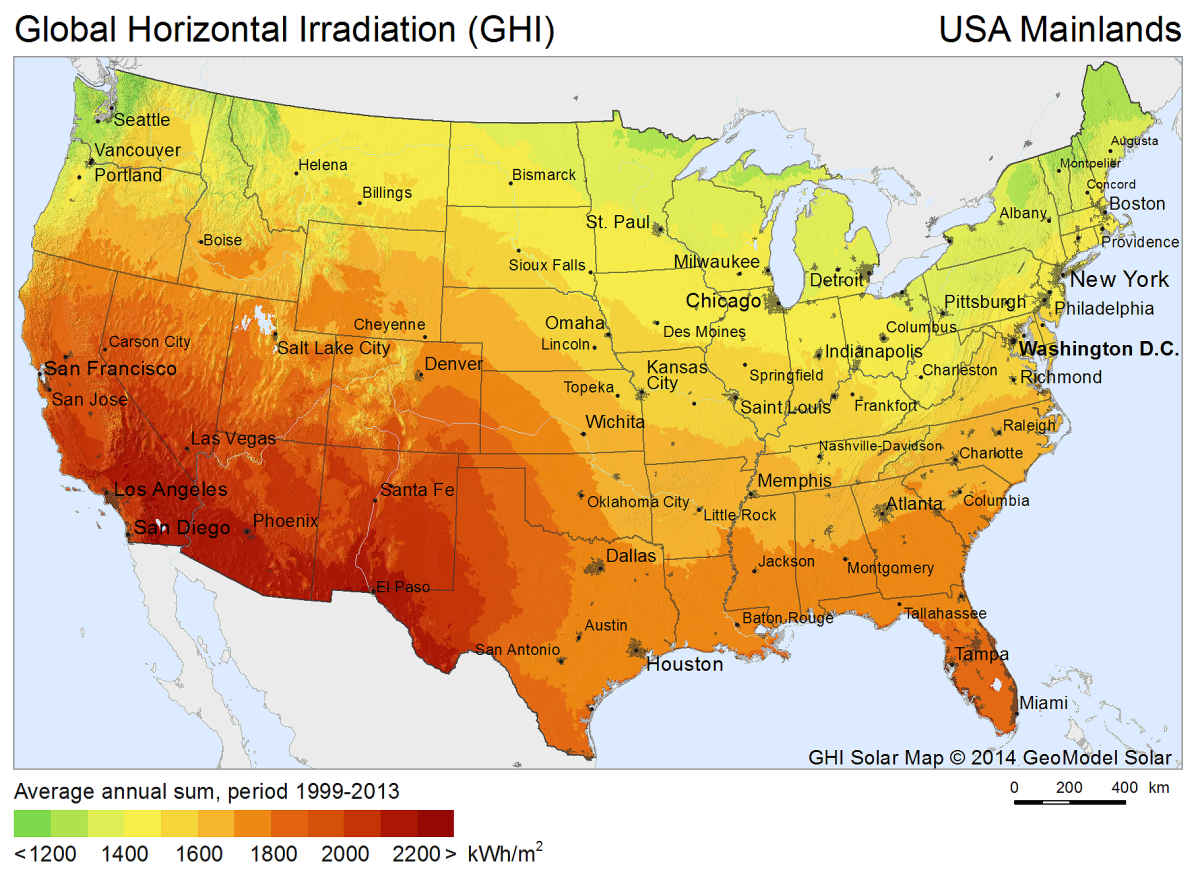
Average solar insolation

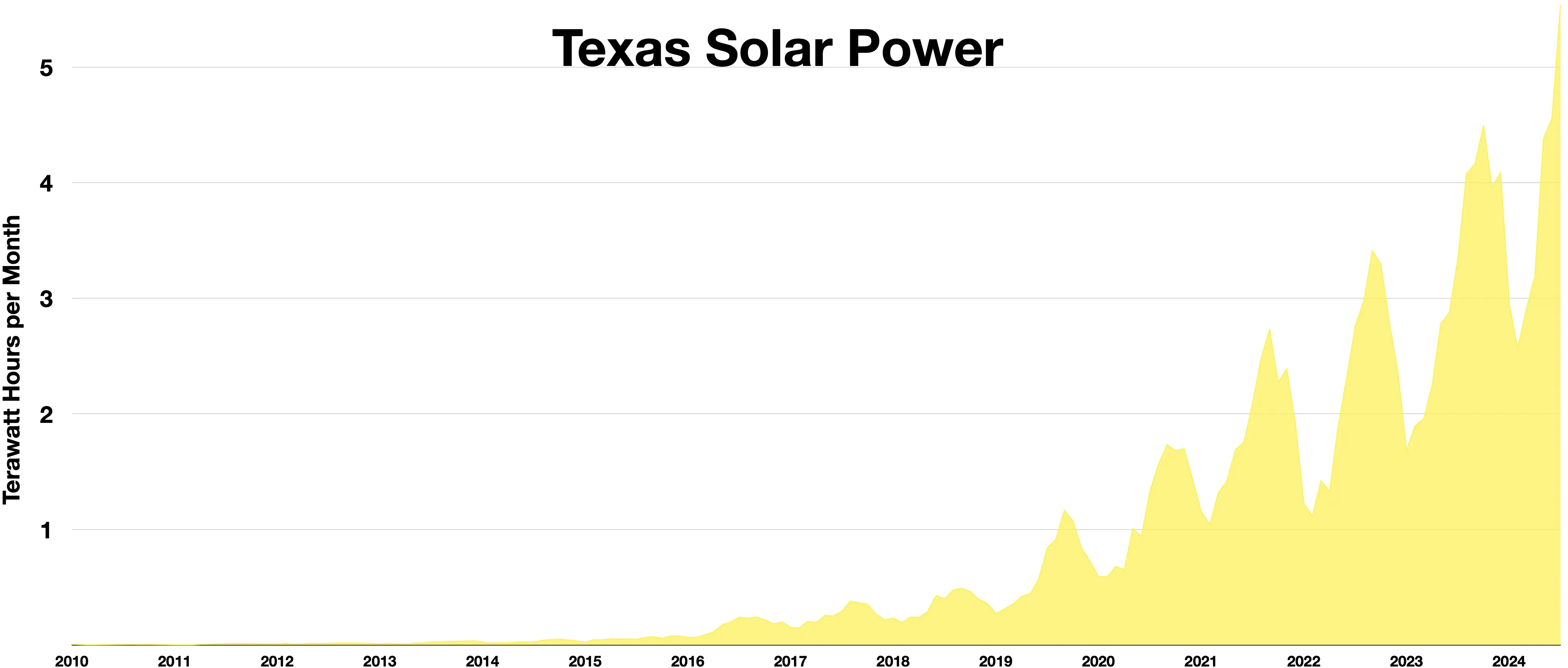
Texas solar power

=== Installed capacity ===
Grid-connected PV capacity (MW)
Year	Capacity	Change	% change
2007	3.2		
2008	4.4	1.2	38%
2009	8.6	4.2	95%
2010	34.5	25.9	301%
2011	85.6	51.1	148%
2012	140.3	54.7	64%
2013	215.9	75.6	54%
2014	387	129	79%
2015	594	207	53%
2016	1,269	675	113%
2017	1,982	713	56%
2018	2,925	943	48%
2019	4,324	1,399	48%
2020	7,785	3,460	80%
2021	13,845	6,060	78%
2022	17,247	3,402	25%
2023	22,872	5,625	33%
2024	41,460	18,588	81.27%
2025	51,902	10,442	25.19%

=== Generation ===
==== Utility-scale ====
Using data available from the U.S. Energy Information Agency's Electric Power Annual 2017 and "Electric Power Monthly Data Browser", the following tables summarize Texas's solar energy posture.

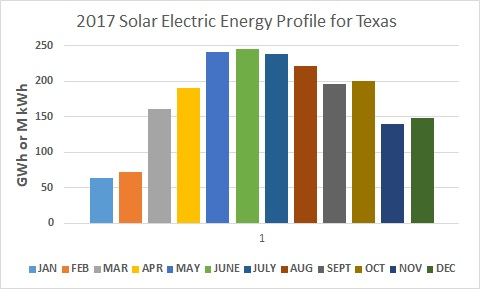
2017 Texas solar energy generation profile

Utility-scale solar capacity in Texas
Year	Facilities	Summer capacity (MW)	Capacity factor	Yearly growth of generating capacity
2018	52	1,948.2	0.196	57.1%
2017	39	1,240.2	0.201	114%
2016		578.9	0.144	82%
2015		317.9	0.144	71%
2014		185.7	0.173	

Capacity factor for each year was computed from the end-of-year summer capacity.

2018 data is from Electric Power Monthly and is subject to change.

Utility-scale solar generation in Texas (GWh)
Year	Total	% growth	% of TX renewables	% of TX total	% of US solar	Jan	Feb	Mar	Apr	May	Jun	Jul	Aug	Sep	Oct	Nov	Dec
2010	8					0	0	0	0	0	0	0	0	0	0	5	3
2011	29					1	2	2	3	3	4	3	4	3	2	1	1
2012	120					4	4	6	9	13	14	12	13	11	10	9	15
2013	163					8	10	15	12	15	16	17	18	15	14	9	14
2014	283	73%	0.70%	0.06%	1.5%	11	8	17	19	26	26	30	32	34	37	26	17
2015	401	42%	0.80%	0.09%	1.6%	20	20	25	26	26	41	47	50	43	36	22	45
2016	732	32.9%	1.2%	0.16%	2.0%	44	54	51	53	49	65	71	58	78	78	65	66
2017	2,188	199%	3.0%	0.48%	4.1%	88	113	175	199	240	231	242	218	182	201	152	147
2018	3,206	52.9%	4.1%	0.70%	5.0%	204	195	254	250	294	380	365	352	268	217	233	194
2019	4,367					241	239	289	428	398	477	491	464	396	360	272	312
2020	8,538					354	420	443	572	842	916	1,166	1,075	843	727	591	589
2021	14,137					648	647	1,002	955	1,233	1,424	1,546	1,615	1,638	1,361	1,069	999
2022	22,165					1,312	1,411	1,690	1,764	2,106	2,406	2,662	2,227	2,339	1,894	1,244	1,110
2023	32,402					1,545	1,474	2,094	2,603	3,072	3,544	3,967	3,947	3,303	2,630	1,946	2,278
2024	48,222					2,263	2,679	3,303	3,509	4,129	5,028	5,177	5,827	4,886	4,874	3,519	3,026
2025	24,067					3,340	3,689	5,181	5,388	6,549							

==== Distributed ====
Beginning with the 2014 data year, the Energy Information Administration (EIA) has estimated the distributed solar generation and distributed solar capacity. These non-utility-scale appraisals evaluate that Texas generated the following amounts of additional solar energy:

Estimated distributed solar generation in Texas
Year	Summer capacity (MW)	Electric energy (GWh or M kWh)
2020	1092.6	1612
2019	670.5	1001
2018	474.7	715
2017	309.1	476
2016	277.1	391
2015	147.2	223
2014	96	141

=== Potential ===
Covering half of the roof with 10% efficient photovoltaics is sufficient to generate all of the electricity used by an average family in Texas. Solar farms are more cost effective in West Texas, where insolation levels are greater. The US uses about 100 quadrillion British thermal units (29,000 TWh) of energy each year. This number is expected to be reduced by 50% by 2050, due to efficiency increases. Texas has the potential to generate 22,787 TWh/year, more than any other state, from 7.743 TW of concentrated solar power plants, using 34% of Texas, and 131.2 TWh/year from 97.8 GW of rooftop photovoltaic panels, 34.6% of the electricity used in the state in 2013. The 1,310-megawatt Samson Solar farm is under construction in northeastern Texas.

Texas electricity consumption in 2010 was 358.458 TWh, more than any other state, and 9.5% of the US total.

== See also ==
- Wind power in Texas
- Solar power in the United States
- Renewable energy in the United States
