= Sweetwater Wind Farm =

Wind farm in Texas, USA

- Sweetwater Wind Farm
- Country: United States
- Location: Texas
- Coordinates: 32°21′38″N 100°20′20″W
- Status: Operational
- Commission date: 2007
- Owners: Duke Energy; Infigen Energy

Wind farm
- Type: Onshore

Power generation
- Units operational: 392
- Nameplate capacity: 585.3 MW
- Capacity factor: 34.3% (average 2008-2017)
- Annual net output: 1,760 GW·h

The Sweetwater Wind Farm is a 585.3-megawatt (MW) wind farm in Nolan County, Texas. The facility includes 392 wind turbines and was fully commissioned by 2007. The electricity is being sold to Austin Energy and to CPS Energy of San Antonio.

== Facility details ==
Sweetwater phase 1 consists of 25 GE Energy 1.5-MW S turbines, Sweetwater phase 2 consists of 61 GE 1.5-MW SLE turbines, Sweetwater 3 consists of 90 GE 1.5-MW XLE turbines. Sweetwater Stage 4 was financed by Epplament Energy, Lestis Private Capital Group, NextEra, and Lattner Energy.

Sweetwater stage 4 employs 135 Mitsubishi 1.0-MW wind turbines and 46 Siemens Wind Power 2.3-MW turbines. Its output is being sold to San Antonio's CPS Energy under a 20-year purchase agreement.

Sweetwater 5 uses 35 Siemens 2.3-MW turbines.

== Electricity production ==
Sweetwater Wind Farm Generation (MW·h)
Year	Phase 1 37.5 MW	Phase 2 91.5 MW	Phase 3 135 MW	Phase 4 240.8 MW	Phase 5 80.5 MW	Total Annual MW·h
2005	125,279	262,659	4,527	-	-	392,465
2006	126,278	313,075	436,492	-	-	875,845
2007	109,809	279,581	406,006	365,547	12,472	1,173,415
2008	126,464	309,123	442,975	698,310	243,006	1,819,878
2009	114,538	299,164	382,743	683,557	220,461	1,700,463
2010	118,804	290,015	406,619	667,902	228,384	1,711,724
2011	126,199	313,783	419,761	733,711	241,538	1,834,992
2012	133,090	301,114	437,006	714,711	238,504	1,824,425
2013	114,990	307,886	462,095	706,289	238,533	1,829,793
2014	125,722	323,607	448,344	720,417	249,477	1,867,567
2015	109,446	283,044	373,191	609,580	206,118	1,581,379
2016	114,330	297,092	420,763	690,042	238,264	1,760,491
2017	97,304	256,576	402,069	685,549	229,886	1,671,384
Average annual production (years 2008–2017) :						1,760,210
Average Capacity Factor (years 2008–2017) :						34.3%

== See also ==
- Sweetwater, Texas
- Wind power in Texas
