= Desert Sky Wind Farm =

Wind farm in Texas, United States

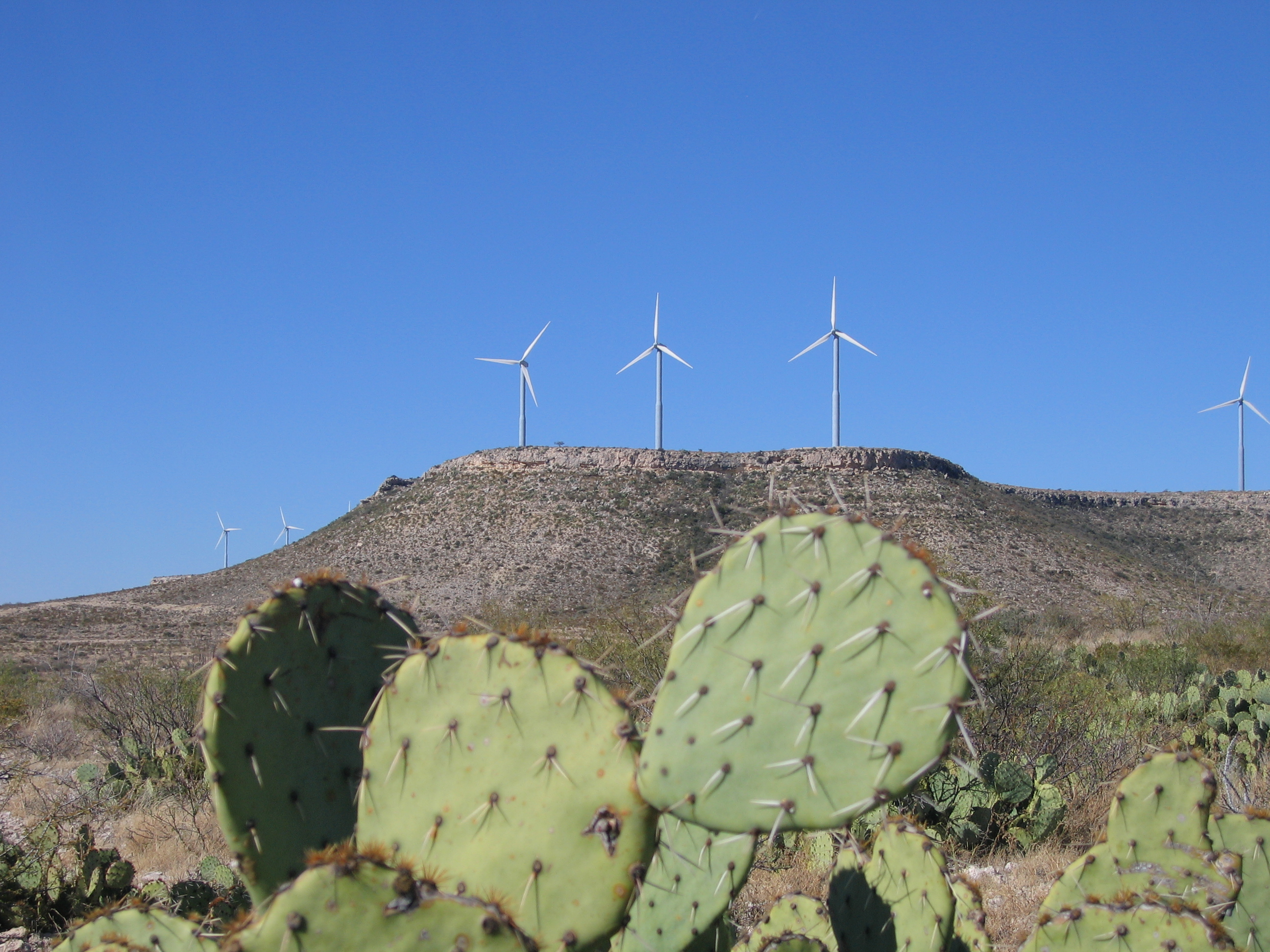
- Part of the Farm off of Interstate 10
- Country: United States
- Location: Pecos County, near Iraan, Texas
- Coordinates: 30°54′57″N 102°6′29″W
- Status: Operational
- Owner: American Electric Power (AEP)

Wind farm
- Type: Onshore

Power generation
- Nameplate capacity: 160.5 MW

The Desert Sky Wind Farm is a 160.5 megawatt (MW) wind power station near the far West Texas town of Iraan, in Pecos County. The wind farm consists of 107 GE wind turbines, each rated at 1.5 megawatts spread over a 15-square-mile (39 km^{2}) area. American Electric Power (AEP) owns the facility and CPS Energy of San Antonio purchases all power produced under long-term agreements with AEP.

== See also ==
- List of power stations in Texas
- Wind power in Texas
