= Texas Enterprise Fund =

The Texas Enterprise Fund is a business incentive fund that was created by legislation in 2003. The fund, which had an initial $295 million investment, is used for ensuring the growth of business in Texas. One of Texas’ most competitive recruitment tools, these funds are used primarily to attract new business to the state or assist with the substantial expansion of an existing business as part of a competitive recruitment situation. Sources indicate that since 2003 the Fund has yielded up to $6.3 billion in capital investment in Texas by out-of-state companies . It is estimated that the economic development tool has created over 63,000 jobs .

In 2004, authorization was given for the fund to grant $20 million to Countrywide Financial in return for a promise "to create 7,500 new jobs in the state by 2010." The grant (all of which are approved by the Governor, the Lieutenant Governor and Speaker of the House) is one of the largest made from the fund in terms of the size and the number of jobs promised. In the fall of 2007, while slashing jobs and with its stock price plummeting, Countrywide was eventually acquired in a fire sale by Bank of America. But thanks to the "claw-back" provisions in the program, grantees return all funds to the state for jobs not created.

In 2012, it was announced that Apple would be adding a new campus in Austin, creating 3,600 new jobs. The Fund would be investing $21 million over ten years.

== See also ==
- Economy of Texas
- Texas Emerging Technology Fund
- Texas Tax Code Chapter 313
