= Texas Emerging Technology Fund =

- Company type: Government
- Industry: Private Equity
- Founded: 2005
- Headquarters: Austin, Texas, United States
- Products: Venture Capital
- Total assets: $500 Million
- Number of employees: ~ 8
- Website: www.emergingtechfund.com

The Texas Emerging Technology Fund (often abbreviated as TETF or ETF) is a technology investment fund created by legislation in 2005 at the urging of Governor Rick Perry to provide Texas with an unparalleled advantage in the research, development, and commercialization of emerging technologies. The enabling legislation (Texas HB 1765 of the 79th Legislature) launched the ETF with $200 million to help create jobs and develop the economy of Texas. Legislative revisions during the 2007 and 2009 sessions have expanded the total funds under management to approximately $500 million.

As of October 2010, the program has given a total of $173 million to 120 companies as well as $161 million to educational institutions.

Governor Greg Abbott signed a law ending the Texas Emerging Technology Fund on June 4, 2015.

== Fund administration ==
=== Investment Focus ===
The ETF focuses on three main investment areas:

- Incentives for Commercialization Activities: early-stage technology investment funds designed to assist companies in transforming ideas, concepts, and prototypes into commercial viable products.
- Research Award Matching: funds create public-private partnerships which leverage the unique strengths of universities, federal government grant programs, and industry.
- Acquisition of Research Superiority: funds for Texas higher education institutions to recruit the best research talent in the world.

ETF's first investments were executed in May 2006. By October 1, 2009, the ETF was the single largest pre-seed investor for emerging technology companies in the entire United States. As of June 6, 2011, the ETF had invested $196M in 132 commercialization investments. Approximately 1/2 of ETF's commercialization investments have been made within the biotechnology and life sciences industry. 2014 has witnessed a slowdown in all three versions of ETF awards at the same time a special Texas House subcommittee explores incentives programs ahead of the 84th Texas regular legislative session.

=== Deal Sourcing ===
The ETF established seven Regional Centers of Innovation and Commercialization (RCICs) to foster technology commercialization throughout the entire state of Texas and act as an efficient deal sourcing mechanism. In addition, a statewide Life Science Regional Center of Innovation and Commercialization also was formed. The RCICs act as the regional agent to identify, evaluate, and submit promising proposals from their respective regions to the ETF Advisory Committee. The ETF Advisory Committee makes recommendations to Trustees who make final decisions on awards. RCICs work closely with applicants in assisting with ETF proposal development, post-proposal debriefings, and commercialization activities. In addition, RCICs are a strong focal point to increasing cooperation and spurring collaboration between industrial, financial, and academic entities.

=== Accolades ===
The ETF has been recognized nationally as the most active early-stage technology venture funds in the country. The fund estimates that portfolio companies and awardees have raised close to $1B in follow-on investment and private funding following ETF investment yet this is self reported information and has not been audited. Cardiospectra, Inc., an ETF portfolio company, was acquired by Volcano Corporation in December 2007 for $25M in cash with an additional $38M available upon the achievement of specific milestones. ETF's return on investment on the Cardiospectra deal was 216% as of January 2011. Several ETF companies have been acquired and there has been one initial public offering since the fund's inception.

=== Fund Management ===
The ETF is housed within the Economic Development and Tourism division of the Texas State Government.

== Debates and commentary about funding ==
The internal rate of return (IRR) of the ETF s very low and comparable to investing in U.S. treasuries. Therefore, questions have arisen about the ETF's required rate of return and performance against benchmark.

Under the U.S. Securities and Exchange Commission's Rule 501 Regulation D, TETF does not fall under any of the eight definitions of accredited investor, affecting TETF's participation in follow on offerings.

An October 2010 article by the Dallas Morning News editorial board argued for fundamental reform in how the fund works. The board stated, "The way Texas doles out money... raises such serious questions about the role of political donations in the fund's operation that the governor and the Texas Legislature should revamp it." Although the board considered it "a valuable program", it remarked that "other states have tried to keep politicians at arm's length from the selection and funding process... Texas needs to do the same".

In response to criticisms, Governor Perry has said that it "is a pretty rare occurrence" for him to know that political supporters have connections to firms that receive funding. One such rare occurrence was Convergen Life Sciences, now called Genprex. The CEO, David Nance, was a donor and his company received a $4.5 million ETF award.

Many involved in the ETF process firmly believe the implications and criticisms of the press, most notably the Dallas Morning News, to be "inaccurate and ignoring the hundreds of individuals around the state that freely devote their time, energy and efforts to the process to ensure that Texas is pushing the technological envelope that will lead to scientific breakthroughs and a stronger economy." Despite criticism by the press, a majority of the ETF's 140 investments since 2005 are still operating as of February 2013.

Many of the jobs created by the fund have been outside Texas and several of the companies have left the state. By government accounting standards the fund has lost $25 million so far. but a separate valuation of the fund for legislators produced a significant gain in fund value.

Texas government code 490.102 (a) (1) specifies a 50% allocation of legislative appropriations for ETF to Incentives for Commercialization Activities awards, though Trustees have discretion to vary the allocation of legislatively appropriated funds to Incentives for Commercialization Activities, Research Award Matching, Acquisition of Research Superiority awards each and every legislative biennium. Some critics cite large awards to Texas A&M University for Research Award Matching afforded by this statute.

Texas government code 490.153 (b.) institutes a 2% limit on funding for Regional Centers of Innovation and Commercialization. Upon review of 2013 ETF annual report to the Texas legislature, ETF has exceeded allowed amount for awards to Regional Centers of Innovation and Commercialization in excess of 4.5 million dollars as of August 31, 2013.

Example calculation: Texas legislature appropriated 50M USD for ETF during the fiscal year 2014 and 2015 biennium. Therefore, $500,000 is available to fund RCICs for the FY 14/15 biennium (50M * 50% * 2%). However, ETF may have already exceeded this limit with awards for five or more RCICs. These awards have been announced in newspaper reports and by the RCICs, but have not been formally announced by ETF manager as recommended by state auditor.

Transparency concerns have dogged the fund since inception. Nevertheless, the state legislature has consistently funded the ETF, even as some legislators express concerns over the fund's true performance in the areas of job creation and return on Texas taxpayers' monies.

The Texas state auditor's report of 2011 was not complete, in that job creation and valuation methodology remain opaque up to the present day.

== See also ==
- Venture Capital
- Economy of Texas
- Texas Enterprise Fund
- Yozma Program - Israeli program to kick-start the venture capital scene in the 1990's
