= Sherbino Wind Farm =

Wind farm in Texas, United States

Sherbino Mesa Wind Farm
- Country: United States
- Location: Pecos County, Texas
- Coordinates: 30°48′39.6″N 102°21′43.2″W
- Status: Decommissioned
- Decommission date: January 2021

Wind farm
- Type: Onshore

Power generation
- Units operational: 110
- Make and model: Vestas V-90, Clipper Windpower C-96
- Nameplate capacity: 300 MW

The Sherbino Mesa Wind Farm is located in Pecos County in west Texas. The first 150 megawatts (MW) of the project, which has a potential capacity of 750 MW, is in operation. Phase I utilizes 50 Vestas V-90 Mk.5 wind turbine generators, each with a rated capacity of 3 MW. BP will operate phase I of the project.

Phase II, located on a 20,000-acre (8,100 ha) site 40 miles (64 km) west of Fort Stockton, utilizes 60 Clipper Windpower C-96 wind turbines, each with a rated capacity of 2.5 MW. This phase will be in operation by the end of 2011.

== See also ==
- List of wind farms
- Wind power in Texas
