= King Mountain Wind Farm =

Wind farm in Texas, United States

- Country: United States
- Location: Upton County, Texas
- Coordinates: 31°14′16″N 102°14′16″W
- Owner: FPL Energy

Wind farm
- Type: Onshore

Power generation
- Units operational: 214
- Make and model: Siemens Wind Power
- Nameplate capacity: 278.2 MW
- Annual net output: 750 GWh

The King Mountain Wind Farm is a 278.2 megawatt (MW) wind farm in Upton County, Texas, United States with 214 Siemens 1.3 MW wind turbines. The project was completed in December 2001. Annual electricity production is more than 750 GW·h. The wind farm is owned by FPL Energy and the customers for the electricity generated are Reliant Energy (198.9 MW), Austin Energy (76.7 MW) and Texas-New Mexico Power Company (2.6 MW).

== See also ==
- Wind power in the United States
- Wind power in Texas
