= Roscoe Wind Farm =

Wind farm in Texas, USA

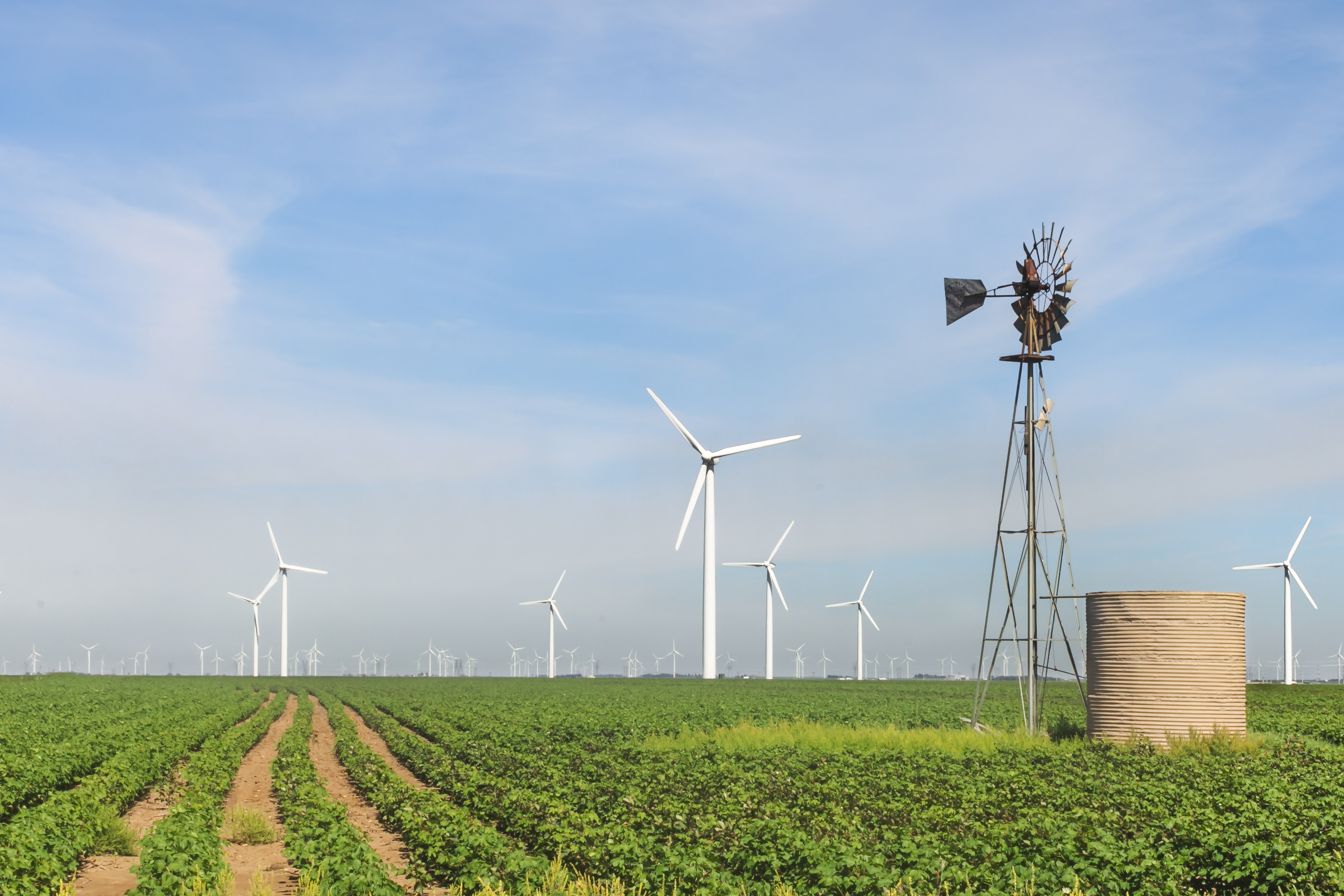
- Roscoe Wind Farm at sunrise
- Country: United States
- Location: Texas
- Coordinates: 32°15′52″N 100°20′39″W
- Status: Operational
- Commission date: 2009
- Construction cost: >US$1 billion
- Owner: RWE AG

Wind farm
- Type: Onshore
- Rated wind speed: 17 mph (27 km/h)

Power generation
- Units operational: 627
- Nameplate capacity: 781.5 MW
- Capacity factor: 31.7% (average 2011-2017)
- Annual net output: 2,174 GW⋅h (7,830 TJ)

The Roscoe Wind Farm near Roscoe, Texas is one of the world's largest-capacity wind farms. With 627 wind turbines and a total installed capacity of 781.5 MW, owned and operated by RWE. At the time of its completion in 2009, it was the largest wind farm in the world, surpassing the nearby 735.5-megawatt Horse Hollow Wind Energy Center. In 2012, it was overtaken by California's 1,020-megawatt Alta Wind Energy Center.

== Facility details ==
Roscoe was constructed in four phases. The first phase, Roscoe, was constructed in 2008 and consists of 209 Mitsubishi 1-megawatt turbines. Phase two is called Champion was also completed in 2008 and includes 55 Siemens 2.3-megawatt machines. The third phase is called Pyron. Its 166 GE 1.5-megawatt turbines were commissioned in mid-2009 shortly before the fourth phase, Inadale, was completed. Inadale adds 197 more Mitsubishi 1-megawatt turbines to the existing project.

The project cost more than $1 billion and provides enough power for more than 250,000 average Texan homes. It is located about 200 mi (320 km) west of Fort Worth, spanning parts of four Texas counties and covering nearly 100,000 acres (40,000 ha), several times the size of Manhattan.

Cliff Etheredge, a local cotton farmer, helped to organize the project. In addition to its large size, the farm is also notable for the large number of individual land owners (as many as 400) who share in royalties from the project. Wind farms are helping to revive the local economy in remote areas of West Texas and the Texas Panhandle.

The Roscoe Wind Farm and Cliff Etheredge are featured in the 2010 documentary film, Carbon Nation.

== Electricity production ==
Roscoe Wind Farm Generation (MW·h)
Year	Roscoe 209 MW Unit	Champion 126.5 MW Unit	Pyron 249 MW Unit	Inadale 197 MW Unit	Total Annual MW·h
2008	523,383	277,725	-	-	801,108
2009	488,402	317,097	506,951	-	1,312,450
2010	532,548	349,945	559,509	384,481	1,826,483
2011	615,420	416,677	603,565	380,443	2,016,105
2012	596,742	413,620	716,988	476,472	2,203,822
2013	561,408	393,195	775,605	549,300	2,279,508
2014	591,896	406,486	811,344	592,687	2,402,413
2015	440,211	349,128	706,057	495,005	1,990,401
2016	562,424	308,250	772,988	539,177	2,182,839
2017	554,037	366,144	712,817	506,879	2,139,877
Average Annual Production (2011–2017)					2,173,566

== See also ==
- Wind power in the United States
- List of onshore wind farms
- Wind power in Texas
- List of power stations in Texas
