= Brazos Wind Farm =

Wind farm in Texas, United States

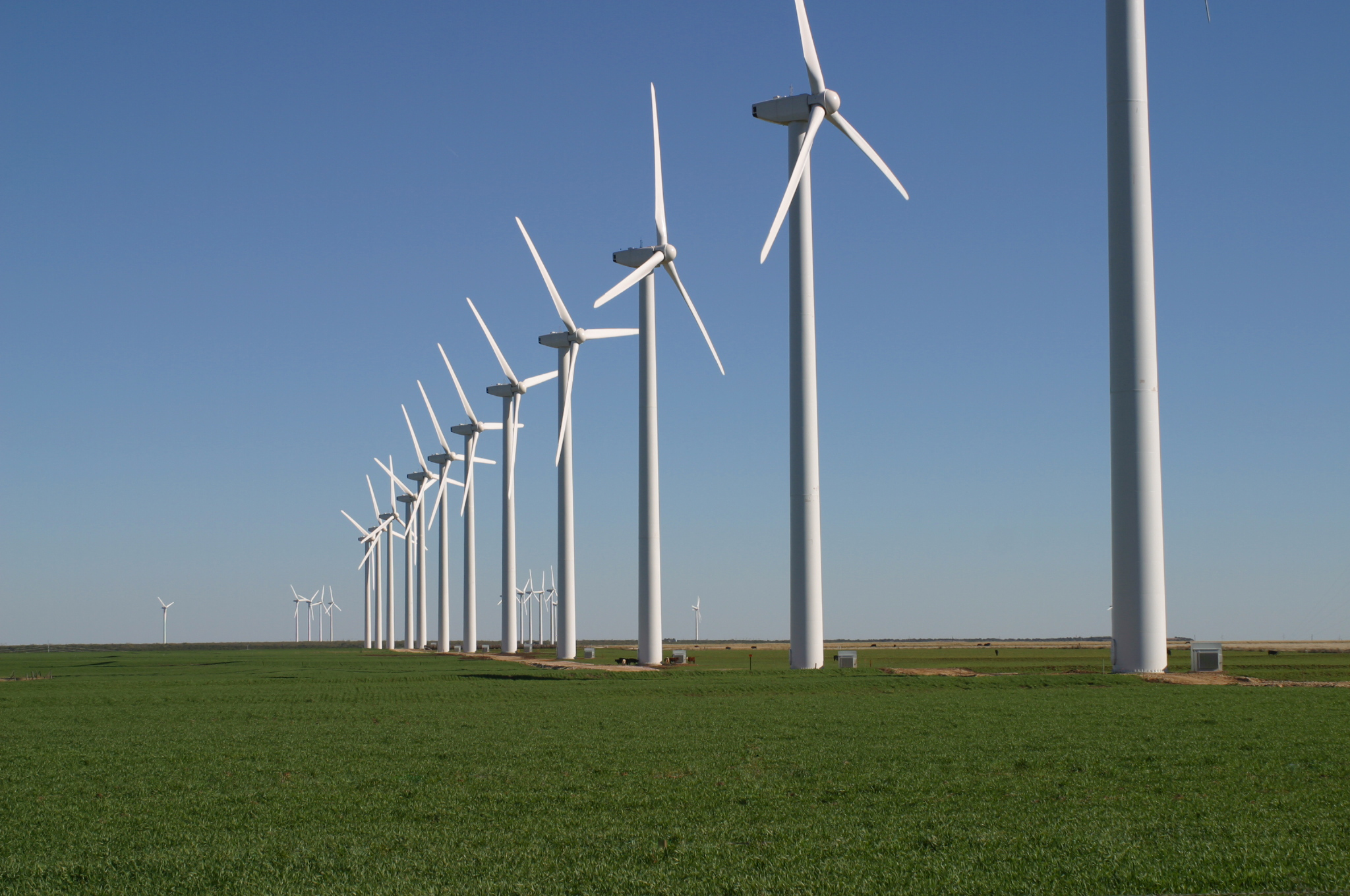
- Brazos Wind Farm, Fluvanna, Texas
- Country: United States
- Location: Fluvanna, Texas
- Coordinates: 32.949889°N 101.146912°W
- Status: Operational
- Commission date: 2003
- Owners: Mitsui, Shell Wind Energy

Wind farm
- Type: Onshore

Power generation
- Units operational: 160
- Make and model: Mitsubishi
- Nameplate capacity: 160 MW

The Brazos Wind Farm, also known as the Green Mountain Energy Wind Farm at Brazos, is located in Borden and Scurry counties in Texas. It has 160 wind turbines, each rated at one megawatt (MW) and supplied by Mitsubishi, and was completed in December 2003. The wind farm sells generated power on a long-term basis to a local power distributor, TXU Energy, to supply approximately 30,000 homes in Texas. 50% of the Brazos Wind Farm is owned by Shell Wind Energy, Inc.

== See also ==
- Green Mountain Energy
- Fluvanna, Texas
- Double Mountain Fork Brazos River
- Roscoe Wind Farm
- South Plains Wind Farm
