= Buffalo Gap Wind Farm =

Wind farm in Texas, USA

- Official name: Buffalo Gap Wind Farm
- Country: United States
- Location: 20 miles (30 km) south west of Abilene, Texas
- Coordinates: 32°18′38″N 100°8′57″W
- Status: Operational
- Commission date: 2006
- Owner: AES Wind Generation

Wind farm
- Type: Onshore

Power generation
- Units operational: 296 turbines
- Make and model: Vestas V80-1.8 MW, GE SLE-1.5 MW, Siemens SWT-2.3 MW
- Nameplate capacity: 523.3 MW
- Capacity factor: 33.3% (average 2010-2017)
- Annual net output: 1,529 GW·h

The Buffalo Gap Wind Farm is located in Nolan and Taylor Counties, about 20 miles (30 km) south west of Abilene, Texas. It was constructed in three phases and has a total wind generation capacity of 523.3 megawatts (MW).

== Facility details ==
Buffalo Gap 1 consists of 67 Vestas V-80 wind turbines, each rated at 1.8 MW, for a total capacity of 120.6 MW. The wind farm was developed by SeaWest WindPower and is currently owned by AES Wind Generation. The power is sold to Direct Energy Texas under a 15-year power purchase agreement.

Buffalo Gap 2 is a 232.5 MW expansion consisting of 155 GE SLE 1.5 MW wind turbines. The facility was developed by AES Wind Generation and went into commercial operation in June 2007. The power is sold to Direct Energy under a 10-year power purchase agreement.

Buffalo Gap 3 is a 170.2 MW addition, completed in September 2008, consisting of 74 Siemens 2.3 MW wind turbines.

== Electricity production ==
Buffalo Gap Wind Electricity Generation (MW·h)
Year	Buffalo Gap 1 (120.6 MW)	Buffalo Gap 2 (232.5 MW)	Buffalo Gap 3 (170.2 MW)	Total Annual MW·h
2006	284,020			284,020
2007	338,276	289,344		627,620
2008	346,582	592,112	119,172	1,057,866
2009	237,641	343,888	282,313	863,842
2010	355,124	656,526	457,379	1,469,029
2011	393,144	748,033	532,497	1,673,674
2012	390,997	716,153	516,758	1,623,908
2013	374,189	680,246	489,721	1,544,156
2014	385,083	705,214	512,171	1,602,468
2015	324,844	595,982	422,084	1,342,910
2016	349,474	673,377	464,680	1,487,531
2017	361,998	650,578	473,993	1,486,569
Average Annual Production (years 2010–2017) :				1,528,781

== See also ==
- Wind power
- List of onshore wind farms
