= Wildorado Wind Ranch =

Coordinates: 35.307°N 102.32°W

The Wildorado Wind Ranch, completed in 2007, is located on approximately 16,000 acres (6,500 ha) 25 miles (40 km) west of Amarillo, Texas, and consists of 161 MW of wind turbines (70 Siemens Mk II turbines each capable of generating 2.3 MW at peak wind speeds). These turbines have the capacity to meet the electricity demand of more than 50,000 households. The Wildorado Wind Ranch was developed by Cielo Wind Power, of Austin, Texas, in conjunction with Edison Mission Group of Irvine, California,
