= Benjamin Developments Ltd v Robt Jones (Pacific) Ltd =

New Zealand contract law case

- Court: Court of Appeal of New Zealand
- Full case name: Benjamin Developments Ltd v Robt Jones (Pacific) Ltd
- Decided: 9 December 1993
- Citation: [1994] 3 NZLR 189

Court membership
- Judges sitting: Casey P, Hardie Boys J, Gallen J

Benjamin Developments Ltd v Robt Jones (Pacific) Ltd [1994] 3 NZLR 189 is a cited case in New Zealand regarding the interpretation of express terms of a contract. Express terms must be given their plain meaning and extrinsic evidence (i.e. background matters) is not able to be considered, unless such terms are uncertain or ambiguous.

== Background ==
In 1988 Robert Jones (Pacific) Ltd agreed to purchase a building being constructed by Benjamin Developments (a subsidiary of McConnell Dowell Corporation). The building later became the Coopers and Lybrand building, and is now known as the ANZ Centre.

However, the purchase agreement was conditional, with the main condition that prior to possession, Benjamin Developments was required to lease the building, and at specified rentals.

In the aftermath of the stock market crash, Benjamin Developments struggled to find tenants for the building. Faced with the option of having to sell the property to an underwriter for a significant amount less than RJP had agreed to pay, they decided to offer significant cash incentives to attract tenants to the building, about $60 million worth in total.

When it came time for RJP to take possession, they refused, claiming that the floors were a few inches too short, and that they claimed that the contact called for real rentals, without incentives.

== Held ==
The court ruled that the plain meaning of the lease rentals did not exclude incentives. Hardie-Boys stated "Where however the contractual intention is clear from the words used then the court must give effect to it. It is not permissible to inquire into preliminary or background matters in order to find a different meaning".
