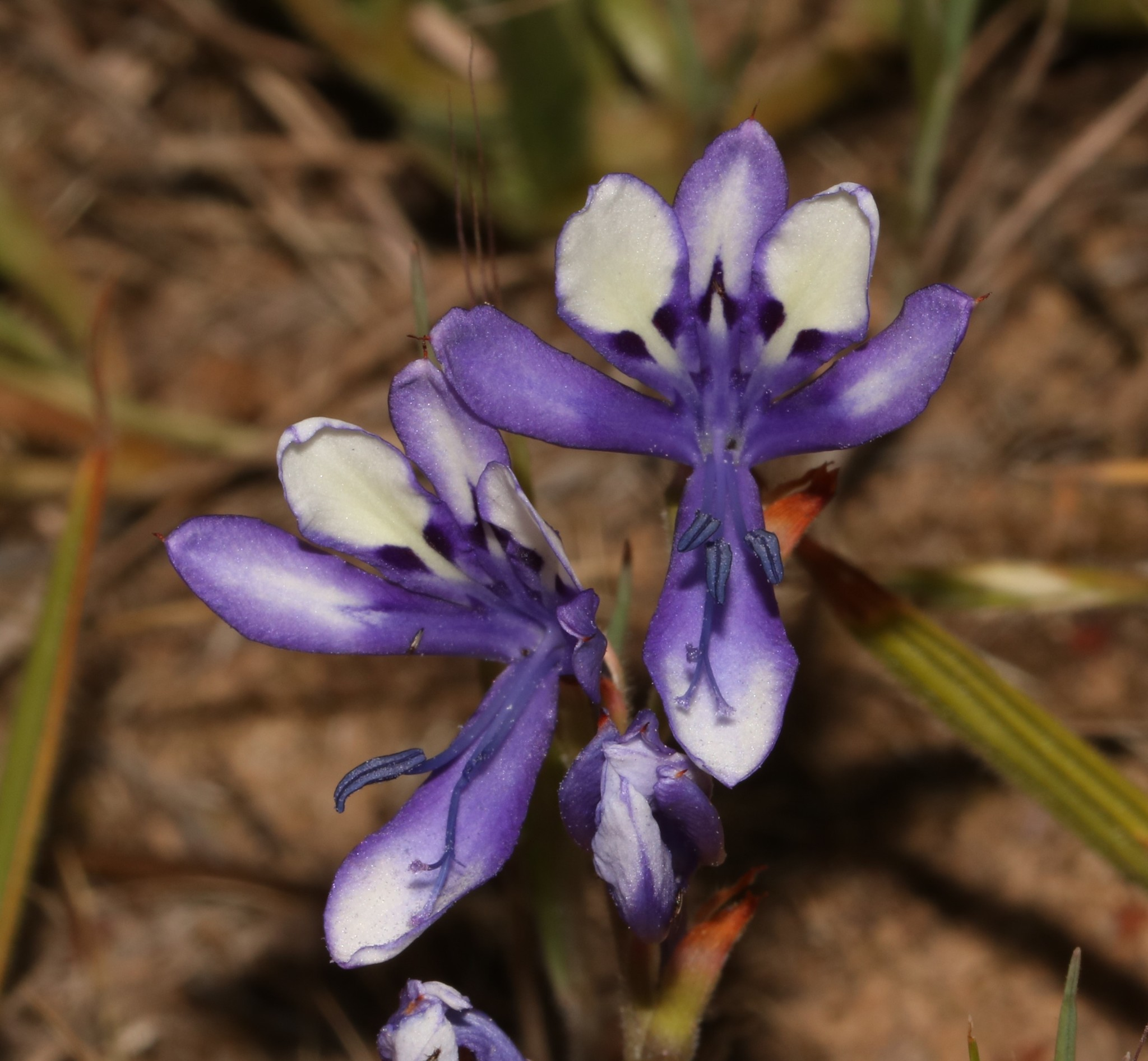

Scientific classification
- Kingdom: Plantae
- Clade: Tracheophytes
- Clade: Angiosperms
- Clade: Monocots
- Order: Asparagales
- Family: Iridaceae
- Genus: Babiana
- Species: B. inclinata

Binomial name
- Babiana inclinata Goldblatt & J.C.Manning

= Babiana inclinata =

Species of flowering plant

Babiana inclinata is a species of geophytic, perennial flowering plant in the family Iridaceae. The species is endemic to the Western Cape and is part of the renosterveld. It occurs in the lowlands between Piketberg, Porterville, Gouda and Darling. The plant had a range of 2 800 km^{2} but has lost 95% of its habitat to grain cultivation. There are only 10 fragmented subpopulations left, mostly in road reserves. The subpopulations are threatened by excessive fire, invasive plants and the absence of specialist pollinators.
