= Gouda Wind Facility =

Wind farm in South Africa

Gouda Wind Farm
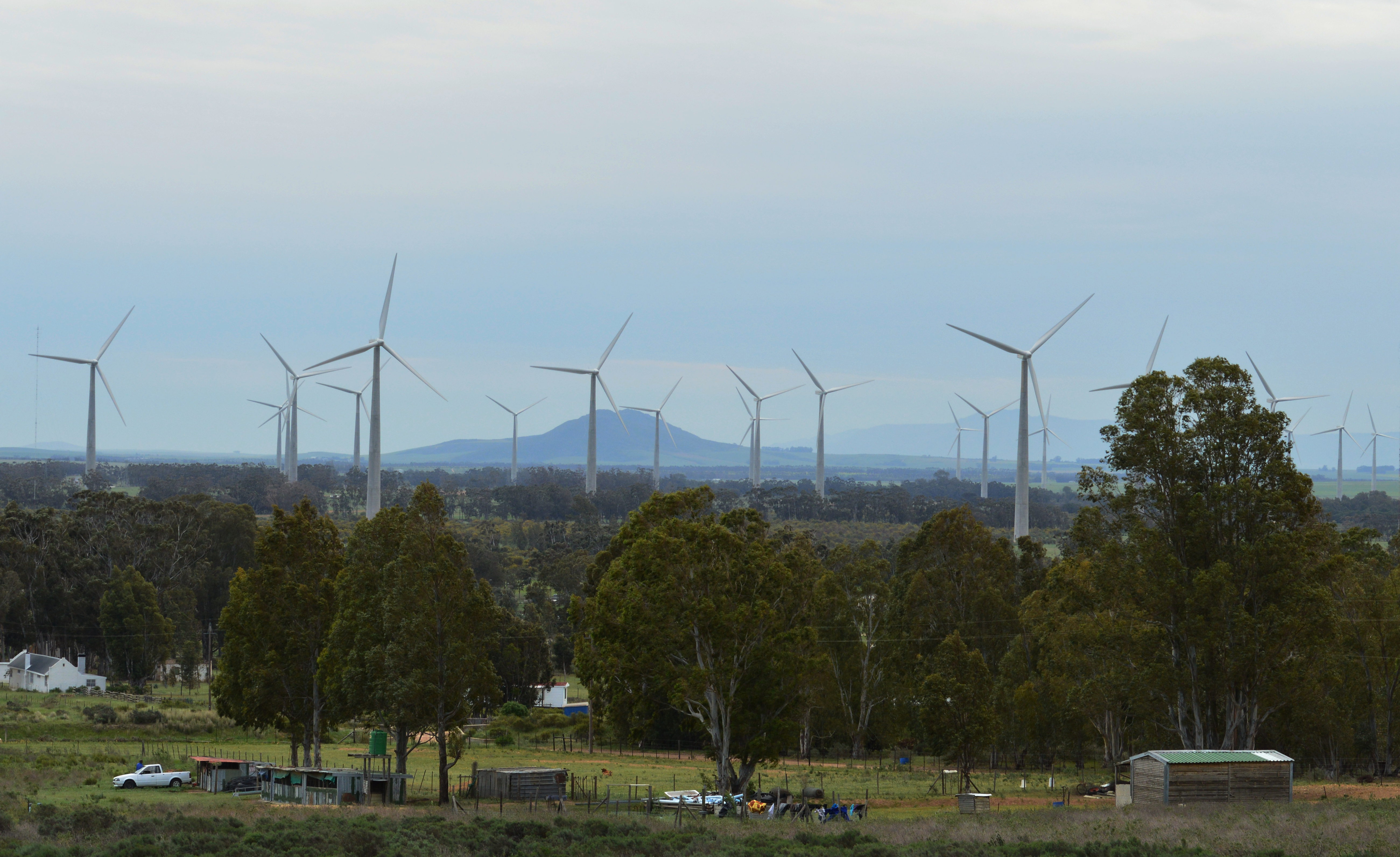
- Country: South Africa
- Location: Gouda, Drakenstein Local Municipality, Western Cape
- Coordinates: 33°18′S 19°02′E
- Status: Operational
- Commission date: September 2015
- Owners: Aveng and Acciona Energia

Wind farm
- Type: Onshore

Power generation
- Units operational: 46 turbines
- Nameplate capacity: 138 MW

Gouda Wind Farm is a wind farm just outside the town of Gouda in the Western Cape province of South Africa that at 138 MW is one of the largest wind-farms in Southern Africa. The project cost R2.7 billion (US$199 million) and was brought online in early September 2015. At the time of its completion it was the largest wind-farm in the Western Cape. It is capable of powering 200,000 households per year or 400-gigawatt hours of electricity. It is estimated that power generated from Gouda Wind Farm will avoid the emission of 406 million metric tons of CO_{2} per year of equivalent power produced from a coal-fired power plant. It is owned in partnership between the South African renewable energy and engineering firm Aveng and Spanish renewable energy company Acciona Energia.

It is located along the R44 34 km from the town of Porterville or 115 km north east of Cape Town, just outside of Gouda.

== Design ==
The wind farm is unusual in that it was the first wind-farm in South Africa to have concrete towers instead of the more usual steel towers. It was decided to use concrete as they could be produced domestically unlike steel towers which needed to be imported. Each of the turbines three blades are 50 meters in length with the pitch of the blades designed to maintain rotation speed as wind speed drops by increasing; they are designed to shut down if wind speeds exceed 70 km/h. They are mounted on 100m high concrete towers. The turbines are required to be designed so as not to exceed 35 decibels of sound.

== See also ==
- List of wind farms in South Africa
