= McConnell Dowell =

New Zealand infrastructure construction company

- Industry: construction and engineering
- Founded: 1961 in Auckland, New Zealand
- Founders: Malcolm McConnell and Jim Dowell
- Owner: Aveng
- Number of employees: over 3,500 (2019)
- Website: mcconnelldowell.com

McConnell Dowell is an infrastructure construction company founded in New Zealand in 1961. In 2003 it became a wholly owned subsidiary of Aveng, which is listed on the Johannesburg Stock Exchange in South Africa.

== History ==
McConnell Dowell was formed in 1960 by two New Zealand engineers, Jim Dowell and Malcolm McConnell. It was involved in pipeline projects in New Zealand before expanding to Australia, Asia and the Middle East in the 1970s.

McConnell Dowell was listed on the New Zealand Stock Exchange in 1983 as part of the arrangements to take over Hamilton construction company Hawkins Holdings. During the remainder of the 1980s, McConnell Dowell also ventured outside of the engineering field int banking and finance, through shareholdings in National Insurance Company of New Zealand, National Pacific Corporation, Renouf Partners, Kupe and property development of the Robert Jones Tower in Auckland.

Following the 1987 stock market crash, McDonnell Dowell merged with Inter-Pacific Equity, an Australian investment bank, and sold off National Pacific to Government Life Insurance. Morrison Knudsen acquired a 48.9% shareholding McConnell Dowell in 1991, but in the mid-1990s sold its share to Dominion Bridge Corporation (Canada) who then held 63%. In 1999, Dominion Bridge sold its share to LTA Ltd (South Africa) which was acquired by Aveng the next year. Aveng acquired full ownership from the remaining minority shareholders in 2003 via a scheme of arrangement.

McConnell Dowell bought a majority interest in the South Australian company Built Environs in 2008.

McConnell Dowell was one of the construction partners in the Stronger Christchurch Infrastructure Rebuild Team which was responsible for rebuilding infrastructure in Christchurch following the 2011 Christchurch earthquake.

== Major projects ==
Some of the major projects that McConnell Dowell has built include:

- ANZ Centre, Auckland, New Zealand
- Marsden Point Oil Refinery, New Zealand
- Te Mihi Power Station, New Zealand
- Barwon Heads Bridge, Victoria
- Beauty World MRT station, Singapore
- Marina Bay Cruise Centre Singapore
- O-Bahn Busway Adelaide Access Project, South Australia
- Barangaroo ferry wharf, Sydney
- Gold Coast Light Rail, Queensland
- Chith Export Facility, Queensland
- Port Capacity Project, Port of Melbourne, Victoria
- Western Program Alliance, Victoria
- South Tarawa main road from Betio to Bonriki

== Safety ==
In the early 2010s, McConnell Dowell was accused of lacking a safety culture, and encouraging workers to report injuries as having occurred in their own time to preserve clean injury reports to leverage getting future large contracts. It claims to have improved its safety practices significantly over the last 30 years.

== Incidents ==
=== EPA vs Trevor Morgan ===
In 1995, McConnell Dowell's CEO Trevor Morgan was found guilty of an offence in the Land and Environment Court of New South Wales. Morgan had signed a return which showed that McConnell Dowell had only rarely contravened the licence’s permitted pollution level when, in fact, there were many occasions the level was exceeded. Morgan was fined $4,000.

=== Woolloomoolloo oil spill ===
In 2003 A pipeline was damaged at the Finger Wharf during construction works. In a court action initiated by the Environment Protection Authority against McConnell Dowell (found not guilty), Moltoni Corporation, a subcontractor working for McConnell Dowell in New South Wales was implicated for the discharge of oil into the waters of Woolloomooloo Bay. Moltoni was exonerated from any responsibility for damage to the pipeline and the consequent spillage.

=== Barangaroo Ferry Wharf construction fatality ===
In late 2015 McConnell Dowell were awarded a contract, by Transport for NSW to construct a new ferry wharf at Barangaroo. McConnell Dowell were appointed Principal Contractor for the project. On 1 March 2017, during the latter stages of the project, Tim McPherson, a worker for sub-contractor Brady Marine, was killed after being accidentally struck with a large steel header beam whilst working on a construction barge. He was killed instantaneously and declared dead at the scene. An investigation into the incident was initiated by SafeWork NSW and the New South Wales Police Force which resulted in the prosecution of both McConnell Dowell, and Brady Marine. Both companies were found guilty of failing to comply with the Health and Safety Act and fined A$500,000 and $450,000 respectively.
