= Wind farm =

Group of wind turbines

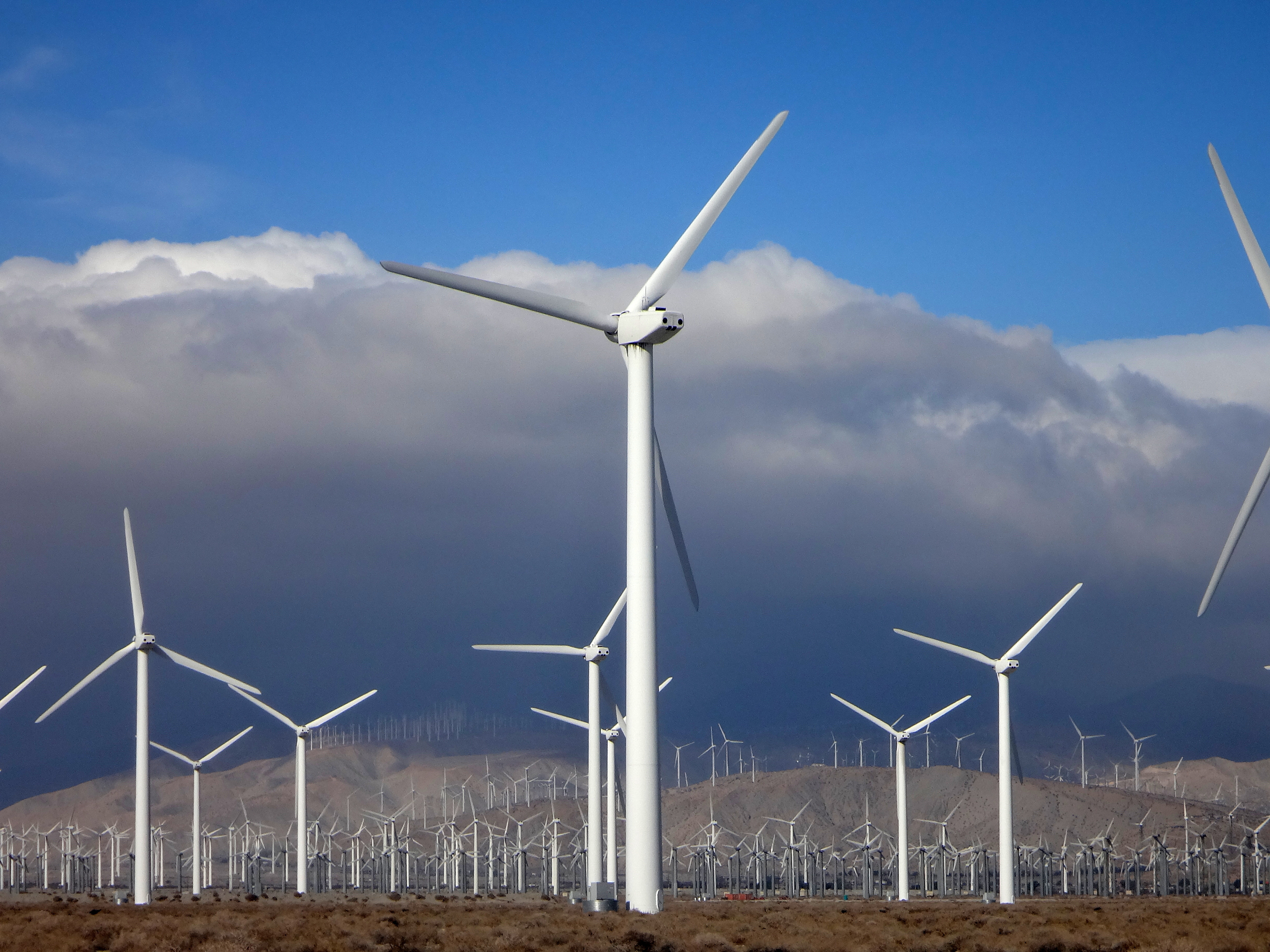
The San Gorgonio Pass wind farm in California, United States

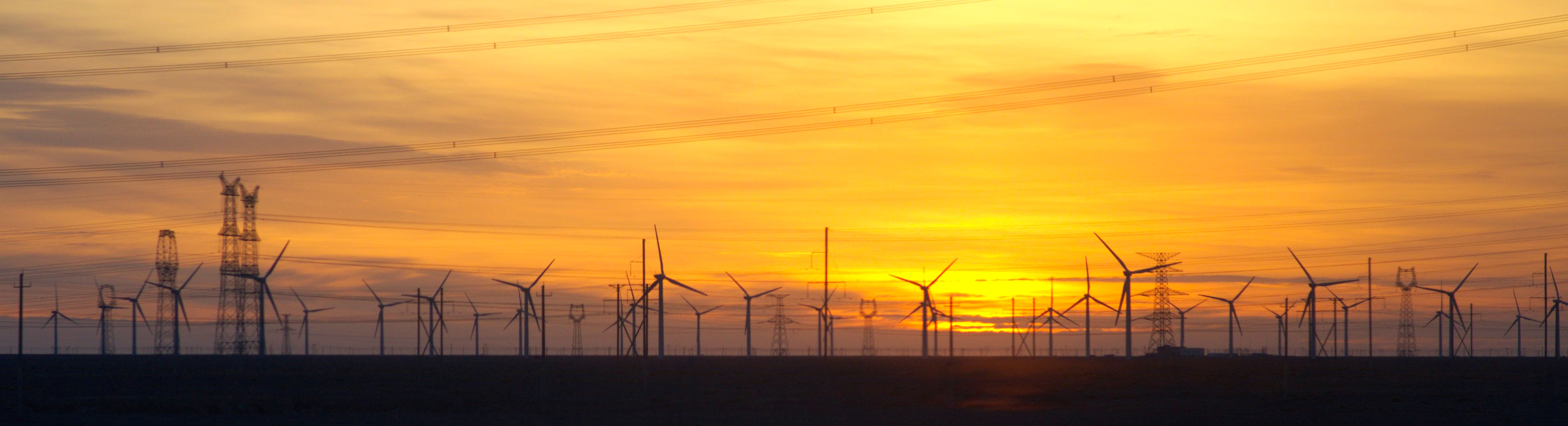
The Gansu Wind Farm in China is the largest wind farm in the world, with a target capacity of 20,000 MW by 2020.

A wind farm, also called a wind park or wind power plant, is a group of wind turbines in the same location used to produce electricity. Wind farms vary in size from a small number of turbines to several hundred wind turbines covering an extensive area. Wind farms may be either onshore or offshore.

Many of the largest operational onshore wind farms are located in China, India, and the United States. For example, the largest wind farm in the world, Gansu Wind Farm in China had a capacity of more than 6,000 MW by 2012, with a goal of 20,000 MW by 2020. As of December 2020, the 1218 MW Hornsea Wind Farm in the UK is the largest offshore wind farm in the world. Individual wind turbine designs continue to increase in power, resulting in fewer turbines being needed for the same total output.

Because they require no fuel, wind farms have less of an effect on the environment than many other forms of power generation and are often referred to as a good source of green energy. Wind farms have, however, been criticised for their visual and landscape effects. Typically they need to be spread over more land than other power stations and need to be built in wild and rural areas, which may lead to "industrialization of the countryside", habitat loss, and a drop in tourism. Some critics claim that wind farms have adverse health effects, but most researchers consider these claims to be pseudoscience (see wind turbine syndrome). Wind farms can interfere with radar, although in most cases, according to the U.S. Department of Energy, "siting and other mitigations have resolved conflicts and allowed wind projects to co-exist effectively with radar".

== Siting considerations ==
Location is critical to the overall success of a wind farm. Additional conditions contributing to a successful wind farm location include: wind conditions, access to electric transmission, physical access, and local electricity prices.

=== Wind conditions ===
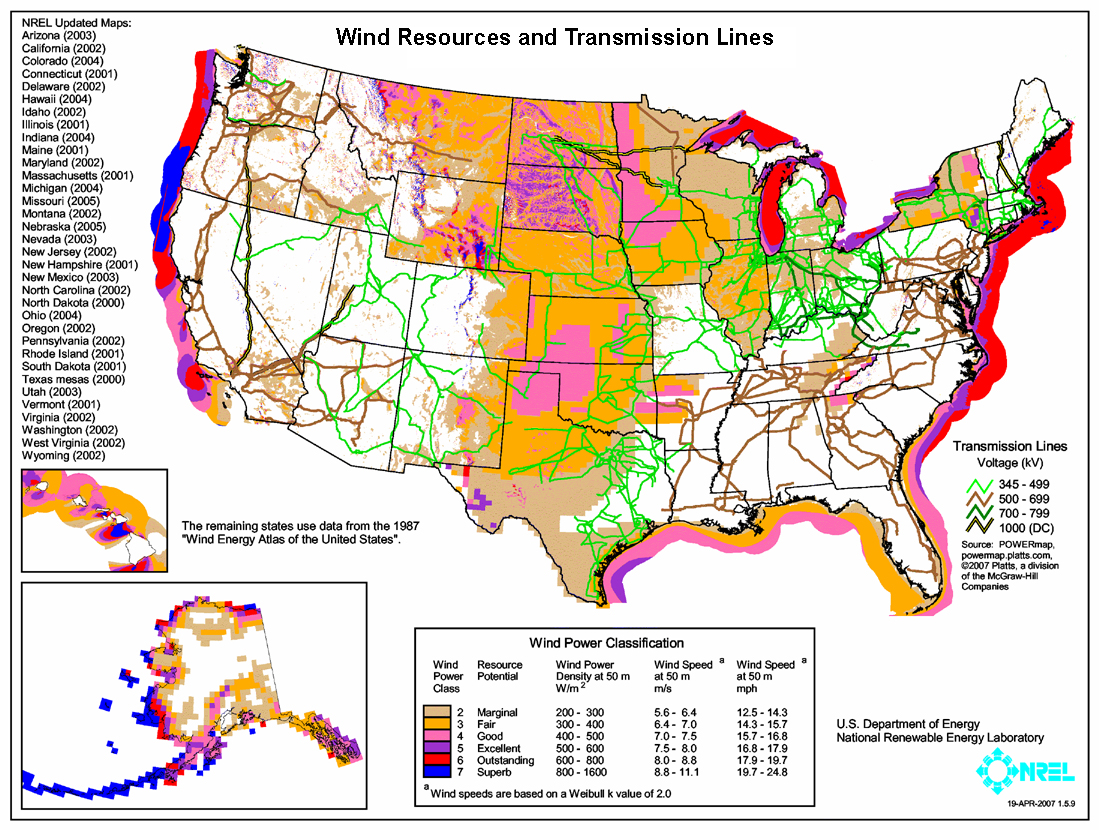
Map of available wind power over the United States - colour codes indicate wind power density class

The faster the average wind speed, the more electricity the wind turbine will generate, so faster winds are generally economically better for wind farm developments. The balancing factor is that strong gusts and high turbulence require stronger more expensive turbines, otherwise there is a risk of damage. The average power in the wind is not proportional to the average wind speed. For this reason, the ideal wind conditions would be strong but consistent winds with low turbulence coming from a single direction.

Mountain passes are ideal locations for wind farms under these conditions. Mountain passes channel wind, blocked by mountains, through a tunnel-like pass toward areas of lower pressure and flatter land. Passes used for wind farms such as the San Gorgonio Pass and Altamont Pass are known for their abundant wind resource capacity and capability for large-scale wind farms. These types of passes were the first places in the 1980s to have heavily invested large-scale wind farms after approval for wind energy development by the U.S. Bureau of Land Management. From these wind farms, developers learned much about turbulence and crowding effects of large-scale wind projects, which were previously unresearched, in the U.S. due to the lack of operational wind farms large enough to conduct these types of studies.

Usually sites are screened on the basis of a wind atlas, and validated with on-site wind measurements via long term or permanent meteorological-tower data using anemometers and wind vanes. Meteorological wind data alone is usually not sufficient for accurate siting of a large wind power project. Collection of site specific data for wind speed and direction is crucial to determining site potential in order to finance the project. Local winds are often monitored for a year or more, detailed wind maps are constructed, along with rigorous grid capability studies conducted, before any wind generators are installed.

The wind blows faster at higher altitudes because of the reduced influence of drag. The increase in velocity with altitude is most dramatic near the surface and is affected by topography, surface roughness, and upwind obstacles such as trees or buildings. At altitudes of thousands of feet/hundreds of metres above sea level, the power in the wind decreases proportional to the decrease in air density.

=== Electricity grid considerations ===
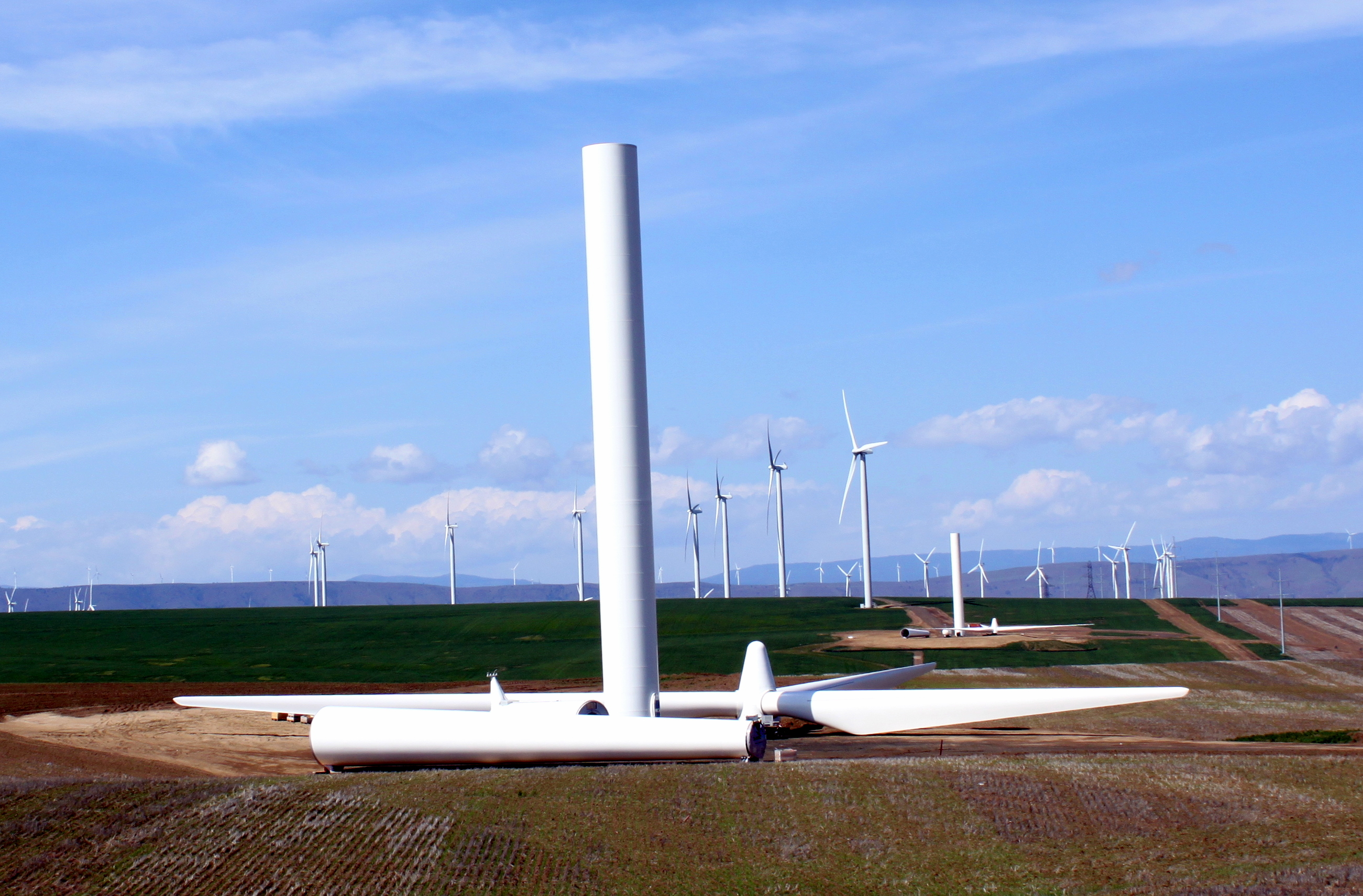
Part of the Biglow Canyon Wind Farm, Oregon, United States with a turbine under construction

Often in heavily saturated energy markets, the first step in site selection for large-scale wind projects, before wind resource data collection, is finding areas with adequate available transfer capability (ATC). ATC is the measure of the remaining capacity in a transmission system available for further integration of two interconnected areas without significant upgrades to existing transmission lines and substations. Significant equipment upgrades have substantial costs, potentially undermining the viability of a project within a location, regardless of wind resource availability. Once a list of capable areas is constructed, the list is refined based on long term wind measurements, among other environmental or technical limiting factors such as proximity to load and land procurement.

Many independent system operators (ISOs) in the United States such as the California ISO and Midcontinent ISO use interconnection request queues to allow developers to propose a new generation for a specific given area and grid interconnection. These request queues have both deposit costs at the time of request and ongoing costs for the studies the ISO will make for up to years after the request was submitted to ascertain the viability of the interconnection due to factors such as ATC. Larger corporations who can afford to bid the most queues will most likely have market power as to which sites with the most resource and opportunity are eventually developed. After the deadline to request a place in the queue has passed, many firms will withdraw their requests after gauging the competition in order to make back some of the deposit for each request that is determined too risky in comparison to other larger firms' requests.

== Design ==
=== Turbine spacing ===
A major factor in wind-farm design is the spacing between the turbines, both laterally and axially (with respect to the prevailing winds). The closer the turbines are together, the more the upwind turbines block wind from their rear neighbors (wake effect). However, spacing turbines far apart increases the costs of roads and power cables, and raises the amount of land needed to install a specific capacity of turbines. As a result of these factors, turbine spacing varies by site. Generally speaking, manufacturers require a minimum of 3.5 times the turbine's rotor diameter of clear space between each adjacent turbine's respective spatial envelope.

Closer spacing is possible depending on the turbine model, the conditions at the site, and how the site will be operated. Airflows slow as they approach an obstacle, known as the 'blockage effect', reducing available wind power by 2% for the turbines in front of other turbines.

== Onshore ==
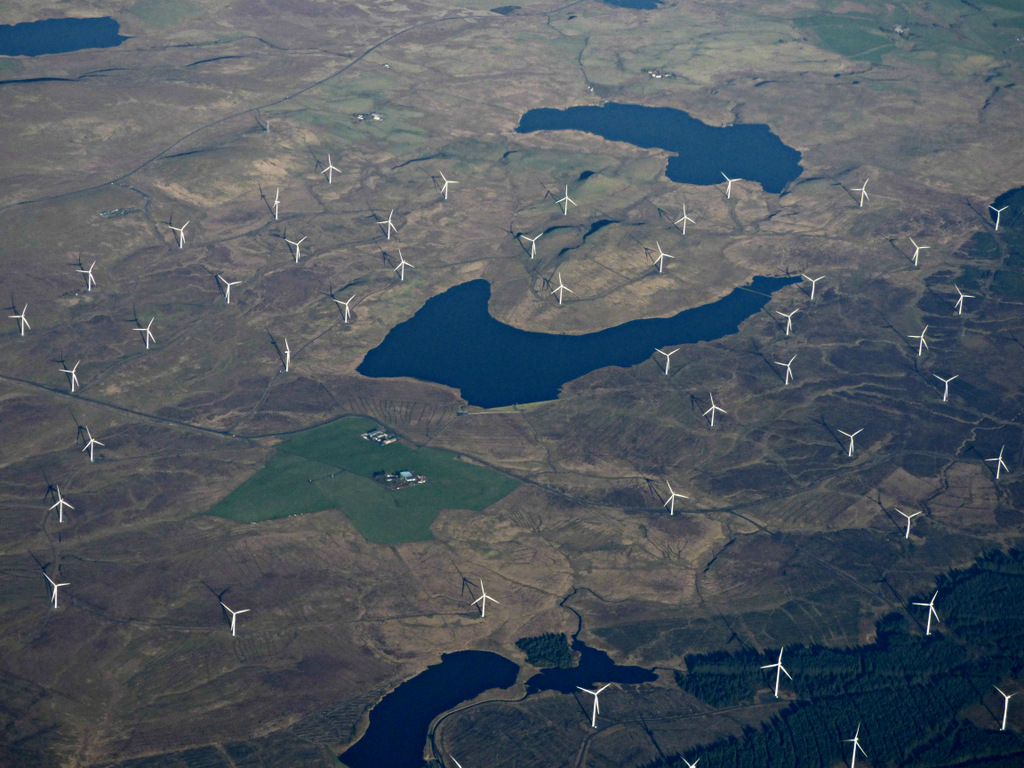
An aerial view of Whitelee Wind Farm, the largest onshore wind farm in the UK and second-largest in Europe

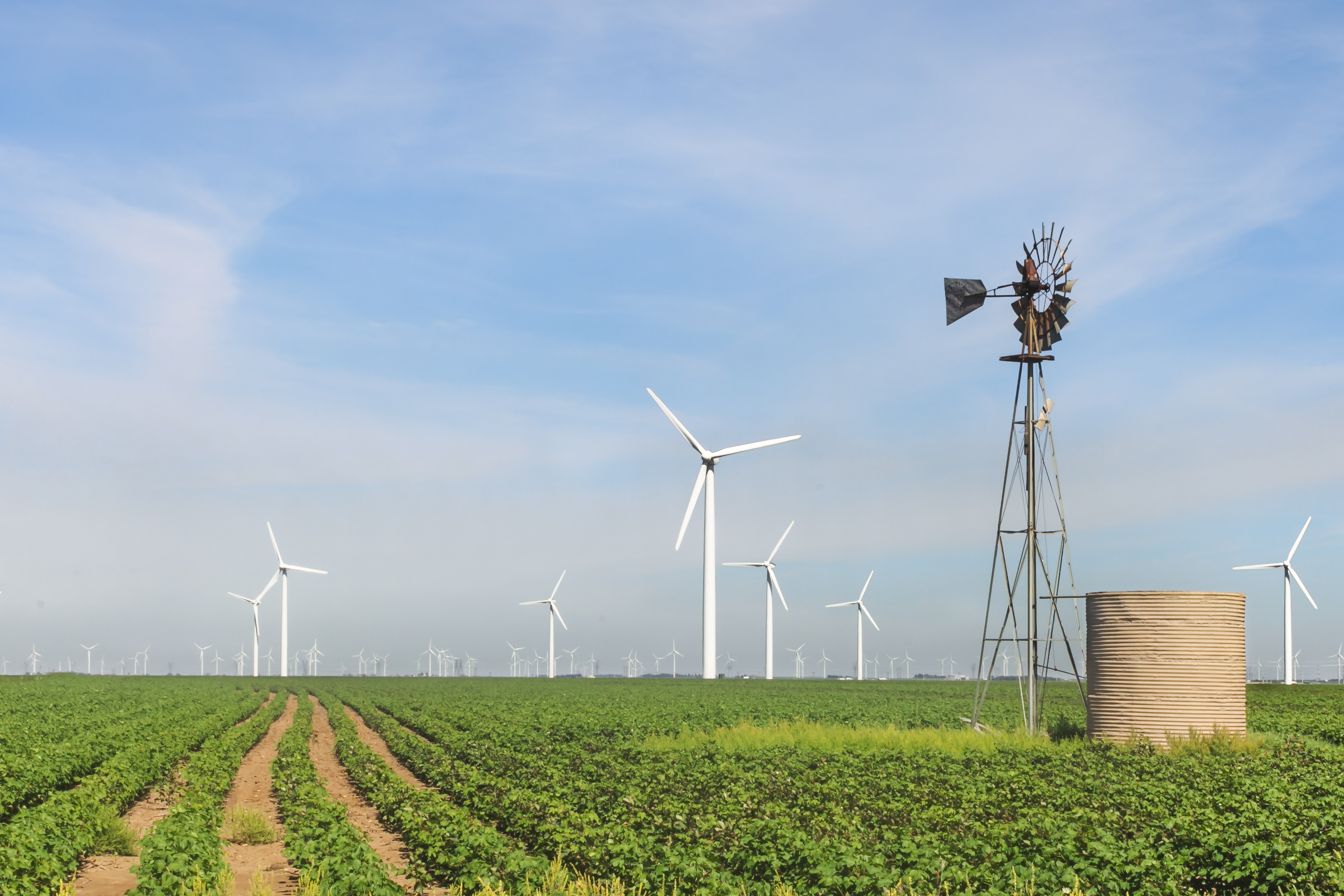
Roscoe Wind Farm, an onshore wind farm, in West Texas

The capacity of the world's first wind farm was 0.6 MW, produced by 20 wind turbines rated at 30 kilowatts each, installed on the shoulder of Crotched Mountain in southern New Hampshire in December 1980.

World's largest onshore wind farms
Wind farm	Present capacity (MW)	Country	Notes
Gansu Wind Farm	30,000	China	
Zhang Jiakou	21,235	China	
Urat Zhongqi, Bayannur City	2,100	China	
M'Intyre & Herries Range QLD	2,023	Australia	
Markbygden Wind Farm	2,000	Sweden	
Hami Wind Farm	2,000	China	
Damao Qi, Baotou City	1,600	China	
Muppandal Wind farm	1,500	India	
Alta (Oak Creek-Mojave)	1,320	United States	
Complexo Eólico Lagoa dos Ventos	1,112	Brazil	
Jaisalmer Wind Park	1,064	India	
Complexo Eólico Rio do Vento	1,038	Brazil	
Hongshagang, Town, Minqin County	1,000	China	
Kailu, Tongliao	1,000	China	
Chengde	1,000	China	
Shepherds Flat Wind Farm	845	United States	
Meadow Lake Wind Farm	801	United States	
Roscoe Wind Farm	781.5	United States	
Horse Hollow Wind Energy Center	735.5	United States	
Capricorn Ridge Wind Farm	662.5	United States	
Fântânele-Cogealac Wind Farm	600	Romania	
Fowler Ridge Wind Farm	599.8	United States	
Sweetwater Wind Farm	585.3	United States	
Complexo Eólico Chuí	582	Brazil	
Zarafara Wind Farm	545	Egypt	
Whitelee Wind Farm	539	United Kingdom	
Buffalo Gap Wind Farm	523.3	United States	
Dabancheng Wind Farm	500	China	
Panther Creek Wind Farm	458	United States	

Onshore turbine installations in hilly or mountainous regions tend to be on ridges generally three kilometres or more inland from the nearest shoreline. This is done to exploit the topographic acceleration as the wind accelerates over a ridge. The additional wind speeds gained in this way can increase energy produced because more wind goes through the turbines. The exact position of each turbine matters, because a difference of 30 metres could potentially double output. This careful placement is referred to as 'micro-siting'.

== Offshore ==
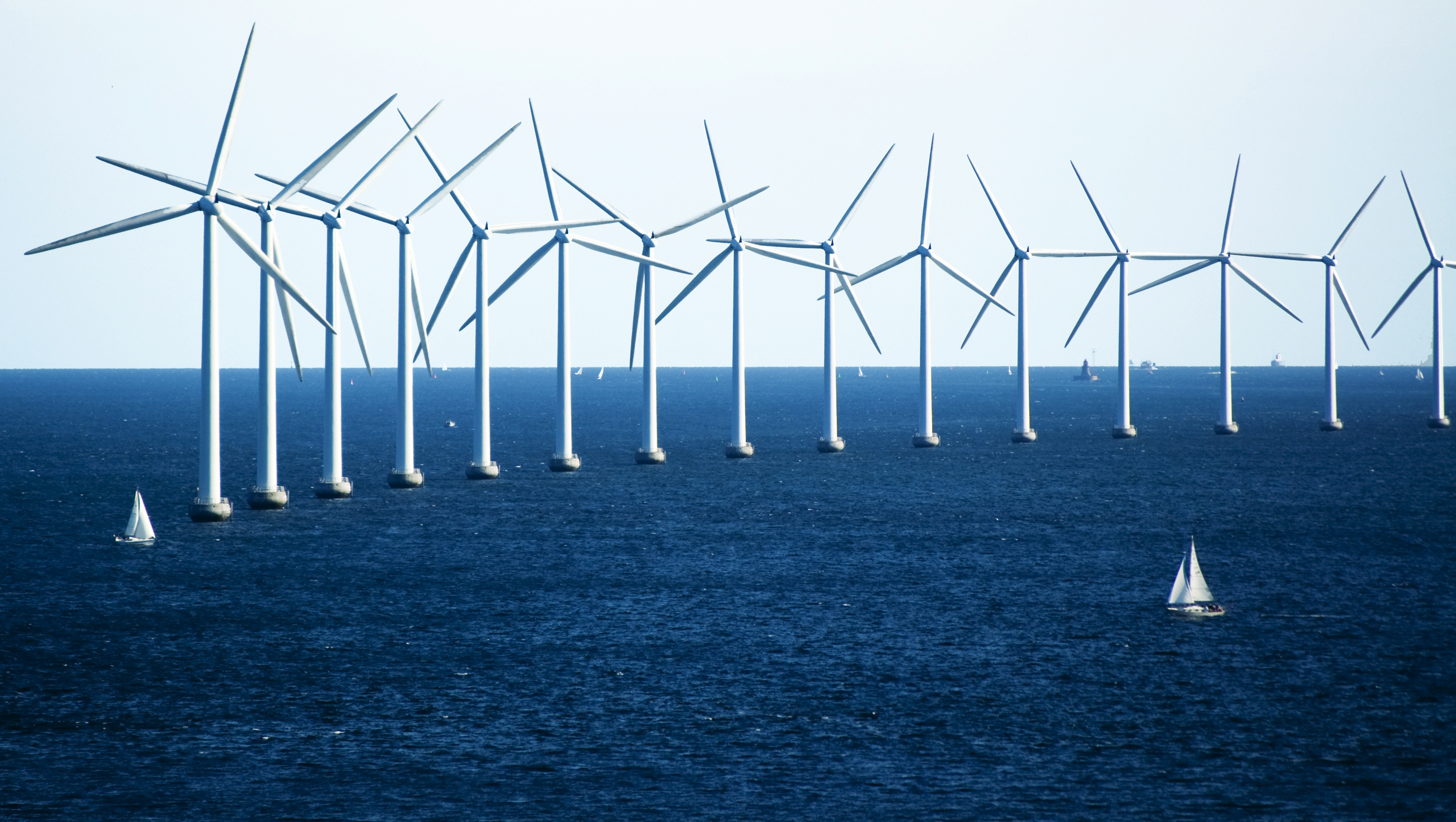
Offshore wind turbines near Copenhagen, Denmark

Europe is the leader in offshore wind energy, with the first offshore wind farm (Vindeby) being installed in Denmark in 1991. As of 2010, there were 39 offshore wind farms in waters off Belgium, Denmark, Finland, Germany, Ireland, the Netherlands, Norway, Sweden, and the United Kingdom, with a combined operating capacity of 2,396 MW. More than 100 GW (or 100,000 MW) of offshore projects are proposed or under development in Europe. The European Wind Energy Association set a target of 40 GW installed by 2020 and 150 GW by 2030.

As of 2017, The Walney Wind Farm in the United Kingdom is the largest offshore wind farm in the world at 659 MW, followed by the London Array (630 MW) also in the UK.

Offshore wind turbines are less obtrusive than turbines on land, as their apparent size and noise is mitigated by distance. Because water has less surface roughness than land (especially deeper water), the average wind speed is usually considerably higher over open water. Capacity factors (utilisation rates) are considerably higher than for onshore locations.

The province of Ontario, Canada is pursuing several proposed locations in the Great Lakes, including the suspended Trillium Power Wind 1 approximately 20 km from shore and over 400 MW in size. Other Canadian projects include one on the Pacific west coast. In 2010, there were no offshore wind farms in the United States, but projects were under development in wind-rich areas of the East Coast, Great Lakes, and Pacific coast; and in late 2016 the Block Island Wind Farm was commissioned.

Offshore windfarms, including floating windfarms, provide a small but growing fraction of total windfarm power generation. Such power generation capacity must grow substantially to help meet the IEA's Net Zero by 2050 pathway to combat climate change.

Installation and service / maintenance of off-shore wind farms are a challenge for technology and economic operation of a wind farm. As of 2015, there are 20 jackup vessels for lifting components, but few can lift sizes above 5 MW. Service vessels have to be operated nearly 24/7 (availability higher than 80% of time) to get sufficient amortisation from the wind turbines. Therefore, special fast service vehicles for installation (like Wind Turbine Shuttle) as well as for maintenance (including heave compensation and heave compensated working platforms to allow the service staff to enter the wind turbine also at difficult weather conditions) are required. So-called inertial and optical based Ship Stabilization and Motion Control systems (iSSMC) are used for that.

The world's 10 largest offshore wind farms
Wind farm	Capacity (MW)	Country	Turbines & model	Commissioned	Ref.
Hornsea Wind Farm	1218	United Kingdom	174 x Siemens Gamesa SWT-7.0-154	2019	
Walney Wind Farm	1026	United Kingdom	102 × Siemens SWT-3.6; 40 × Vestas V164; 47 × Siemens Gamesa 7 MW	2018	
Triton Knoll Wind Farm	857	United Kingdom	90 × Vestas V164 9.5 MW	2021	
Jiangsu Qidong	802	China	134 × (seven different models from four domestic manufacturers)	2021	
Borssele I & II	752	Netherlands	94 × Siemens Gamesa 8MW	2020	
Borssele III & IV	731.5	Netherlands	77 × Vestas V164 9.5MW	2021	
East Anglia Array	714	United Kingdom	102 × Siemens Gamesa 7MW	2020	
London Array	630	United Kingdom	175 × Siemens Gamesa SWT-3.6-120	2013	
Kriegers Flak	605	Denmark	72 × Siemens Gamesa SWT-8.4-167	2021	
Gemini Wind Farm	600	Netherlands	150 × Siemens Gamesa SWT-4.0	2017	

== Experimental and proposed wind farms ==
Experimental wind farms consisting of a single wind turbine for testing purposes have been built. One such installation is Østerild Wind Turbine Test Field.

Airborne wind farms have been envisaged. Such wind farms are a group of airborne wind energy systems located close to each other connected to the grid at the same point.

Wind farms consisting of diverse wind turbines have been proposed in order to efficiently use wider ranges of wind speeds. Such wind farms are proposed to be projected under two criteria: maximization of the energy produced by the farm and minimization of its costs.

== By region ==
=== Australia ===
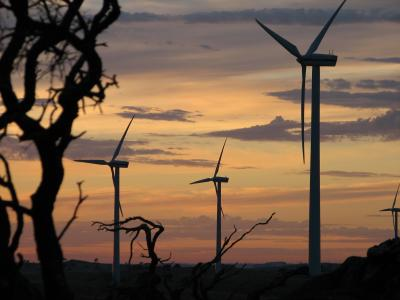
The Australian Canunda Wind Farm, South Australia at sunrise

The Australian Greens have been significant supporters of Australian wind farms, however the party's previous leader Bob Brown and former leader Richard Di Natale have now both expressed concerns about environmental aspects of wind turbines, particularly the potential danger they impose for birds.

=== Brazil ===
In July 2022 Brazil reached 22 GW of installed wind power in about 750 wind farms In 2021 Brazil was the seventh country in the world in terms of installed wind power (21 GW), and the 4th largest producer of wind energy in the world (72 TWh), behind China, USA and Germany. The largest wind farm in the country is the Complexo eólico Lagoa dos Ventos in the State of Piauí, onshore with a current capacity of 1,000 MW being expanded to 1,500 MW.

=== Canada ===
Wind energy, alongside solar and energy storage, forms an expanding sector of the country's renewable grid, with total combined wind, solar, and storage capacity reaching approximately 25 GW nationally. Wind farms operate across 11 provinces and territories, with Nunavut and the Northwest Territories being the exceptions.

The vast majority of the country's wind power capacity is concentrated in three major regions. Ontario has historically been a pioneer in commercial wind deployment, featuring major installations such as the Wolfe Island and K2 wind facilities. Quebec is home to multi-phase utility-scale projects, including the Seigneurie de Beaupré and Rivière du Moulin wind farms. Meanwhile, Alberta is experiencing expansion driven by private corporate power purchase agreements, highlighted by major projects like the 466 MW Buffalo Plains wind farm, which is the province's largest. Additional contributions to the national grid come from Nova Scotia, British Columbia, New Brunswick, Saskatchewan, Prince Edward Island, Manitoba, Newfoundland and Labrador, and Yukon.

=== China ===
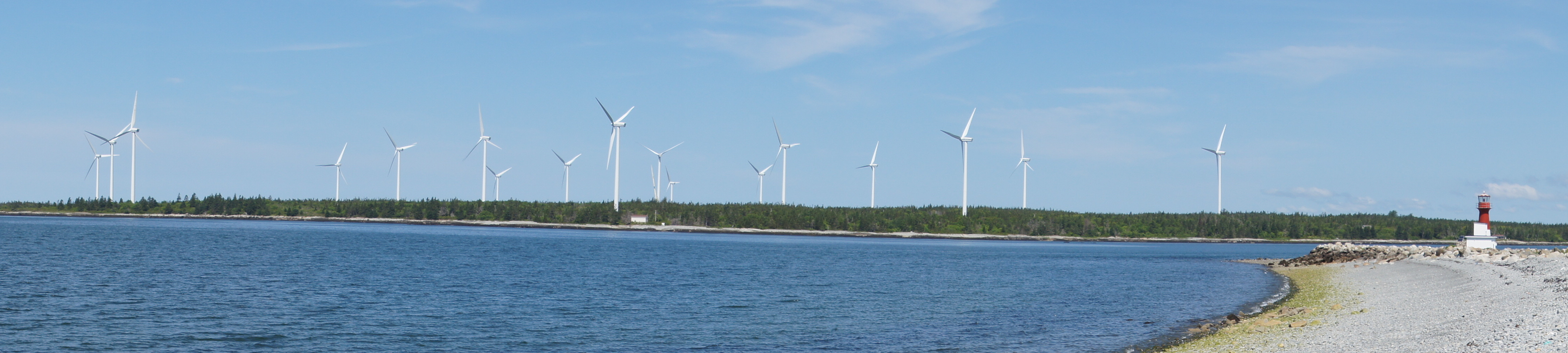
The Pubnico Wind Farm taken from Beach Point, Lower East Pubnico, Nova Scotia

In just five years, China leapfrogged the rest of the world in wind energy production, going from 2,599 MW of capacity in 2006 to 62,733 MW at the end of 2011. However, the rapid growth outpaced China's infrastructure and new construction slowed significantly in 2012.

At the end of 2009, wind power in China accounted for 25.1 gigawatts (GW) of electricity generating capacity, and China has identified wind power as a key growth component of the country's economy. With its large land mass and long coastline, China has exceptional wind resources.

Researchers from Harvard and Tsinghua University have found that China could meet all of their electricity demands from wind power by 2030.

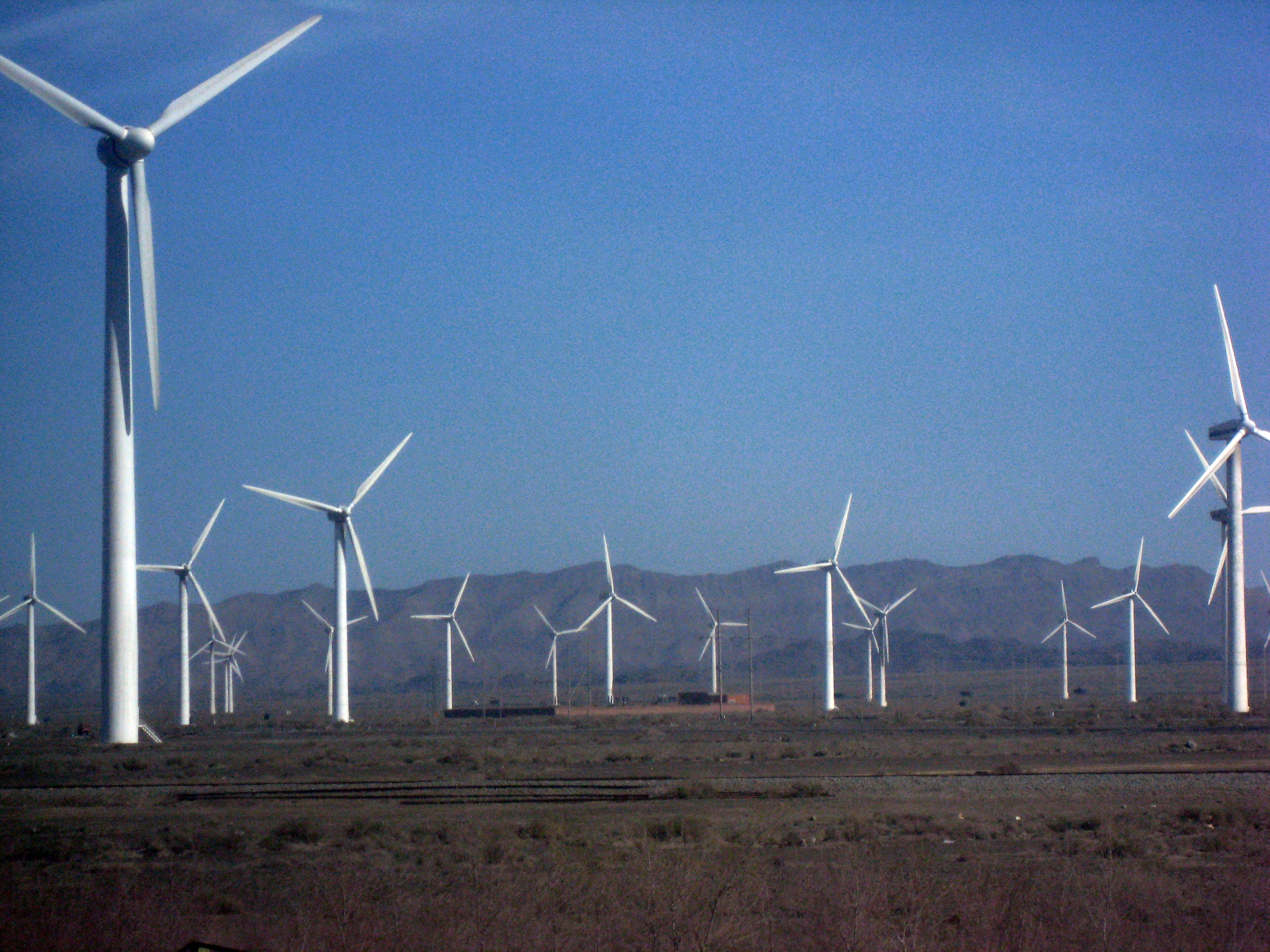
Wind farm in Xinjiang, China

By the end of 2008, at least 15 Chinese companies were commercially producing wind turbines and several dozen more were producing components. Turbine sizes of 1.5 MW to 3 MW became common. Leading wind power companies in China were Goldwind, Dongfang Electric, and Sinovel along with most major foreign wind turbine manufacturers. China also increased production of small-scale wind turbines to about 80,000 turbines (80 MW) in 2008. Through all these developments, the Chinese wind industry appeared unaffected by the 2008 financial crisis, according to industry observers.

According to the Global Wind Energy Council, the development of wind energy in China, in terms of scale and rhythm, is unparalleled in the world. The National People's Congress permanent committee passed a law that requires the Chinese energy companies to purchase all the electricity produced by the renewable energy sector.

=== Ethiopia ===
Ethiopia has emerged as a pioneer in utility-scale wind energy development within East Africa, leveraging high wind power potential across the East African Rift system to diversify a national grid historically dominated by hydropower.

Key wind installations contributing to the country's generation portfolio include:

- Adama Wind Farms (Adama I and II): Situated near the Rift Valley, these multi-phase projects, including the 153 MW Adama II installation, significantly expanded regional generation capacity.
- Ashegoda Wind Farm: Located in the northern Tigray region, it represents one of the country's earliest large-scale wind infrastructure investments.
- Assela and Aysha Wind Projects: Newer utility-scale additions, such as the 100.5 MW Assela farm and major multi-hundred-megawatt developments like Aysha backed by independent power producers (IPPs) and multilateral financing, have scaled Ethiopia's total operational wind capacity past 500 MW.

=== Europe ===
In 2011 the European Union had a total installed wind capacity of 93,957 MW. Germany had the third-largest capacity in the world (after China and the United States), with an installed capacity of 29,060 MW at the end of 2011. Spain had 21,674 MW, and Italy and France each had between 6,000 and 7,000 MW. By January 2014, the UK installed capacity was 10,495 MW. But energy production can be different from capacity – in 2010, Spain had the highest European wind power production with 43 TWh compared to Germany's 35 TWh. In addition to the 'London Array', an off-shore wind farm in the Thames Estuary in the United Kingdom, with a capacity of 630 MW (the world's largest off-shore wind farm when built), other large wind farms in Europe include Fântânele-Cogealac Wind Farm near Constanța, Romania with 600 MW capacity, and Whitelee Wind Farm near Glasgow, Scotland which has a total capacity of 539 MW.

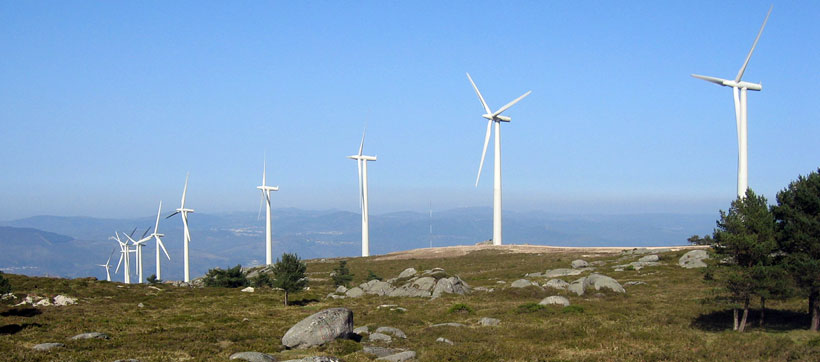
A wind farm in a mountainous area in Galicia, Spain

An important limiting factor of wind power is variable power generated by wind farms. In most locations the wind blows only part of the time, which means that there has to be back-up capacity of dispatchable generation capacity to cover periods that the wind is not blowing. To address this issue it has been proposed to create a "supergrid" to connect national grids together across western Europe, ranging from Denmark across the southern North Sea to England and the Celtic Sea to Ireland, and further south to France and Spain especially in Higueruela which was for some time the biggest wind farm in the world. The idea is that by the time a low pressure area has moved away from Denmark to the Baltic Sea the next low appears off the coast of Ireland. Therefore, while it is true that the wind is not blowing everywhere all of the time, it will tend to be blowing somewhere.

In July 2022, Seagreen, the world's deepest fixed-bottom wind farm, became operative. Located 26 miles off the Angus coastline, in Scotland, it has 114 turbines that generate 1.1 gigawatts (GW) of electricity.

=== India ===
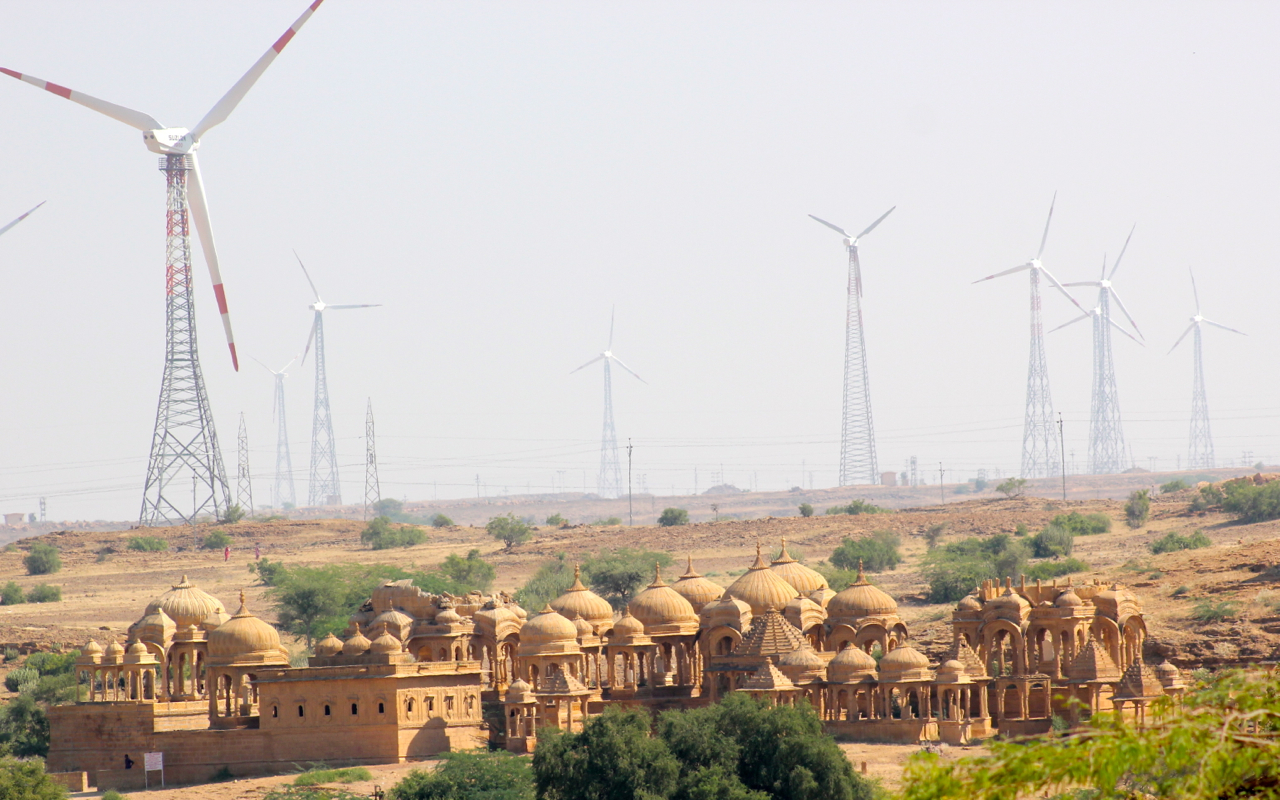
A wind farm overlooking Bada Bagh, India

India has the fifth largest installed wind power capacity in the world. As of March 2025, the installed capacity of wind power was 50037.82 MW mainly spread across Tamil Nadu state (11739.91 MW) and Gujarat state (12677.48 MW). Wind power accounts nearly 8.5% of India's total installed power generation capacity, and it generates 1.6% of the country's power. They are followed by strong regional contributors like Karnataka, Maharashtra, and Rajasthan. Nationally, wind energy continues to play a vital role in India's broader clean energy transition, complemented by the rapid expansion of wind-solar hybrid parks and major transmission upgrades under the Green Energy Corridor framework.

=== Japan ===
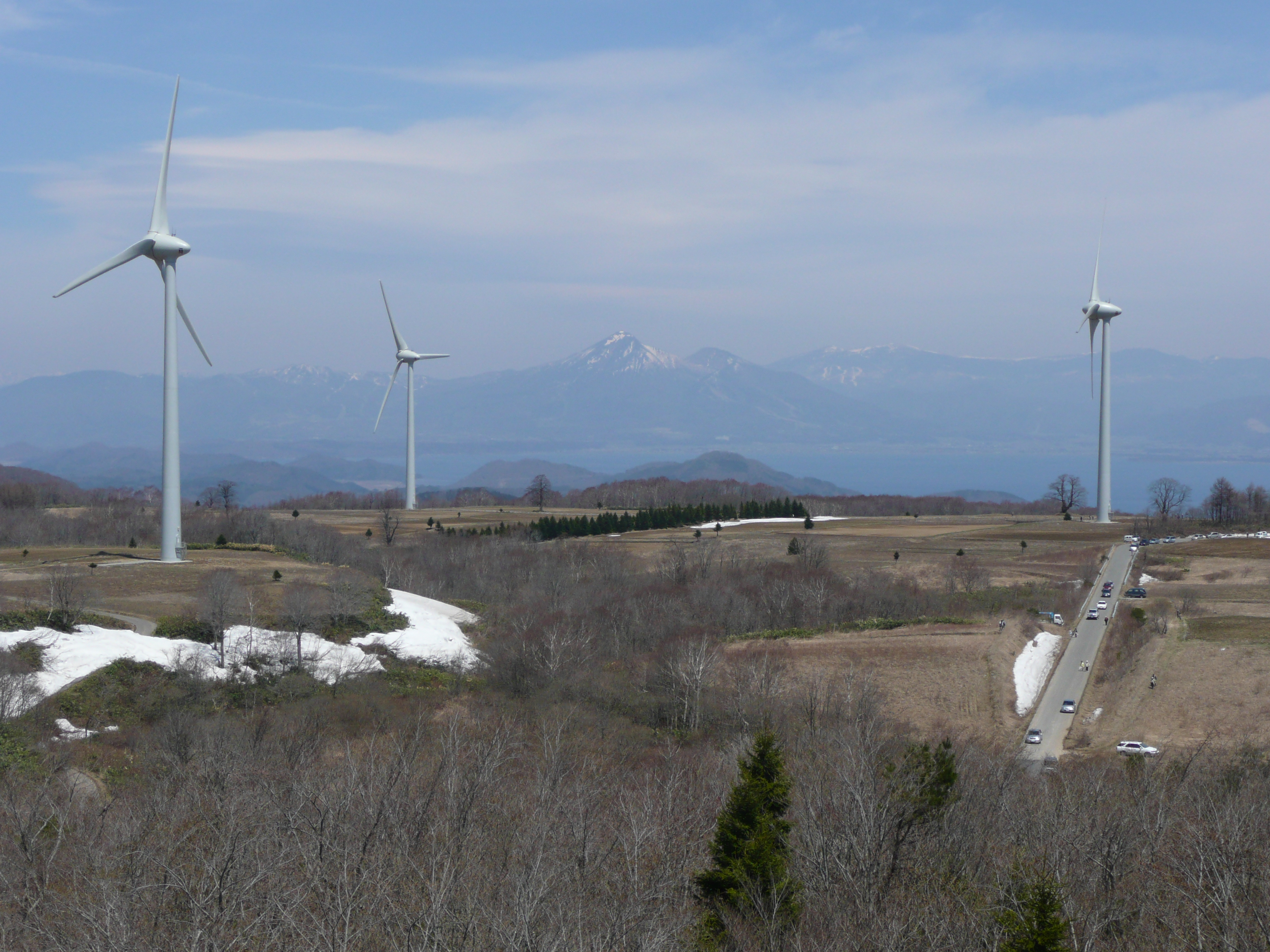
Turbines at the Nunobiki Plateau Wind Farm, one of the largest wind farms in Japan, with 33 turbines

In Japan's electricity sector, wind power generates a small proportion of the country's electricity. It has been estimated that Japan has the potential for 144 gigawatts (GW) for onshore wind and 608 GW of offshore wind capacity. As of 2023, the country had a total installed capacity of 5.2 GW.

As of 2018, government targets for wind power deployment were relatively low when compared to other countries, at 1.7% of electricity production by 2030.

In December 2020, the Japanese government announced plans to install up to 45 GW of offshore wind power by 2040.

=== Jordan ===
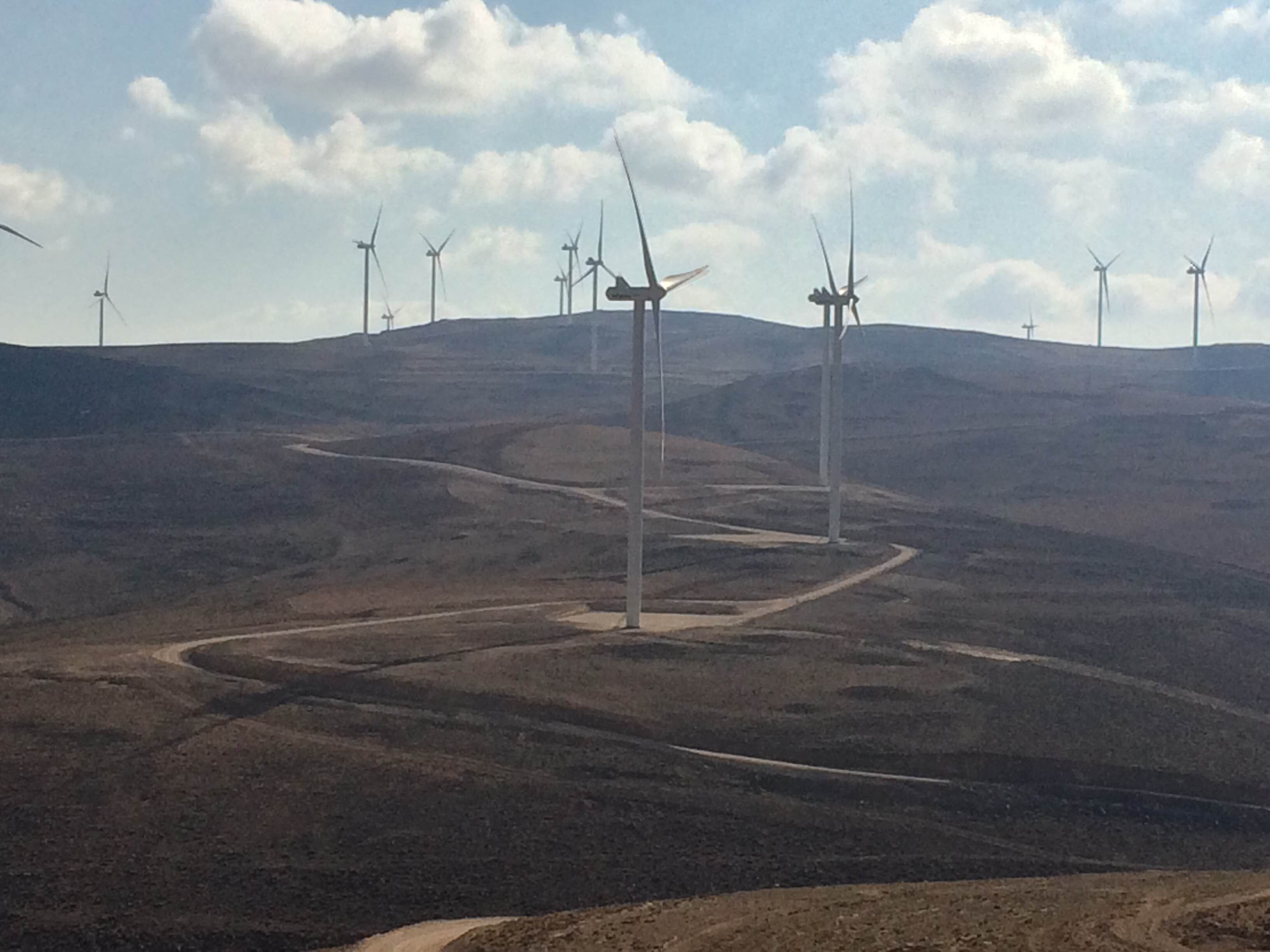
The Tafila Wind Farm in Jordan, is the first large scale wind farm in the region.

The 117 MW Tafila Wind Farm in Jordan was inaugurated in December 2015, and is the first large scale wind farm project in the region.

=== Morocco ===
Morocco has undertaken a vast wind energy program, to support the development of renewable energy and energy efficiency in the country. The Moroccan Integrated Wind Energy Project, spanning over a period of 10 years with a total investment estimated at $3.25 billion, will enable the country to bring the installed capacity, from wind energy, from 280 MW in 2010 to 2000 MW in 2020.

=== Pakistan ===
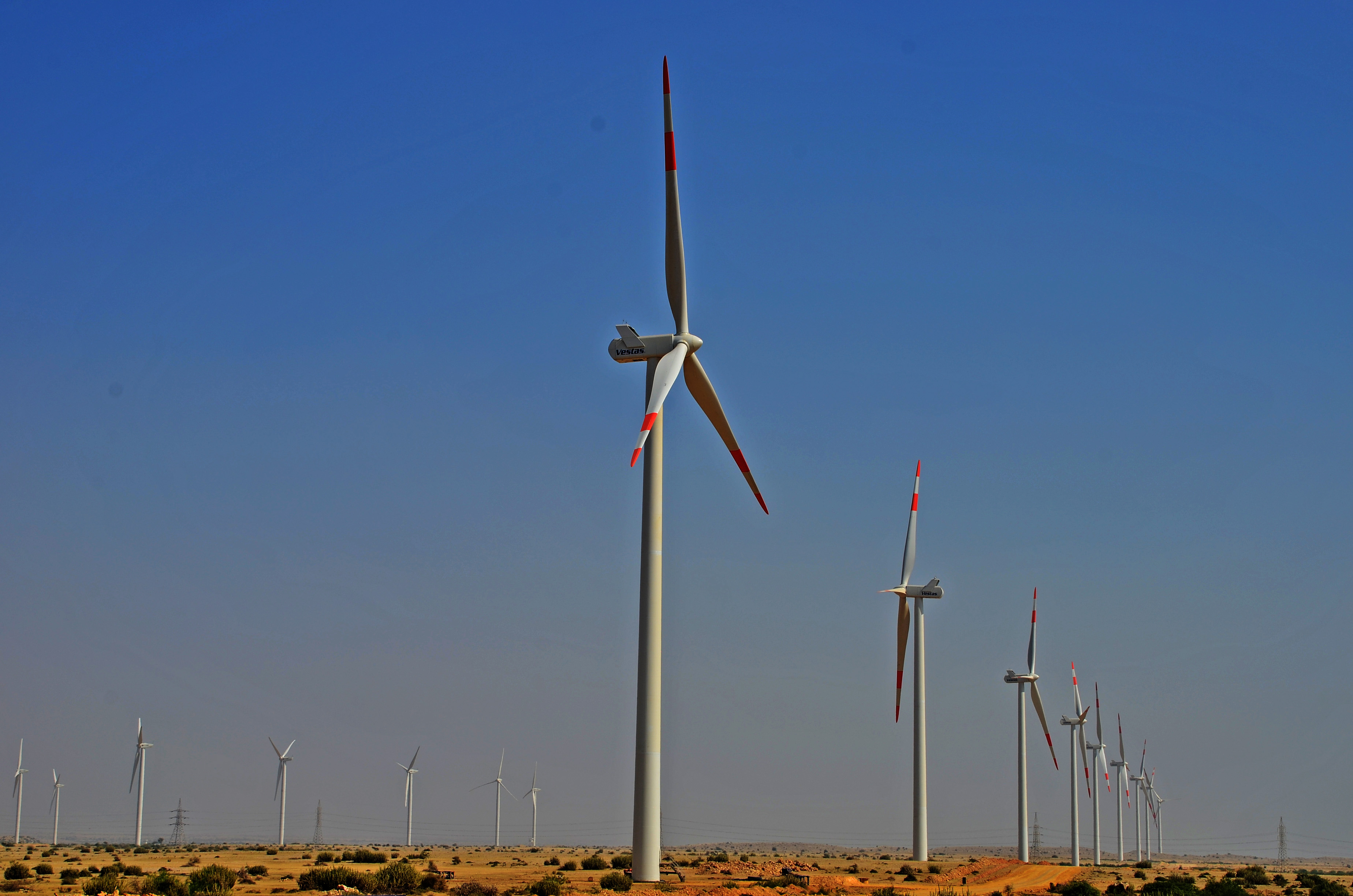
Jhimpir Wind Farm, Pakistan

Pakistan has wind corridors in Jhimpir, Gharo and Keti Bundar in Sindh province and is currently developing wind power plants in Jhimpir and Mirpur Sakro (District Thatta). The government of Pakistan decided to develop wind power energy sources due to problems supplying energy to the southern coastal regions of Sindh and Balochistan. The Zorlu Energy Putin Power Plant is the first wind power plant in Pakistan. The wind farm is being developed in Jhimpir, by Zorlu Energy Pakistan the local subsidiary of a Turkish company. The total cost of the project is $136 million. Completed in 2012, it has a total capacity of approximately 56MW. Fauji Fertilizer Company Energy Limited, has built a 49.5 MW wind Energy Farm at Jhimpir. Contract of supply of mechanical design was awarded to Nordex and Descon Engineering Limited. Nordex is a German wind turbine manufacturer. In the end of 2011 49.6 MW was expected to be completed. The Pakistani government also issued a Letter Of Interest in a 100 MW Wind power plant to FFCEL. The Pakistani government had plans to achieve electric power generation of up to 2500 MW by the end of 2015 from wind energy to bring down an energy shortage.

Currently four wind farms are operational (Fauji Fertilizer 49.5 MW (subsidiary of Fauji Foundation), Three Gorges 49.5 MW, Zorlu Energy Pakistan 56 MW, Sapphire Wind Power Company Limited 52.6 MW) and six are under construction phase ( Master Wind Energy Limited 52.6 MW, Sachal Energy Development Limited 49.5 MW, Yunus Energy Limited 49.5 MW, Gul Energy 49.5 MW, Metro Energy 49.5 MW, Tapal Energy) and were expected to achieve COD in 2017.

In the Gharo wind corridor, two wind farms (Foundation Energy 1 & II each 49.5 MW) are operational while two wind farms Tenaga Generasi Limited 49.5 MW and HydroChina Dawood Power Pvt. Limited 49.5 are under construction and expected to achieve COD in 2017.

According to a USAID report, Pakistan has the potential of producing 150,000 megawatts of wind energy, of which the Sindh corridor can produce 40,000 megawatts.

=== Philippines ===
The Philippines has the first windfarm in Southeast Asia. Located in the northern part of the country's biggest island, Luzon, alongside the seashore of Bangui, Ilocos Norte.

The wind farm uses 20 units of 70-metre (230 ft) high Vestas V82 1.65 MW wind turbines, arranged on a single row stretching along a nine-kilometre shoreline off Bangui Bay, facing the South China Sea.

Phase I of the NorthWind power project in Bangui Bay consists of 15 wind turbines, each capable of producing electricity up to a maximum capacity of 1.65 MW, for a total of 24.75 MW. The 15 on-shore turbines are spaced 326 metres (1,070 ft) apart, each 70 metres (230 ft) high, with 41 metres (135 ft) long blades, with a rotor diameter of 82 metres (269 ft) and a wind swept area of 5,281 square metres (56,840 sq ft). Phase II was completed in August 2008, and added 5 more wind turbines with the same capacity, and brought the total capacity to 33 MW. All 20 turbines describes a graceful arc reflecting the shoreline of Bangui Bay.

Adjacent municipalities of Burgos and Pagudpud followed with 50 and 27 wind turbines with a capacity of 3 MW each for a Total of 150 MW and 81 MW respectively.

Two other wind farms were built outside of Ilocos Norte, the Pililla Wind Farm in Rizal and the Mindoro Wind Farm near Puerto Galera in Oriental Mindoro.

=== Sri Lanka ===
Sri Lanka has received funding from the Asian Development Bank amounting to $300 million to invest in renewable energies. From this funding as well as $80 million from the Sri Lankan Government and $60 million from France's Agence Française de Développement, Sri Lanka was expected to build two 100MW wind farms from 2017 due to be completed by late 2020 in northern Sri Lanka.

=== South Africa ===
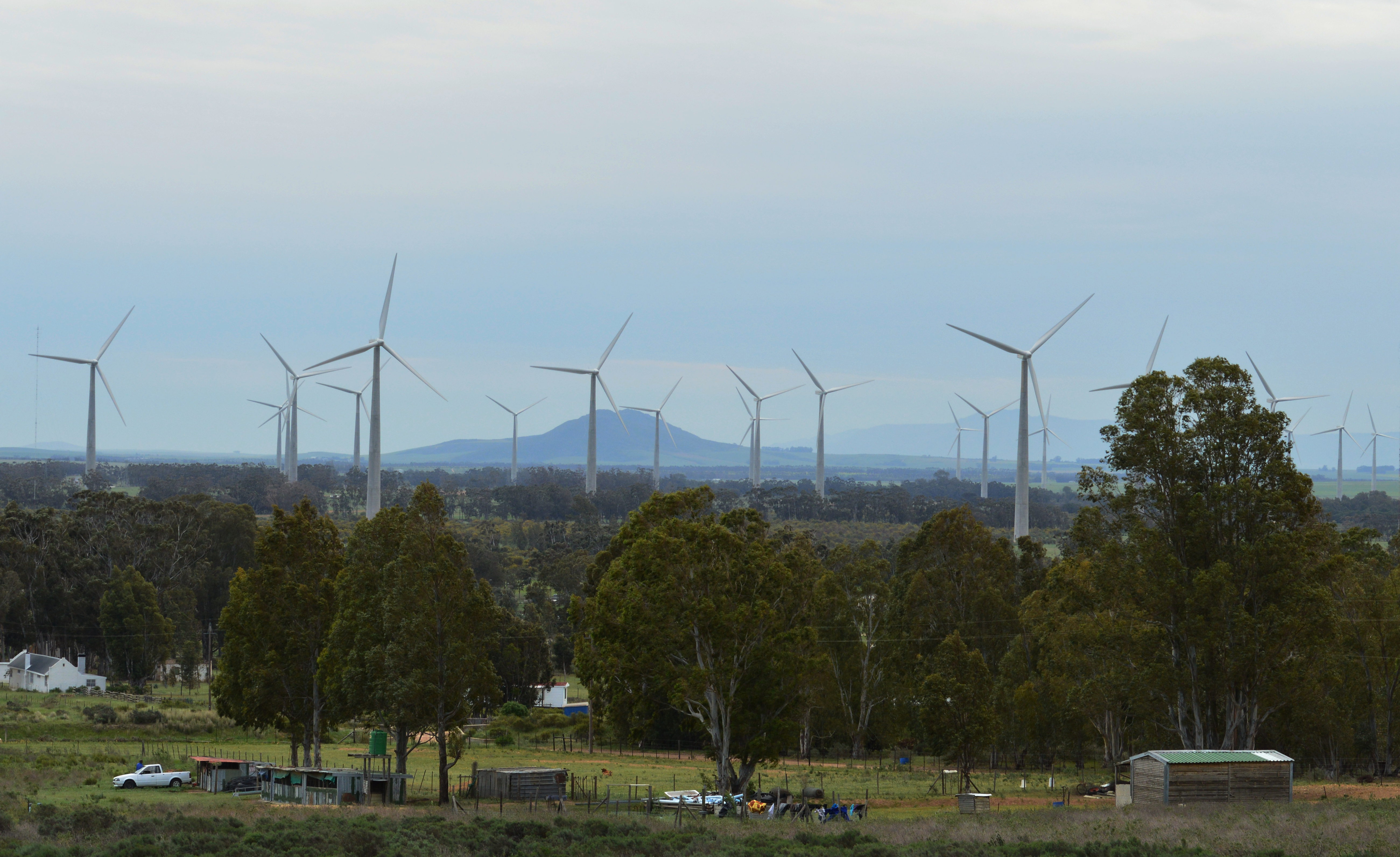
Gouda Wind Facility, South Africa

As of September 2015, a number of sizable wind farms have been constructed in South Africa mostly in the Western Cape region. These include the 100 MW Sere Wind Farm and the 138 MW Gouda Wind Facility.

Most future wind farms in South Africa are earmarked for locations along the Eastern Cape coastline. Eskom has constructed one small scale prototype windfarm at Klipheuwel in the Western Cape and another demonstrator site is near Darling with phase 1 completed. The first commercial wind farm, Coega Wind Farm in Port Elisabeth, was developed by the Belgian company Electrawinds.

In the years following, the country's wind sector scaled significantly under the government's Renewable Energy Independent Power Producer Procurement Programme (REIPPPP), adding major multi-megawatt facilities like the 140 MW Umsobomvu and 140 MW Hartebeesthoek wind farms in the Eastern and Northern Cape clusters, alongside corporate-backed private power purchase agreements.

=== UAE ===
Historically, the development of wind energy in the United Arab Emirates was limited compared to solar power due to the region's low average wind speeds. However, advancements in low-wind-speed turbine technology, material science, and aerodynamics enabled the country to harness commercial wind power. The UAE's initial foray into wind energy began with a small-scale 850-kilowatt demonstration turbine installed on Sir Bani Yas Island by Masdar. In late 2023, the UAE officially launched its utility-scale wind program with a total capacity of 103.5 megawatts, marking the first time commercial wind energy was successfully integrated into the nation's primary electricity grid. Developed by Masdar, this multi-site initiative includes projects distributed across various regions optimized for local wind patterns, featuring installations on Sir Bani Yas Island, Delma Island, Al Sila, and Al Halah in Fujairah.

Beyond its domestic grid, the UAE has heavily collaborated with Egypt to expand wind power generation in North Africa. Through strategic partnerships involving Masdar and Egyptian state entities, the two nations have advanced large-scale regional wind initiatives, such as massive multi-gigawatt wind farm developments in Egypt's high-potential Gulf of Suez corridor, aimed at accelerating renewable energy integration and meeting mutual climate targets.

=== United States ===
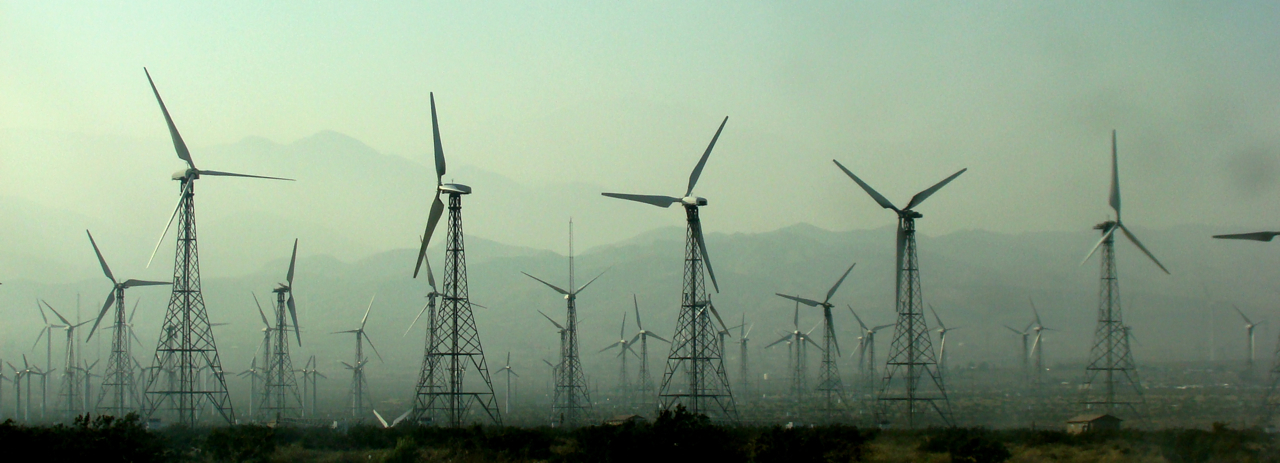
San Gorgonio Pass wind farm, California

U.S. wind power installed capacity in September 2019 exceeded 100,125 MW and supplies 6.94% of the nation's electricity. The majority of wind farms in the United States are located in the Central Plains, with slow expansion into other regions of the country.

Growth in 2008 channeled some $17 billion into the economy, positioning wind power as one of the leading sources of new power generation in the country, along with natural gas. Wind projects completed in 2008 accounted for about 42% of the entire new power-producing capacity added in the U.S. during the year.

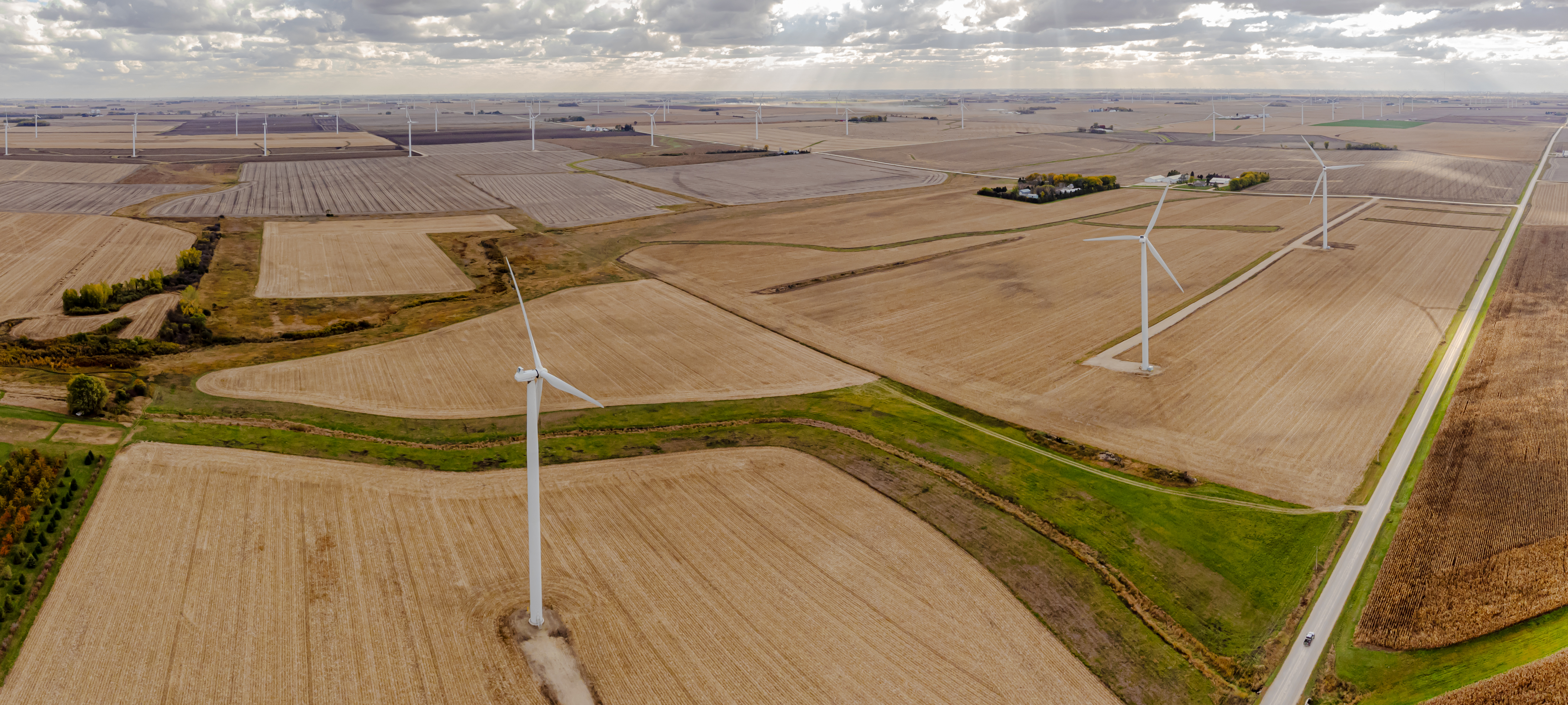
Northern Iowa wind farm

Texas, with 27,036 MW of capacity, has the most installed wind power capacity of any U.S. state, followed by Iowa with 8,965 MW and Oklahoma with 8,072 MW. Iowa is the leading state in terms of wind energy accounting for nearly 40% of total energy production in 2019. The Alta Wind Energy Center (1,020 MW) in California is the nation's largest wind farm in terms of capacity. Altamont Pass Wind Farm is the largest wind farm in the U.S. in terms of the number of individual turbines.

At the end of 2019, about 114,000 people were employed in the U.S. wind industry, and GE Energy was the largest domestic wind turbine manufacturer. In 2018, U.S. wind power provided enough electricity to power approximately 25 million homes, avoiding the emissions of 200 million tons of carbon.

=== USSR ===
In the USSR, plans to use wind energy were made in the early 1920s (the use of wind energy for irrigation systems in the Baku region was mentioned in a letter from V. I. Lenin in April 1921). The first wind power station in the USSR was built in 1931 in Balaklava. After the Axis invasion against the USSR it was destroyed during the occupation of the Crimean Peninsula by Axis invaders. In 1951, the Ural Electromechanical Plant began mass production of standard wind power stations for collective farms. In the period 1945-1970, more than 40 thousand wind turbines were made in the USSR, most of them were installed in rural areas on state farms and collective farms.

In the early 1980s, a plan was developed in the USSR to build wind power plants to provide energy to autonomous facilities in the Far North (the construction of which was to be carried out by military builders). Later, an experimental farm with several wind turbines was built on the bank of the river Desna in the Vyshgorod district of the Kiev region.

== Effect on environment and landscape ==
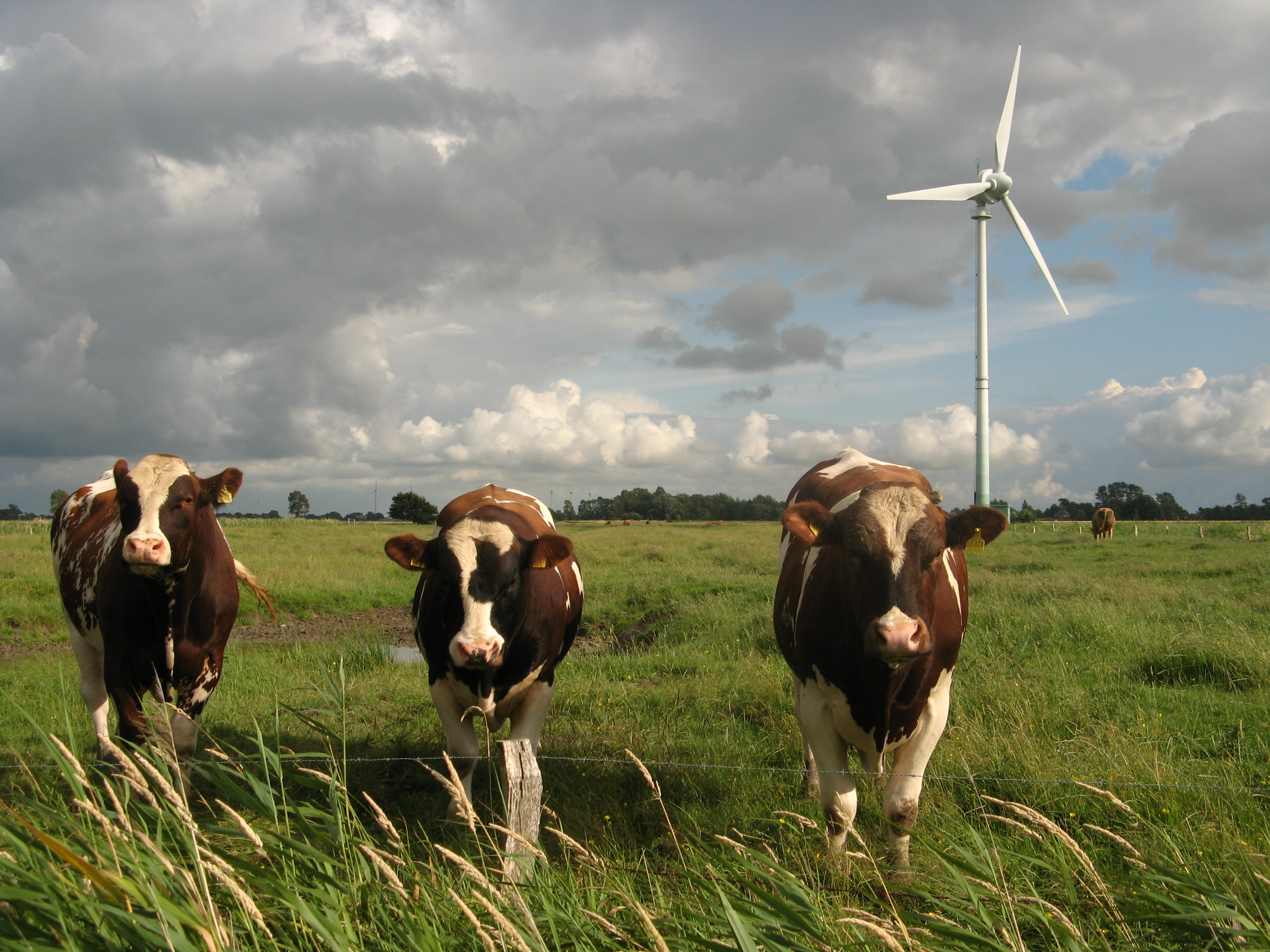
Livestock grazing near a wind turbine

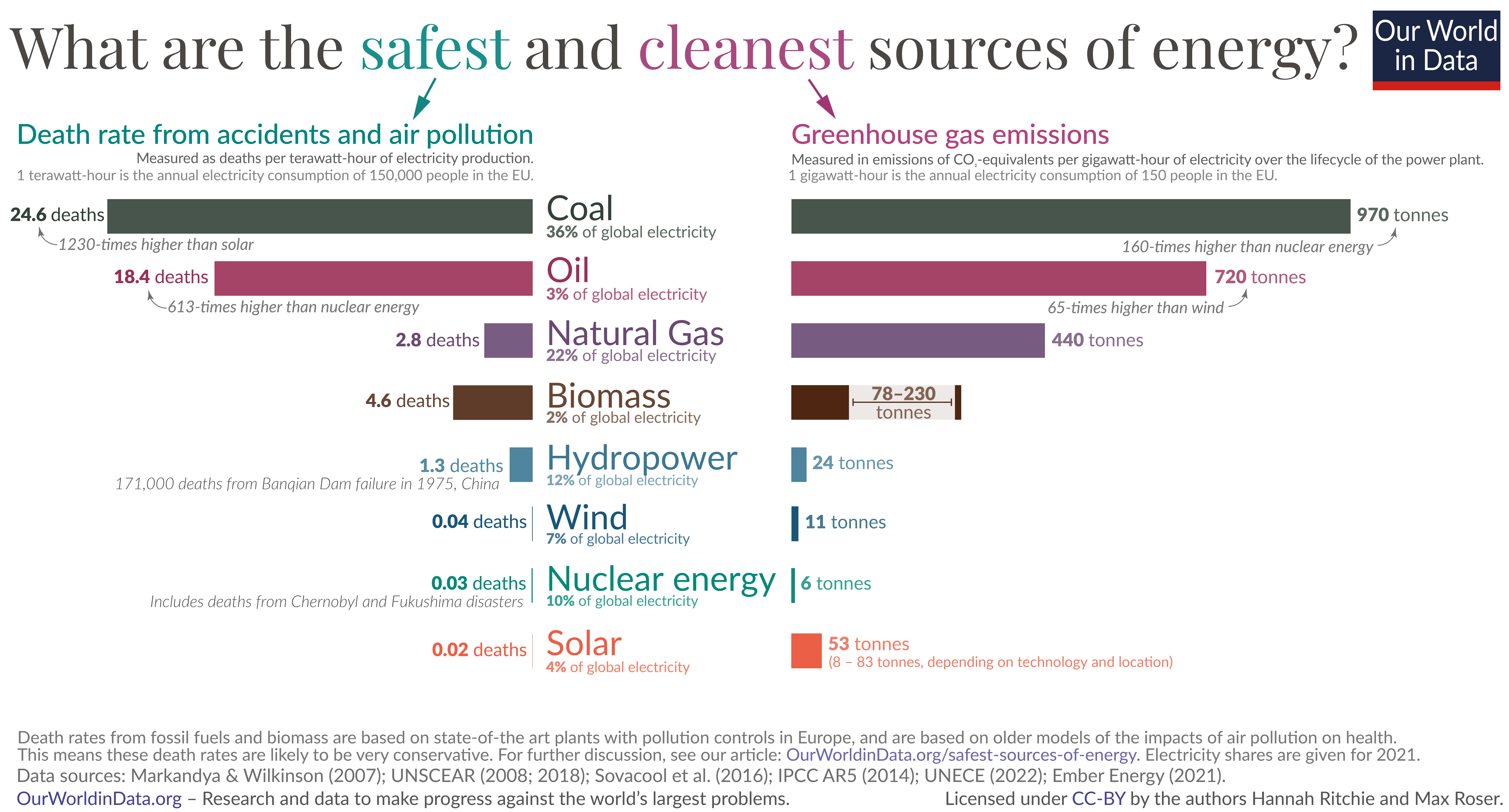
Per unit of energy, nuclear and wind power have minimal greenhouse emissions, and together with solar are the least deadly sources of energy.

The environmental impact of electricity generation from wind power is minor when compared to that of fossil fuel power. Wind power consumes no fuel, and emits no air pollution, unlike fossil fuels. Wind turbines have some of the lowest global warming potential per unit of electricity generated: far less greenhouse gas is emitted than for the average unit of electricity, so wind power helps limit climate change. Emissions from production of a turbine are recouped in less than a year of operation, as it replaces gas or coal power.

Onshore (on-land) wind farms can have a significant visual impact and impact on the landscape. Due to a very low surface power density and spacing requirements, wind farms typically need to be spread over more land than other power stations. Conflicts arise especially in scenic and culturally-important landscapes. Siting restrictions, such as setbacks, may be implemented to limit the impact. The land between the turbines and access roads can still be used for farming and grazing. Some wind farms are opposed for potentially spoiling protected scenic areas, archaeological landscapes and heritage sites.

Many wind turbine blades are made of fiberglass and some only had a lifetime of 10 to 20 years. Previously, there was no market for recycling these old blades, and they were commonly disposed of in landfills. Because blades are hollow, they take up a large volume compared to their mass. Since 2019, some landfill operators have begun requiring blades to be crushed before being landfilled. Blade end-of-life is complicated, and blades manufactured in the 2020s are more likely to be designed to be completely recyclable.

Wind turbines also generate noise. At a distance of 300 metres (980 ft) this may be around 45 dB, which is slightly louder than a refrigerator. At 1.5 km (1 mi) distance they become inaudible. Some people who live very close to wind turbines have reported negative health effects, but peer-reviewed research has generally not supported these claims. Pile-driving to construct non-floating wind farms is noisy underwater, but in operation offshore wind is much quieter than ships.

Habitat loss and fragmentation are the greatest potential impacts on wildlife of onshore wind farms, but the worldwide ecological impact is minimal. Thousands of birds and bats, including rare species, have been killed by wind turbine blades, though wind turbines are responsible for far fewer bird deaths than fossil-fueled power stations when climate change effects are included. The effects of wind turbines on birds can be mitigated with proper wildlife monitoring.

== Health effects ==
There have been multiple scientific, peer-reviewed studies into wind farm noise, which have concluded that infrasound from wind farms is not a hazard to human health and there is no verifiable evidence for 'Wind Turbine Syndrome' causing vibroacoustic disease, although some suggest further research might still be useful.

In a 2009 report about "Rural Wind Farms", a Standing Committee of the Parliament of New South Wales, Australia, recommended a minimum setback of two kilometres between wind turbines and neighboring houses (which may be waived by the affected neighbor) as a precautionary approach.

A 2014 paper suggests that the 'Wind Turbine Syndrome' is mainly caused by the nocebo effect and other psychological mechanisms. Australian science magazine Cosmos states that although the symptoms are real for those who suffer from the condition, doctors need to first eliminate known causes (such as pre-existing cancers or thyroid disease) before reaching definitive conclusions with the caveat that new technologies often bring new, previously unknown health risks.

== Effect on power grid ==
Utility-scale wind farms must have access to transmission lines to transport energy. The wind farm developer may be obliged to install extra equipment or control systems in the wind farm to meet the technical standards set by the operator of a transmission line.

The intermittent nature of wind power may pose complications for maintaining a stable power grid when wind farms provide a large percentage of electricity in any one region.

However wind farms are more resistant to military attack than thermal power plants as many missiles are needed to destroy them not just one.

In 2021, Assistant Professor at MIT, Priya Donti was awarded the U.S. Department of Energy Computational Science Graduate fellowship and the NSF Graduate Research fellowship for her efforts in co-founding a non-profit called Climate-Change AI.Donti focused her efforts on finding solutions using machine learning to adapt power grids that rely heavily on renewable energy. Donti is working on another project not yet released that has been noted to work 10 times faster than current technology and at a fraction of the price.

== Ground radar interference ==
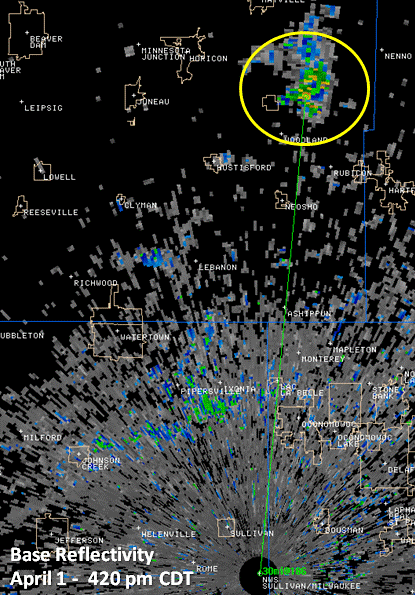
Wind farm interference (in yellow circle) on radar map

Wind farms may interfere with ground radar systems used for military, weather, and air traffic control. The large, rapidly moving blades of the turbines can return signals to the radar that can be mistaken as an aircraft or weather pattern. Actual aircraft and weather patterns around wind farms can be accurately detected, as there is no fundamental physical constraint preventing that, but aging radar infrastructure is significantly challenged with the task. The US military is using wind turbines on some bases, including Barstow near the radar test facility.

=== Effects ===
The level of interference is a function of the signal processors used within the radar, the speed of the aircraft and the relative orientation of wind turbines/aircraft with respect to the radar. An aircraft flying above the wind farm's turning blades could become impossible to detect because the blade tips can be moving at nearly aircraft velocity. Studies are currently being performed to determine the level of this interference and will be used in future site planning. Issues include masking (shadowing), clutter (noise), and signal alteration. Radar issues have stalled as much as 10,000 MW of projects in the USA.

Some very long range radars are not affected by wind farms.

=== Mitigation ===
Permanent problem solving include a non-initiation window to hide the turbines while still tracking aircraft over the wind farm, and a similar method mitigates the false returns. England's Newcastle Airport is using a short-term mitigation; to "blank" the turbines on the radar map with a software patch. Wind turbine blades using stealth technology are being developed to mitigate radar reflection problems for aviation. As well as stealth windfarms, the future development of infill radar systems could filter out the turbine interference.

A mobile radar system, the Lockheed Martin TPS-77, can distinguish between aircraft and wind turbines, and more than 170 TPS-77 radars are in use around the world.

The United States Federal Aviation Administration advises aircraft without position-reporting technologies such as transponders to avoid flight within 1 nautical mile (1.9 km; 1.2 mi) at all altitudes from wind turbine farms.

== Radio reception interference ==
There are reports of negative effects on radio and television reception in wind farm communities. Potential solutions include predictive interference modelling as a component of site selection.

== Effects on agriculture ==
A 2010 study found that in the immediate vicinity of wind farms, the climate is cooler during the day and slightly warmer during the night than the surrounding areas due to the turbulence generated by the blades.

In another study, an analysis carried out on corn and soybean crops in the central areas of the United States noted that the microclimate generated by wind turbines improves crops as it prevents the late spring and early autumn frosts, and also reduces the action of pathogenic fungi that grow on the leaves. Even at the height of summer heat, the lowering of 2.5–3 degrees above the crops due to turbulence caused by the blades can make a difference for the cultivation of corn.

== Effects on marine life ==
A December 2025 study conducted by Dalian Ocean University in China and Murdoch University in Australia indicates that marine life thrived and appears to have had a significant increase in benefits associated with an offshore wind farm in the northern Yellow Sea in China.

== See also ==
- Renewable energy commercialisation
- Sea breeze
- Sustainable energy
- Wave farm
