= Aveng =

Engineering company

Aveng Limited
- Type: Public
- Traded as: JSE: AEG
- Industry: Construction; Mining; Manufacturing
- Predecessor: Anglovaal Engineering
- Founded: 1880; 146 years ago
- Headquarters: Boksburg (Ekurhuleni), Gauteng, South Africa
- Area served: Africa, Australasia, Southeast Asia, South America
- Key people: Sean Flanagan (CEO); Adrian Macartney (CFO)
- Services: Contract mining, construction, infrastructure development, engineering
- Revenue: R11.2 billion (2019)
- Net income: -R170 million (2019)
- Total assets: R15.07 billion (2018)
- Number of employees: 5,211 (2022)
- Subsidiaries: Moolmans; McConnell Dowell
- Website: aveng.co.za

Aveng (formerly Anglovaal Engineering) is an international engineering led contractor focused on infrastructure, resources and contract mining and is listed on the Johannesburg Stock Exchange.

The company's origins lie in modest construction projects in South Africa, but Aveng now operates in engineering, infrastructure development, construction and contract mining across Australia, New Zealand & Pacific Islands, Singapore, Philippines, Indonesia, Malaysia and South Africa.

== History ==
=== Strategic review (2017-2019) ===
After Aveng reported large losses in September 2017, the company's CEO resigned. During the first half of FY2018, Aveng undertook a "robust strategic review" to fully evaluate their financial structure and operational performance to determine the key requirements for our medium- and long-term sustainability.

Aveng announced in 2019 a strategic plan that they would dispose of businesses that did not support the group's long-term strategy. Aveng intended to dispose of the Grinaker-LTA and Trident Steel operating divisions first, followed by the individual manufacturing businesses. Aveng sold its rail business, Aveng Rail formerly known as Lennings Rail, in October 2018. Earlier, Aveng had announced it would also sell its Jet Park and Vanderbijlpark properties. Sean Flanagan was named CEO later in 2019, taking over from interim CEO Eric Diack, who returned to the role of chairperson.

Aveng disposed of its Rand Roads business unit in July 2019. It told Reuters in 2019 it was selling non-core assets to focus on mining by 2020.

=== Divestitures (2020-2023) ===
In relation to non-payment on a bridge project, Aveng lodged a claim against Eskom in April 2020. UBS Group AG became a 6.39% shareholder in Aveng in October 2021.

In February 2022, while maintaining its placement on the JSE, Aveng narrowed its offshore listings to only bourses in Singapore and Australia. The company at the time described its two remaining core businesses as McConnell Dowell and Moolmans. It stated it still intended to sell Trident Steel. It completed that sale in October 2022.

Aveng Trident Steel at the time supplied a wide range of products to the distribution, mining, construction and automotive industries from its steel processing service centers and warehouses, and its manufacturing and fabrication plants.

Aveng completed a debt restructure and rights issue in March 2021. In 2022, Sean Flanagan remained CEO of Aveng. In 2022, Aveng lost arbitration involving penalties for missing construction deadlines regarding The Leonardo building in South Africa, concerning a contract from 2015 to 2019.

== Business and divisions ==
=== Core businesses ===
Construction and Engineering

- McConnell Dowell - a New Zealand-based major engineering, construction and maintenance contractor in the building, infrastructure, and resources sectors in Australia, New Zealand and Pacific Islands, Southeast Asia, and the Middle East.

Mining

- Moolmans - a South African operator in open cut contract mining across Africa.

== Major projects ==
- Gouda Wind Facility
- The Leonardo
- FNB Stadium

== See also ==
- Construction industry in South Africa
- List of companies traded on the JSE
- List of companies of South Africa
