= Gouda, South Africa =

Gouda
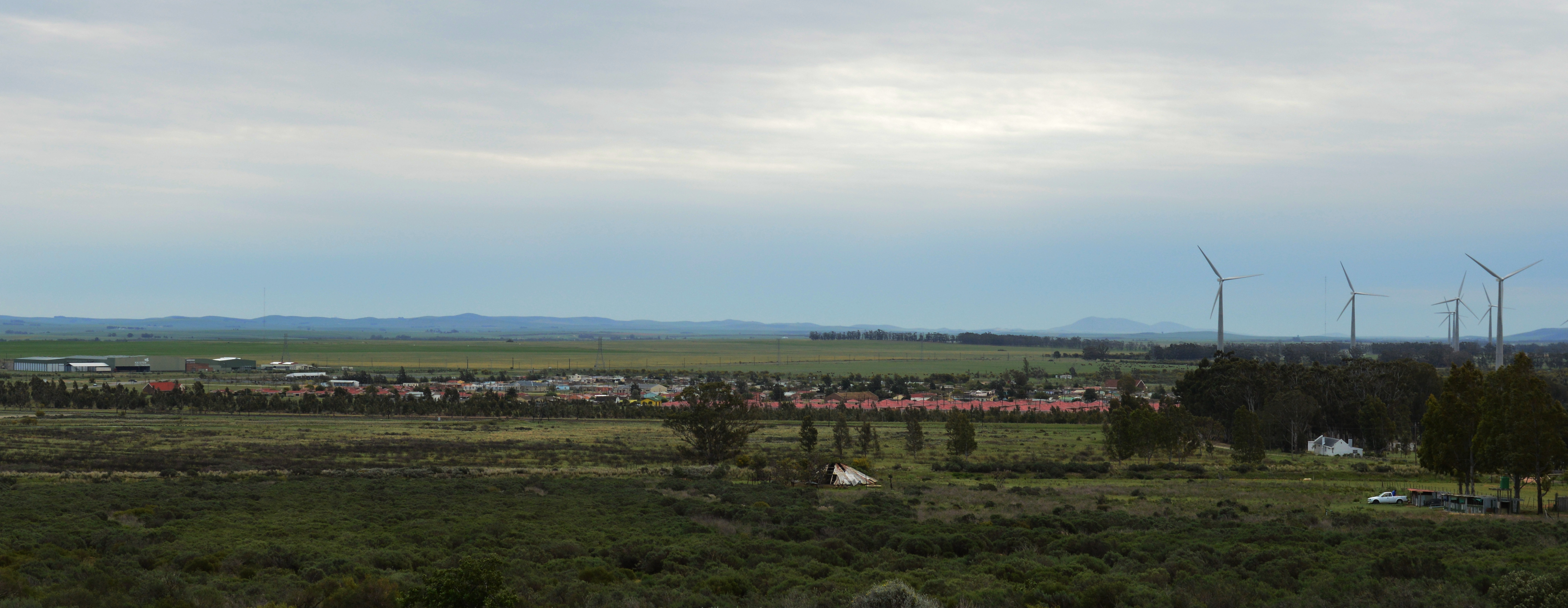
- A skyline of the town of Gouda in the Western Cape, South Africa. Part of the Gouda Wind Farm can be seen to the far right of the picture.

- Location within Western Cape Location within South Africa
- Coordinates: 33°18′S 19°02′E
- Country: South Africa
- Province: Western Cape
- District: Cape Winelands
- Municipality: Drakenstein

Area
  - Total: 7.65 km^{2} (2.95 sq mi)

Population (2011)
  - Total: 3,441
  - Density: 450/km^{2} (1,160/sq mi)

Racial makeup (2011)
  - Black African: 8.5%
  - Coloured: 90.0%
  - Indian/Asian: 0.2%
  - White: 1.3%
  - Other: 0.1%

First languages (2011)
  - Afrikaans: 90.7%
  - Xhosa: 4.9%
  - English: 1.6%
  - Other: 2.8%
- Time zone: UTC+2 (SAST)
- PO box: 6821
- Area code: 023

Gouda is a settlement in Cape Winelands District Municipality in the Western Cape province of South Africa.

The town lies some 38km south of Porterville, 14km west of Tulbagh and 61km north-west of Worcester. Prior to 1929, it was known as Porterville Road. Of Khoekhoen origin, the name Gouda is said to mean ‘antelope’. Another possible translation is ‘honey path’, ‘honey defile’. It is unrelated to the Dutch city of the same name.

However another historical explanation for the name says the village was originally a farm called "La Bonne Esperance" that was owned by three sisters who were originally from Holland. They donated farmland to establish a small town, as long as the town was called Gouda.

The 138 MW Gouda Wind Farm, opened in September 2015, is situated just outside the town.
