= ANZ Centre =

Office skyscraper in Auckland, New Zealand

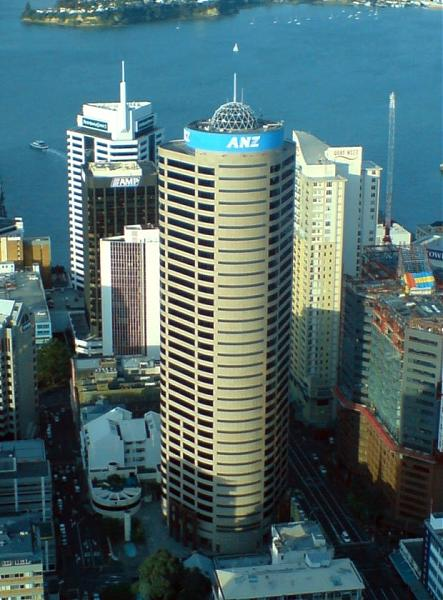
- ANZ Centre in March 2015

General information
- Status: Completed
- Type: Office
- Location: 23-29 Albert Street, Auckland, New Zealand
- Coordinates: 36°50′44.3″S 174°45′51.7″E
- Current tenants: ANZ Bank New Zealand
- Construction started: 1989
- Completed: 1991
- Renovated: 2013

Height
- Architectural: 153 m (502 ft)
- Tip: 153 m (502 ft)
- Roof: 143 m (469 ft)

Technical details
- Structural system: Concrete
- Floor count: 35
- Floor area: 31,929 m^{2} (343,681 sq ft)
- Lifts/elevators: 12

Design and construction
- Architecture firm: Hassell

The ANZ Centre is an office skyscraper located in Auckland, New Zealand. Constructed between 1989 and 1991, the building stands at a height of 153 m (502 ft) and features 35 floors. Located at 23-29 Albert Street, the building comprises 32 floors of office space and 5 floors dedicated to car parking. It encompasses a total floor area of 31,929 m^{2} (343,681 sq ft).

It was formerly known as the Coopers & Lybrand Building and before that as the Robert Jones Tower. Upon its completion, it was the tallest building in New Zealand and the entire region of the Polynesian Triangle from 1991 to 1999, until it was surpassed by The Ascott Metropolis. Today, it stands as the seventh-tallest building in New Zealand.

== Construction ==
The skyscraper was designed by the architecture firm Hassell. Construction of the skyscraper began in 1989 and was completed in 1991. The building stood prominently on the Auckland skyline until it was visually surpassed by the construction of the Sky Tower, which began in 1995 and was completed in 1997.

The ANZ Centre was refurbished in 2013 at a cost of NZ$76 million.

== Height discrepancies ==
The height of the ANZ Centre has been subject to varying figures and disputes across different architectural databases. The Skyscraper Center lists the total height as 143 m (469 ft), Google Earth measures the structure at 151 m (495 ft), and Precinct Properties lists the height as 153 m (502 ft). Given that Precinct Properties formerly owned the ANZ Centre from 1997 to 2021, their official documentation of 153 m (502 ft) is considered the most accurate measurement from absolute ground level to the top of the spire, whereas the 143 m (469 ft) figure accurately represents the total roof height without the spire.

== Gallery ==
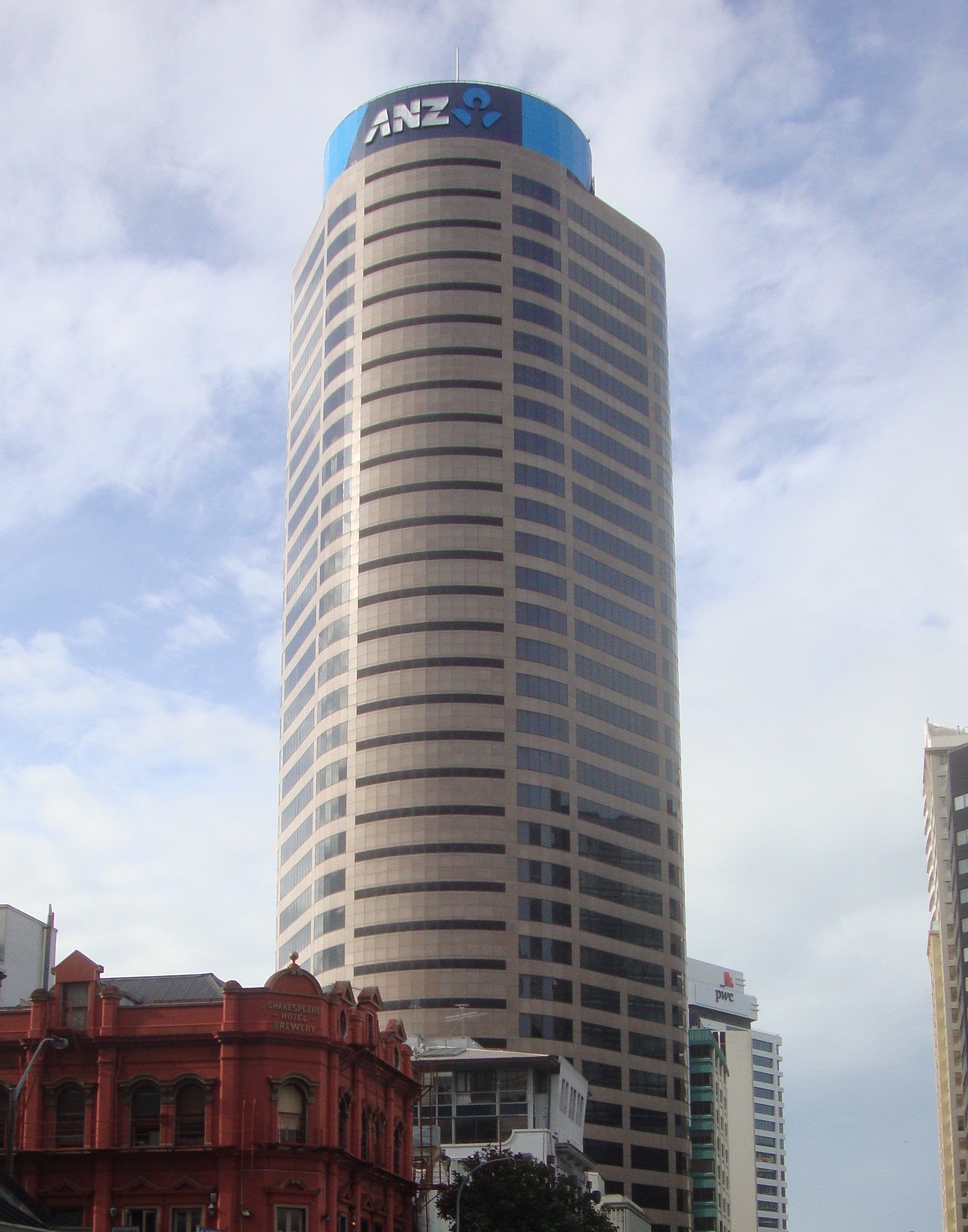
ANZ Centre in October 2011

ANZ Centre at dusk

== See also ==
- List of tallest structures in New Zealand
- List of tallest buildings in Auckland
