= Wind power in Illinois =

Electricity from wind in one U.S. state

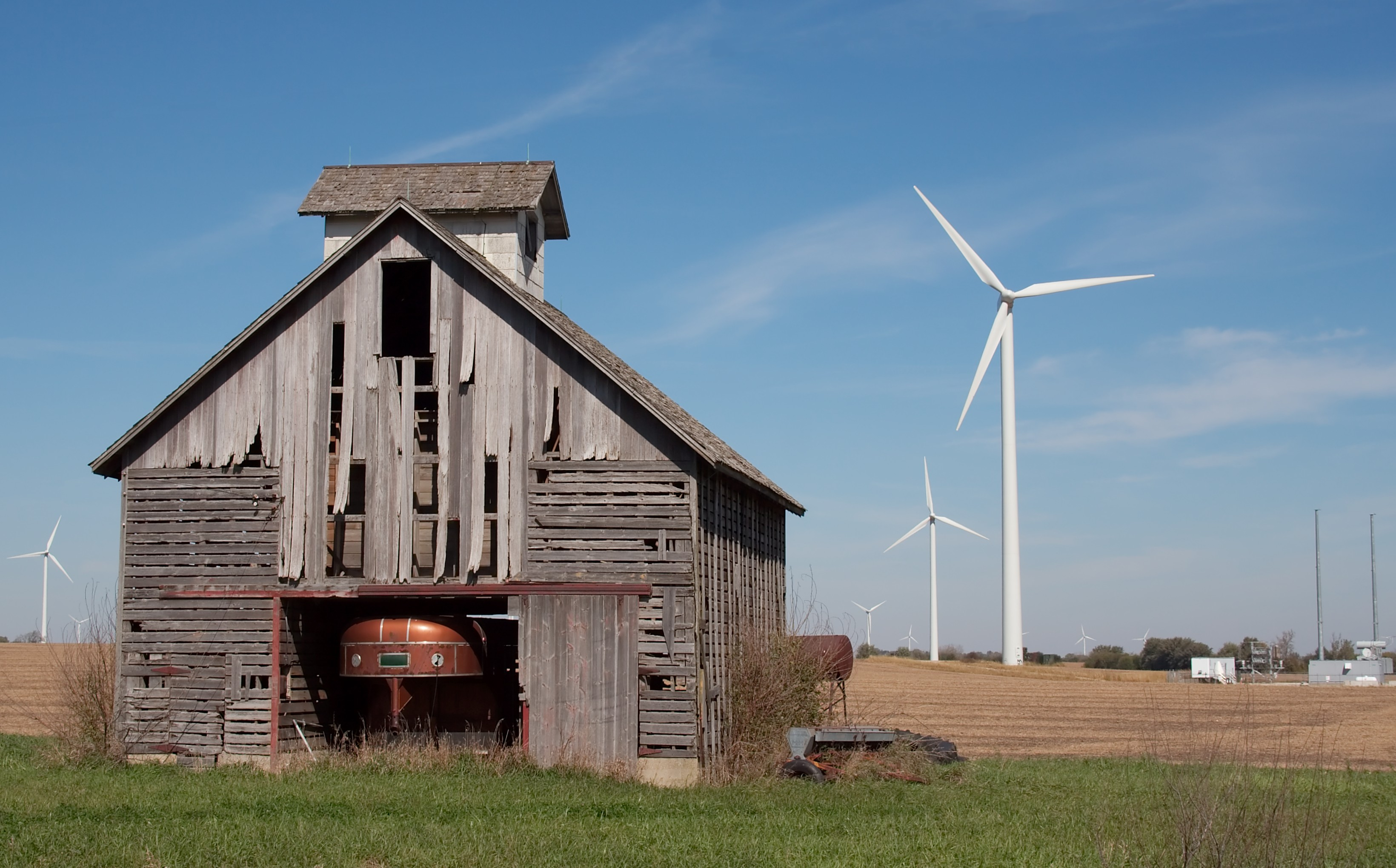
Mendota Hills Wind Farm in northern Illinois

Wind power in Illinois provided nearly 10% of the state's generated electrical power in 2020 powering 1,231,900 homes. At the end of 2020, Illinois had 6,300 megawatts (MW) of wind power installed, ranking fifth among states for installed wind turbine capacity. An additional 1,100 MW of wind power was under construction across the state at the end of 2020.

The vast majority of wind-generated electricity in Illinois is distributed via Midcontinent Independent System Operator, which services Illinois outside of northern Illinois—as opposed to PJM Interconnection, which distributes electricity in the Chicago metropolitan area.

== Overview ==
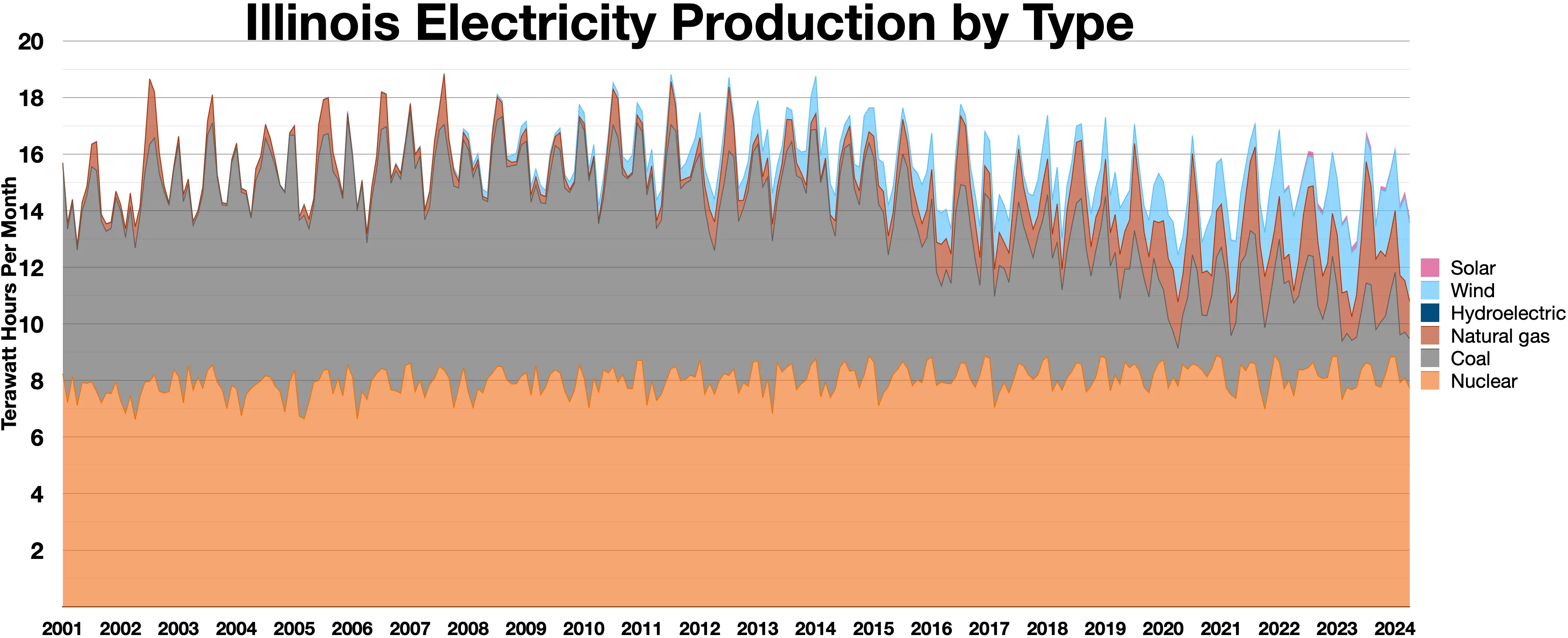
Illinois electricity production by type

Wind power has been supported by a renewable portfolio standard, passed in 2007, and strengthened in 2009, which requires 10% renewable energy from electric companies by 2010 and 25% by 2025. For 2013, in-state renewable generation was just 5.1% of Illinois' total generation. Additional renewably generated electricity is imported from other states. Illinois uses a large amount of electricity, and the state's mandate was enacted when only a very small percentage of its electricity was renewably generated.

Illinois has the potential for installing up to an estimated 249,882 MW of wind generation capacity at a hub height of 80 meters operating at 30% gross capacity factor. That amount is lower with higher capacity factors, and is higher with 100 meter hub heights.

The first wind farm in Illinois opened in 2003 and by 2009, it had over 1800 MW installed statewide with thousands of MW more in the planning stages. The largest wind farm in the state is the 300 MW Cayuga Ridge installation, while another seven windfarms each exceeded MW capacity. The Twin Groves Wind Farm was the largest wind farm east of the Mississippi when completed but has since been surpassed. Some smaller installations include a 0.66 MW turbine at the Bureau Valley School District and a 2.5 MW turbine at the Illinois Sustainable Technology Center, formerly part of the Illinois Department of Natural Resources, now part of the University of Illinois. A proposed high voltage DC transmission line would transmit wind generated electrical power to the Chicago area from northwest Iowa.

Power from some wind farms in Illinois is sold to the Tennessee Valley Authority. A 2010 agreement with Iberdrola Renewables provides a potential 300MW future supply from the Streator Cayuga Ridge Wind Farm in Livingston County.

== Wind farms ==
Illinois has among the highest densities of wind power of U.S. states.

Electricity generation sources in Illinois

Farm	Year	Installed capacity (MW)	County	Note
Mendota Hills	2003/2019	51.66/76	Lee	Turbines replaced in 2019
Crescent Ridge	2005	54.45	Bureau	
Pike County	2005	1.65	Pike	
GSG	2007	80	Lee/LaSalle	
Camp Grove	2007	150	Marshall/Stark	
Twin Groves I-II	2007-2008	396	McLean	
AgriWind	2008	8.4	Bureau	
Grand Ridge I-IV	2008-2009	210	LaSalle	
Providence Heights	2008	72	Bureau	
EcoGrove	2009	100.5	Stephenson	
Rail Splitter	2009	100.5	Logan/Tazewell	
Lee-DeKalb	2009	217.5	Lee/DeKalb	
Cayuga Ridge	2009	300	Livingston	
Geneseo	2009	3	Henry	
Top Crop I-II	2009-2010	300	LaSalle	
Streator Cayuga Ridge	2010	150	Livingston	
Walnut Ridge	2010	212	Bureau	
White Oak	2011	150	McLean	
Big Sky Wind	2011	239.4	Bureau/Lee	
Pioneer Trail	2011	150	Iroquois/Ford	
Settlers Trail	2011	150	Iroquois	
Shady Oaks	2012	109.5	Lee	
Bishop Hill	2012	200	Henry	
Minonk	2012	200	Woodford/Livingston	
California Ridge	2012	217.1	Vermilion/Champaign	
Bishop Hill I-II	2012	81	Henry	
Heartland Community College	2012	1.65	McLean	
Pilot Hill	2014	175	Iroquois/Kankakee	
Brown County	2014	1.5	Brown	
Hoopeston	2015	98	Vermilion	
Kelly Creek	2016	184	Kankakee/Ford	
Radford Run	2017	306	Macon	
Bishop Hill III	2018	132	Henry	
HillTopper	2018	185	Logan	
Whitney Hill	2019	66	Logan	
Bright Stalk	2019	205	McLean	
Green River	2019	194	Lee/Whiteside	
Cardinal Point	2020	150	McDonough/Warren	
Harvest Ridge	2020	200	Douglas	
Otter Creek	2020	158	LaSalle	
Broadlands	2020	200	Champaign	
Sugar Creek	2020	202	Logan	
Blooming Grove	2020	261	McLean	
Lone Tree	2020	88	Bureau	
Lincoln Land	2021	302	Morgan	
Glacier Sands	2021	185	Mason	
Bennington	2021	93	Marshall	
Ford Ridge	2022	120.4	Ford	
Sapphire Sky	2023	253.8	McLean	

== Wind generation ==
Illinois wind generation (GWh, million kWh)
Year	Jan	Feb	Mar	Apr	May	Jun	Jul	Aug	Sep	Oct	Nov	Dec	Total	% of production
2003	2	1	1	1	1	1	2	2	1	1	1	2	16	
2004	0	3	8	10	9	5	3	4	5	9	9	13	78	
2005	6	7	10	10	9	5	3	2	5	7	12	65	141	
2006	19	18	23	29	21	14	13	10	15	28	28	36	254	
2007	28	21	28	51	64	40	26	26	66	106	95	112	663	
2008	240	189	201	226	208	160	82	69	93	229	298	342	2,337	
2009	252	302	264	306	204	148	97	147	101	259	329	411	2,820	
2010	357	242	402	503	392	218	205	196	373	524	609	432	4,453	
2011	407	598	567	723	538	423	239	224	402	512	908	672	6,213	
2012	880	613	869	782	641	565	320	277	443	771	608	958	7,727	
2013	1,185	880	999	1,077	766	594	413	323	511	739	1,209	929	9,625	
2014	1,313	849	1,069	1,097	873	621	498	351	458	842	1,285	829	10,085	4.98%
2015	1,004	936	1,000	1,073	890	518	400	444	628	1,167	1,372	1,316	10,748	5.54%
2016	1,268	1,144	1,096	1,026	854	591	400	331	693	960	1,095	1,205	10,663	5.69%
2017	1,125	1,264	1,304	1,289	1,086	941	471	408	519	1,166	1,245	1,450	12,268	6.68%
2018	1,531	1,198	1,284	1,096	859	616	566	571	679	1,172	1,065	1,262	11,899	6.33%
2019	1,471	1,308	1,491	1,623	1,134	1,034	673	562	900	1,293	1,242	1,729	14,460	7.24%
2020	1,364	1,535	1,672	1,657	1,336	1,054	621	543	1,070	1,542	2,159	1,673	16,226	8.56%
2021	1,537	1,643	2,113	1,770	1,553	1,146	807	895	1,388	1,514	2,064	2,257	19,133	9.37%
2022	2,262	2,277	2,325	2,503	2,141	1,407	1,149	1,041	1,271	2,052	2,498	2,137	23,063	12.16%
2023	1,939	2,381	2,558	2,266	1,690	1,307	863	1,175	1,173	2,156	2,302	2,243	22,054	12.40%
2024	2,168	2,365											4,533	14.62%

Teal background indicates the largest wind generation month for the year.

Green background indicates the largest wind generation month to date.

Illinois wind generation in 2019
Net generation for wind, monthly

Illinois wind generation in 2020
Net generation for wind, monthly

Illinois wind generation capacity by year
Megawatts of installed generating capacity

== See also ==
- Solar power in Illinois
- Rock Island Clean Line
- Great Lakes offshore wind power
- Renewable energy in the United States
