= List of power stations in Illinois =

Sources of Illinois utility-scale electricity generation in gigawatt-hours, full-year 2025:
1. Nuclear: 97,670 (50.5%)
2. Natural gas: 32,567 (16.8%)
3. Coal: 30,895 (16.0%)
4. Wind: 25,011 (12.9%)
5. Solar: 6,494 (3.36%)
6. Biomass: 252 (0.13%)
7. Petroleum & other gases: 216 (0.11%)
8. Hydroelectric: 89 (0.05%)
9. Other: 214 (0.11%)

This is a list of electricity-generating power stations in the U.S. state of Illinois, sorted by type and name. In 2024, Illinois had a total summer capacity of 46.3 GW and a net generation of 185,013 GWh through all of its power plants. In 2025, the electrical energy generation mix was approximately 50.5% nuclear, 16.8% natural gas, 16% coal, 12.9% wind, 3.4% solar, and less than 1% combined from biomass, petroleum & other gases, hydroelectric, and other. Small-scale solar, which includes customer-owned photovoltaic panels, delivered an additional net 2,256 GWh of energy to the state's electrical grid in 2025.

As of 2024, Illinois generates more energy from its six nuclear power stations than any other U.S. state. Legislation in 2016 and 2021 provided state financial incentives which delayed the closure of several plants.

GridInfo maintains a directory of power plants in Illinois using data from the U.S. Energy Information Administration.

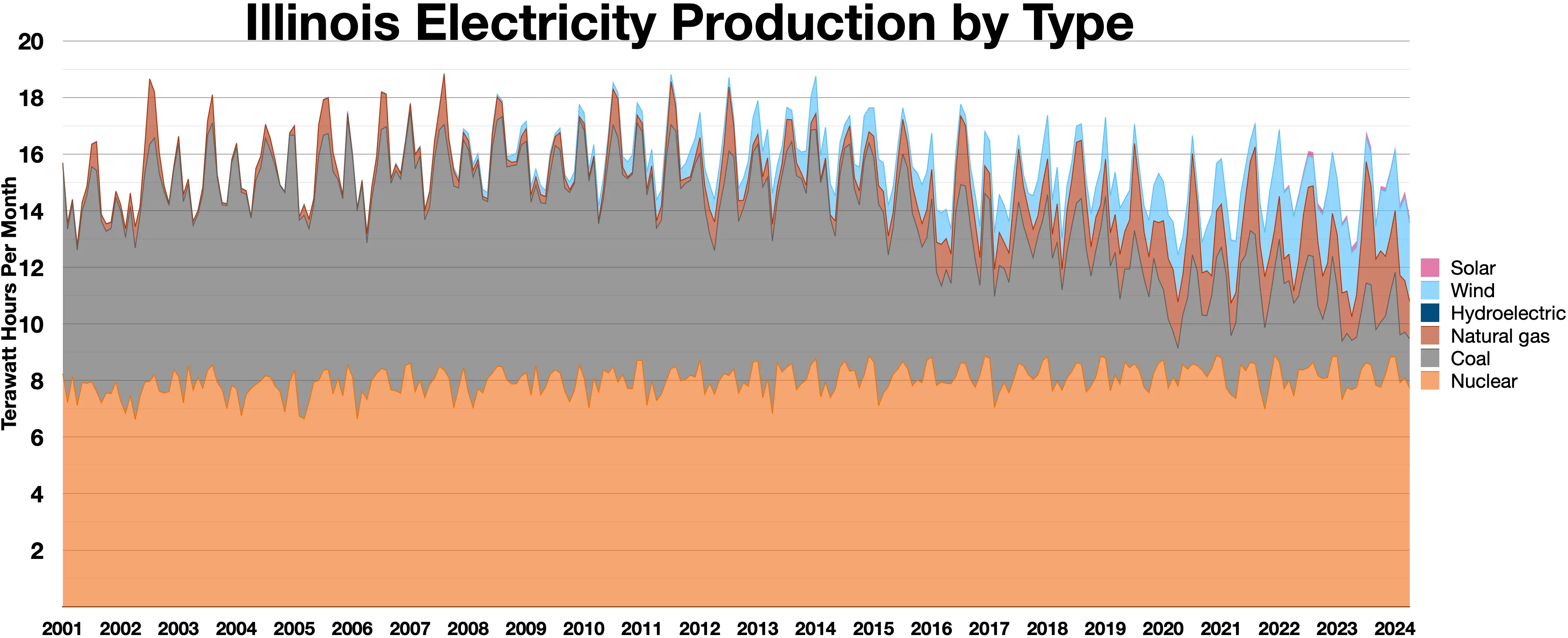
Illinois electricity production by type

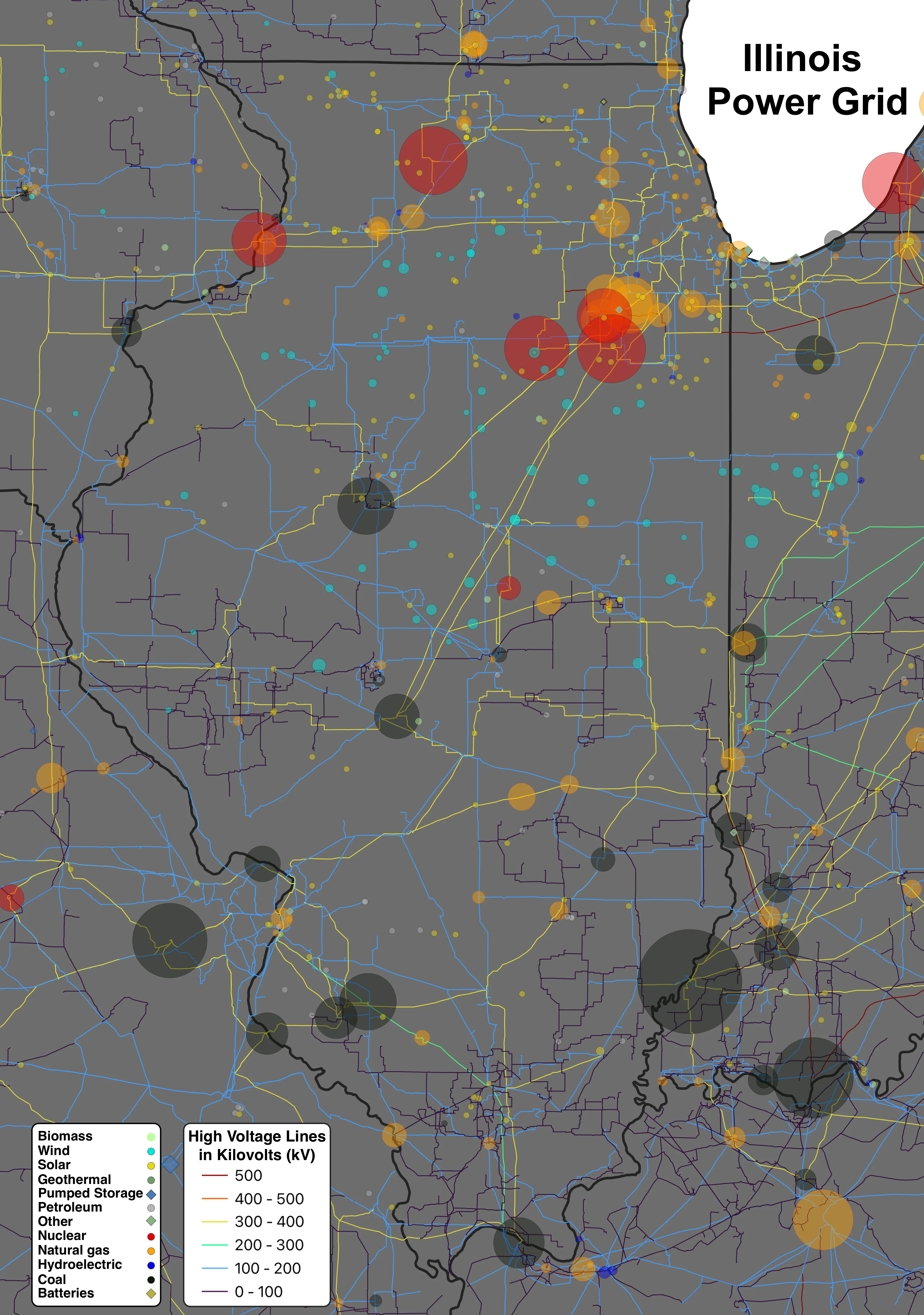
Illinois power grid

== Nuclear plants ==
Name	Location	Coordinates	Nameplate capacity (MW)	Generating units	2016 net generation (MWh)	Reactor type	Owner	License start	License expiration
Braidwood Nuclear Generating Station	Braidwood, Will County	41.244°N 88.229°W	2,389	2	19,849,269	Pressurized water	Constellation Energy	1987; 1988	2046 (Unit 1); 2047 (Unit 2)
Byron Nuclear Generating Station	Ogle County	42.074°N 89.282°W	2,347	2	19,600,248	Pressurized water	Constellation Energy	1985; 1987	2044 (Unit 1); 2046 (Unit 2)
Clinton Nuclear Generating Station	Clinton, De Witt County	40.172°N 88.835°W	1,069	1	8,914,453	Boiling water	Constellation Energy	1987	2047 (Unit 1)
Dresden Generating Station	Morris, Grundy County	41.389°N 88.269°W	1,845	2	15,443,893	Boiling water	Constellation Energy	1969; 1971	2029 (Unit 2); 2031 (Unit 3)
LaSalle County Nuclear Generating Station	LaSalle County	41.245°N 88.669°W	2,320	2	19,144,080	Boiling water	Constellation Energy	1982; 1983	2042 (Unit 1); 2043 (Unit 2)
Quad Cities Nuclear Generating Station	Cordova	41.726°N 90.310°W	1,871	2	15,655,095	Boiling water	Constellation Energy	1972; 1972	2032 (Unit 1); 2032 (Unit 2)

== Fossil-fuel plants ==
=== Coal ===
Name	Location	Coordinates	Nameplate capacity (MW)	Generating units	2016 net generation (MWh)	2016 GHG emissions (metric tons)	Owner	Opened	Status
Baldwin Generating Center	Baldwin	38.204°N 89.855°W	1,806	2^{[A]}	9,779,274	9,784,003	Vistra		Retiring by end of 2027, after an extension from the previously announced shutdown date of 12/31/25.
Kincaid Generating Station	Christian County	39°35.44′N 89°29.78′W	1,108	2	4,280,475	4,583,762	Vistra	1996	Retiring by end of 2027
Dallman Power Plant	Springfield	39.7551239°N 89.6019277°W	724	4			City Water, Light & Power	1968, 1972, 1978, 2009	Three oldest units are retired.
Newton Power Plant	Jasper County	38.937°N 88.276°W	1,151	1^{[B]}	3,320,361	3,446,397	Vistra		Retiring by end of 2027
Powerton Station	Pekin	40.541°N 89.680°W	1,538	1	4,541,832	5,289,941	NRG Energy	1972, 1975	Retiring by end of 2028
Prairie State Energy Campus	Marissa	38°16′40″N 89°40′4″W	1,600	2	10,587,579	10,488,120	Prairie State Energy Campus	2012	
SIPC – Lake of Egypt	Marion	37.625°N 88.937°W	272	2			Southern Illinois Power Cooperative	1963, 1978	Larger of 2 units closed in the fall of 2020.

^{A} Unit 1 and Unit 2 remain operational, as Unit 3 has been shuttered since 2019.
^{B} Unit 1 remains operational, as Unit 2 has been shuttered since 2016.

=== Natural gas ===
Plant	Location	Coordinates	Nameplate capacity (MW)	Generating units (type)	2016 net generation (MWh)	2016 GHG emissions (metric tons)	Operator	Opened
Cordova Energy Gas Plant	Cordova	41.713°N 90.280°W	690	1 (2x1 combined cycle)	45,910		Cordova Energy Co LLC	2001
Elgin Energy Center	Elgin	42.000°N 88.244°W	540	4 (simple cycle)	231,282		Rockland Capital	2002
Elwood Energy Center	Elwood	41.4388°N 88.1236°W	1,350	9 (simple cycle)			J-Power (EPDC)	1999; 2001
Gibson City Power Plant	Gibson City	40.470°N 88.398°W	228	2 (simple cycle)	113,401	75,005	Rockland Capital	2000
Grand Tower Power Station	Grand Tower, Jackson County	37.658°N 89.511°W	523	2 (1x1 combined cycle)	413,769	195,267	Rockland Capital	1950s 2001
Caterpillar Cogen	Mossville, Peoria County, Illinois	40.8430°N 89.5641°W	45	3; 12.2 MW Titan 130 combustion engines and 2 8.8 MW steam turbines			Caterpillar and Ameren	2000 present
Goose Creek Energy Center	Piatt County	40.106°N 88.599°W	432	6 (simple cycle)	27,657	19,977	Ameren Illinois	2003
Holland Energy	Beecher City	39.224°N 88.760°W	630	1 (2x1 combined cycle)		567,913	Hoosier Energy and Wabash Valley	2002
Kendall County Generation Facility	Minooka	41.480°N 88.256°W	1,256	4 (1x1 combined cycle)	6,605,374 (2019 data)	2,938,985	Dynegy	2002
Lee Energy Facility	Dixon	41.8287°N 89.4054°W	667	8 (simple cycle)			Duke Energy	2001
Lincoln Generating Facility	Manhattan	41.3933°N 87.9436°W	624	8 (simple cycle)			Tenaska	2000
Morris Cogeneration	Grundy County	41.4119°N 88.3328°W	212	1 (3x1 combined cycle)			Morris Cogen LLC	2000
NRG Rockford Energy Center	Rockford	42.2384°N 89.1011°W	466	3 (simple cycle)			NRG Energy	2000; 2002
Nelson Energy Center	Nelson	41.7744°N 89.6072°W	627	2 (1x1 combined cycle)			Invenergy	2015
Rocky Road	East Dundee	42.093°N 88.239°W	364	4 (simple cycle)	75,128		Dynegy	1999
Three Rivers Energy Center	Goose Lake Township						Competitive Power Ventures	2023
University Park North	University Park	41.4425°N 87.7514°W	540	12 (simple cycle)			LS Power	2002
University Park South	University Park	41.4409°N 87.7532°W	250	5 (simple cycle)			University Park Energy LLC	2001
Venice	Venice	38.6642°N 90.1764°W	487	4 (simple cycle)			Union Electric Company	2002/ 2005
Zion Energy Center	Zion	42.4776°N 87.8950°W	456	3 (simple cycle)			Calpine	2002

== Renewable plants ==
Data from the U.S. Energy Information Administration serves as a general reference.

=== Wind ===
Name	Location	Nameplate capacity (MW)	Turbines	2016 net generation (MWh)	Operator	Opened
AgriWind Project	Tiskilwa	8.4	4	5,891	Agriwind Holdings, LLC	2008
Mendota Hills Wind Farm	Paw Paw	76	29	82,357	Leeward Renewable Energy	2003, repowered 2019
Shady Oaks	Compton	110	71	323,948	Liberty Power	2012
Bishop Hill I	Henry County	211	98	601,090	Invenergy	2012
Bishop Hill II	Henry County	81	50	282,278	Invenergy	2012
Bishop Hill III	Henry County	132	53		Invenergy	2018
Brown County Wind Turbine	Brown County	1.5	1	2,983	Adams Electric Cooperative	2014
Minonk Wind Farm	Minonk	200	100	636,089	Liberty Power	2012
Crescent Ridge Wind Farm	Bureau County	54	33	146,775	Leeward Renewable Energy	2005
GSG Wind Farm	Compton	80	40	198,797	Infigen Energy	2007
Camp Grove Wind Farm	Camp Grove	150	100	405,676	Orion Renewables	2007
California Ridge	Champaign County, Vermilion County	217	134	732,885	Invenergy	2012
Twin Groves Wind Farm	McLean County	198	120		EDP Renewables North America	2007
Twin Groves Wind Farm II	McLean County	198	120		EDP Renewables North America	2007
Geneseo	Geneseo	3	2	6,574	City of Geneseo	2009
Grand Ridge Wind Farm I-IV	Marseilles	210	140	732,885	Invenergy	2009
Pilot Hill	Kankakee County, Iroquois County	175	101	573,434	EDF Energy	2015
Kelly Creek	Kankakee County, Ford County	184	92	82,646	EDF Energy	2016
Providence Heights Wind Farm	Bureau County	72	36	169,679	Iberdrola Renewables	2008
EcoGrove Wind Farm	Stephenson County	100	67	250,936	Acciona	2009
Heartland Community College	Normal	1.65	1	4,741	Heartland Community College	2012
Pike County Wind Power	Pike County	1.65	1	3,216	Illinois Rural Electric Cooperative	2005
Rail Splitter Wind Farm	Logan County, Tazewell County	100	67	280,646	EDP Renewables North America	2009
Lee-Dekalb Wind Energy Center	Lee County, DeKalb County	217	145		NextEra Energy Resources	2009
Radford's Run Wind Farm	Macon County	306	139		E.ON	2018
Streator Cayuga Ridge South Wind Farm	Livingston County	300	150	752,101	Iberdrola Renewables	2010
Top Crop I	Grundy County, LaSalle County	102	68	263,021	EDP Renewables North America	2009
Top Crop II	Grundy County, LaSalle County	198	132	489,941	EDP Renewables North America	2009
White Oak Wind Farm	McLean County	150	100	423,580	NextEra Energy Resources	2011
Big Sky Wind Farm	Bureau County, Lee County	240	114	522,333	EverPower	2011
Green River	Whiteside County, Lee County	194	74		Geronimo Energy	2019
Pioneer Trail Wind Farm	Ford County, Iroquois County	150	94	429,410	E.ON	2011
Settlers Trail Wind Farm	Iroquois County	150	94	380,904	E.ON	2013
Walnut Ridge	Bureau County	212	106		Berkshire Hathaway Energy	2018
HillTopper Wind Farm	Logan County	185	74		Enel	2018
Bright Stalk Wind Farm	McLean County	205	57		EDP Renewables North America	2019
Harvest Ridge Wind Farm	Douglas County	200	48		EDP Renewables North America	2020
Cardinal Point Wind	McDonough County, Warren County	150	60		Capital Power Corporation	2020
Otter Creek	Lasalle	158.2	4		AVANGRID	2020
Lone Tree	Bureau	88.1	29		Leeward Renewable Energy	2020
Blooming Grove	McLean	260.92	8		WEC Energy Group, Invenergy	2020
Lincoln Land	Morgan	301.74	107		Orsted Wind Power North America LLC	2021
Glacier Sands	Mason	184.9	43		Cordelio Power	2021
Bennington	Marshall	93.06	33		Stewardship Energy, Akuo Energy USA Inc.	2021
Ford Ridge	Ford	120.4	43		Orsted A/ S	2022
Sapphire Sky	McLean	253.8	64		Invenergy	2023

=== Solar photovoltaic ===
Name	Location	Type	Nameplate capacity (MW)	2016 net generation (MWh)	Acreage	Operator	Opened
Exelon City Solar	Pullman, Chicago	Crystalline silicon	9.0	14,102	41	Brookfield Renewable Partners	2010
Geneseo	Geneseo	Crystalline silicon	1.2	1,663	5	City of Geneseo	2015
Grand Ridge Solar Farm	LaSalle County	CIGS	20.0	29,350		Invenergy	2012
North Ninth Street	Rochelle	Crystalline silicon	0.312	396		Rochelle Municipal Utilities	2014
Rockford Solar Farm	Rockford	Crystalline silicon	2.6	3,299		Rockford Solar Partners	2012
2662 Freeport Solar 1	Stephenson County		2			Summit Ridge Energy LLC	2020
42nd Road Solar Project	Lasalle County		2			Summit Ridge Energy LLC	2022
Albertsons at Melrose Park	Cook County		1.9			Brookfield	2021
Amazon MDW6 Solar Project	Will County		1.9				2020
Amazon Solar Farm Illinois - Junction	Lee County		100			Amazon	2022
Ameresco Danville Solar Project	Vermilion County		2			Greenbacker Renewable Energy Company	2021
Apple Canyon Lake Solar	Jo Daviess County		1.2			Bluestem Energy Solutions	2020
Belleville Solar	St. Clair County		9.9			Republic Services, Inc., AES Clean Energy	2021
Big River	White County		149			Unknown	2022
Blue Goose Solar	Whiteside County		2			Summit Ridge Energy LLC	2020
Brownfield Solar Farm (DePue)	DePue, Putnam		20			AMERESCO	2023
Brush Creek I Solar	Stephenson County		2			TotalEnergies, Global Infrastructure Management Participation, LLC	2022
Cattail CSG	Whiteside County		2			Cypress Creek Renewables	2022
CED Champaign Solar LLC	Champaign County		1.6			Consolidated Edison Development Inc.	2020
CED Hilltop Solar	Winnebago County		2			Consolidated Edison Development Inc.	2021
Charter Durabar Solar	McHenry County		2			Constellation	2021
Clendenin A Community Solar Project	Williamson County		2			Summit Ridge Energy LLC	2021
Clinton Solar 4 LLC CSG	Clinton County		2			Summit Ridge Energy LLC	2020
Conagra Foods at St. Elmo	Fayette County		1.8				2021
Cortland	Dekalb County		2			Tenaska, Basalt Infrastructure Partners LLP, U.S. Bancorp	2021
Dodds Solar	Stephenson County		2			TotalEnergies, Global Infrastructure Management Participation, LLC	2021
Dressor Plains	Fayette County		99			Unknown, D.E. Shaw Renewable Investments (DESRI)	2021
Edwardsville Solar II	Madison County		2			Nexamp, Inc.	2021
Elba Solar Project	Williamson County		2			Sunvest Solar	2023
ESIL-PFCHICAGO 2	Cook County		1			Madison Energy Investments LLC	2020
ESIL-PFCHICAGO 3, LLC	Cook County		1.4			Lineage Logistics, LLC	2020
Fox Metro Solar Farm	Kendall County		2.6				2021
French Road CSG	Kane County		2			Nexamp, Inc.	2022
Gala Community Solar	Stephenson County		2			Clearway Renew LLC	2021
Galesburg Solar Array	Henderson County		1.4			AEP Energy	2020
Gar Creek CSG	Kankakee County		3.5			Babcock & Wilcox	2022
Griggs Solar	Kankakee County		2			Summit Ridge Energy LLC	2020
Harmony Road Solar	McHenry County		1.9			Mitsui & Co. (USA) Inc.	2020
Hurricane Creek Solar Project	Williamson County		2			Clearway Renew LLC	2021
IGS East Central Solar	Will County		2			Summit Ridge Energy LLC	2020
IGS Frankfort 2 Solar	Cook County		2			Summit Ridge Energy LLC	2021
IGS Stockton DG Solar	Jo Daviess County		3.7			Summit Ridge Energy LLC	2020
IKEA Joliet Rooftop PV System	Will County		2			IKEA	2017
Illinois PV Fulton 1 CSG	Peoria County		2			Summit Ridge Energy LLC	2020
IMEA - Rock Falls Solar	Whiteside County		1			Capital Dynamics	2020
JM Huber at Quincy Solar	Adams County		1.5			Brookfield Renewable Partners	2021
John A Logan College Solar	Williamson County		1.9			StraightUp Solar	2019
Kankakee Solar 4	Kankakee County		2			Summit Ridge Energy LLC	2020
Keeversville Solar CSG	Will County		2			Summit Ridge Energy LLC	2021
Kent School Road Solar 1	Stephenson County		2			Summit Ridge Energy LLC	2020
Kern A Community Solar	Franklin County		2			Summit Ridge Energy LLC	2021
Kish Solar	Boone County		2			Global Infrastructure Management Participation, LLC	2021
Lafayette 2 Kankakee Solar Project	Kankakee County		2			Goldman Sachs Renewable Power LLC	2020
Lena	Stephenson County		2			Tenaska, Basalt Infrastructure Partners LLP, U.S. Bancorp	2021
Lena Solar	Stephenson County		2				2020
Lineage Logistics Solar	Will County		1.6			NextEra Energy Resources	2019
Long John CSG	Dekalb County		2			Unknown	2021
Lukuc B Community Solar	Williamson County		2			Summit Ridge Energy LLC	2021
Marlow Solar	Jefferson County		2			Summit Ridge Energy LLC	2020
McDonough Solar 1	McDonough County		4			Summit Ridge Energy LLC	2020
McHenry Franks 1 Solar	McHenry County		2			Goldman Sachs Renewable Power LLC	2020
McHenry Franks 2 Solar	McHenry County		2			Goldman Sachs Renewable Power LLC	2020
Mendota US Solar 1	Lasalle County		2			U.S. Bancorp	2020
Mooseheart School Solar	Kane County		2			Mitsui & Co. (USA) Inc.	2020
Moraine Solar IL	McLean County		2			Clearway Renew LLC	2021
Morgan 1 Solar	Morgan County		2			Summit Ridge Energy LLC	2021
Morgan Solar 1b	Morgan County		2			Summit Ridge Energy LLC	2021
Morgan Solar 2	Morgan County		1.8			Summit Ridge Energy LLC	2020
Morgan Solar 4	Morgan County		2			Summit Ridge Energy LLC	2020
Mulligan	Logan County		70			Apex Clean Energy Inc.	2022
Northrop Grumman Solar	Rolling Meadows		1.1			NextEra Energy Resources	2020
Nostrand Solar	Kankakee County		2			Global Infrastructure Management Participation, LLC	2021
Olmstead II	Stephenson County		2			Cypress Creek Renewables	2021
Olney Solar II	Richland County		2			Nexamp, Inc.	2021
Peterman II Solar	Kankakee County		2			Cypress Creek Renewables	2021
Phoenix Solar South Farms LLC	Champaign County		4.7			RC Energy Group	2015
Pine Road Solar	Dekalb County		2			Summit Ridge Energy LLC	2021
Pontiac 1B Solar	Livingston County		2				2021
Pontiac CSG	Livingston County		2.7			Soltage, LLC	2022
Prairie State Solar Project	Perry County		99			Ranger Power, D.E. Shaw Renewable Investments (DESRI)	2021
Prairie Wolf	Coles County		200			National Grid	2021
Pretzel Solar Project	Stephenson County		2			Trajectory Energy Partners, LLC	2022
Prophet Solar Farm	Whiteside County		2			Cypress Creek Renewables	2021
Rantoul Solar	Champaign County		1			Altorfer Inc.	2016
Reed Road Solar	Kane County		1.3			Mitsui & Co. (USA) Inc.	2020
Ridge Farm Solar 1	Vermilion County		2			Tenaska	2020
Rockford Baxter Road Holdco Solar Project	Winnebago County		2				2021
Rockford Community Solar	Winnebago County		2.55			Nexamp, Inc.	2021
Rockford Community Solar	Winnebago County		2.6			Nexamp, Inc.	2021
Rockford CSG	Winnebago County		3			Unknown	2021
Route 76 Boone Solar 1	Boone County		2			Mitsubishi Corporation, Nexamp, Inc.	2020
Sandoval Holdco Solar	Clinton County		2			Tenaska	2020
Sauger 2 Solar (OE IL Solar 3)	Ogle County		2			Nexamp, Inc.	2022
Schulte Solar	Marshall County		2			Summit Ridge Energy LLC	2020
SCS American Bottoms 009885 Sauget Solar	St. Clair County		1.8			Capital Dynamics	2020
Segunda II Solar Facility	Lasalle County		2			Global Infrastructure Management Participation, LLC	2021
Slidematic at Rockford	Winnebago County		1.8			Brookfield	2022
Solar Farm 2.0	Urbana-Champaign		10		54	Sol Systems LLC, Capital Dynamics	2021
Somonauk Road Solar 1	Dekalb County		2			Mitsubishi Corporation, Nexamp, Inc.	2021
Square Barn Solar	McHenry County		1.5			Mitsui & Co. (USA) Inc.	2020
Sullivan B Community Solar Project	McDonough County		2			New Equity Energy	2020
SV CSG Gardner 1	Grundy County		2				2021
SV CSG Lily Lake 2	Kane County		2			Summit Ridge Energy LLC	2020
SV CSG Mt Morris 2	Ogle County		2			Summit Ridge Energy LLC	2021
The GSI at Assumption Solar Project	Christian County		1.5			Constellation	2021
Tower Road Solar	Dekalb County		2			Summit Ridge Energy LLC	2021
USS Goodrich Solar	Kankakee County		2			United States Solar Corporation	2022
USS Solar Brick Project	Macoupin County		2			United States Solar Corporation	2021
USS Sycamore Solar	Dekalb County		2.7			United States Solar Corporation	2022
Vermilion Solar 1	Vermilion County		2			Summit Ridge Energy LLC	2020
Viking Solar Project	Macoupin County		2			Clearway Renew LLC	2021
Vulcan Solar	Kankakee County		2			Global Infrastructure Management Participation, LLC	2021
Whiteside Solar 1	Whiteside County		2			Summit Ridge Energy LLC	2020
Wolfcastle	Dekalb County		2			Cypress Creek Renewables	2021
Woodlawn Solar Project	Will County		2			Clearway Renew LLC	2021

=== Hydroelectric ===
Plant	Location	Coordinates	Nameplate capacity (MW)	Generating units	2016 net generation (MWh)	Operator	Opened
Dayton Hydro	Dayton	41.3878°N 88.7897°W	3.6	3		Midwest Hydro	1925
Dixon Hydroelectric	Dixon	41.8453°N 89.4813°W	3.0	5		STS Hydropower	1925
Kankakee Hydro	Kankakee	41.1128°N 87.8681°W	1.2	3		City of Kankakee	1991
Lockport Powerhouse	Lockport	41.5697°N 88.0789°W	16.0	2		Chicago Metro Water Reclamation District	1999/2001
Moline	Moline	41.5100°N 90.5340°W	3.2	4		MidAmerican Energy	1942
Peru	Peru	41.3237°N 89.1123°W	6.8	4		City of Peru	1996
Rockton	Rockton	42.4511°N 89.0756°W	1.2	2		Midwest Hydro	1929
Sears Hydro	Rock Island	41.4614°N 90.5803°W	1.4	4		City of Rock Island	1985/2010
Upper Sterling	Rock Falls	41.7871°N 89.6775°W	2.0	2		City of Rock Falls	1988

=== Biomass ===
Plant	Location	Coordinates	Nameplate capacity (MW)	Generating units	2016 net generation (MWh)	Fuel type	Operator	Opened
Countryside Genco	Grayslake	42.3211°N 88.0319°W	12.8	4		Landfill gas		2012
Greene Valley Gas Recovery	Bolingbrook	41.7338°N 88.0849°W	6.0	2		Landfill gas	Waste Management RE	1996
Lake Gas Recovery	Northbrook	42.1062°N 87.8137°W	6.0	2		Landfill gas	Waste Management RE	1993
Livingston	Pontiac	40.9314°N 88.6548°W	15.0	3		Landfill gas	Hoosier Energy REC	1993
Orchard Hills	Rockford	42.3211°N 88.0319°W	16.2	6		Landfill gas	Hoosier Energy REC	2016
Settlers Hill Gas Recovery	Batavia	41.8719°N 88.2877°W	6.0	2		Landfill gas	Waste Management RE	1988

== Energy storage ==
Name	Location	Type	Nameplate capacity (MW)	2016 net generation (MWh)	Operator	Opened
Grand Ridge Energy Storage	Marseilles	Lithium iron phosphate battery	31.5	-5,076	Invenergy	2015
McHenry Storage Project	McHenry County	Lithium-ion battery	40	149,060	EDF Energy	2015
Elwood Energy Storage Center	West Chicago	Lithium iron phosphate battery	19.8	-3,964	Renewable Energy Systems	2015
Jake Energy Storage Center	Joliet	Lithium iron phosphate battery	19.8	-3,410	Renewable Energy Systems	2015

== Proposed power stations ==
Name	Location	Type	Nameplate capacity (MW)	Generating units	Operator	Status
	McLean County	Solar PV	6		Cypress Creek Renewables	Application submitted
	Marshall County	Solar PV	4		Trajectory Energy Partners	Application submitted
	Macomb	Solar PV	2		Sunrise Energy Ventures	Construction expected to begin within 18 months
	Yorkville	Solar PV	2		Turning Point Energy	Expected operable 2018 or 2019; stalled in 2023
Double Black Diamond Solar Farm	Sangamon, Morgan	Solar	800		Swift Current Energy	Under construction; expected operable in 2025
Osagrove Flats	La Salle County	Wind	153	34	Avangrid	Construction started 2024

== Closed/cancelled stations ==
Name	Location	Coordinates	Type	Nameplate capacity (MW)	Generating units	Owner	Links	Status
Collins Generating Station	Grundy County	41°21′05″N 88°21′16″W	Natural Gas, Bunker Oil	2500	5	Midwest Generation		Closed 2004
Coffeen Power Station	Montgomery County	39°03′33″N 89°24′11″W	Coal	900	2	Vistra		Closed November 1, 2019
Duck Creek Power Station	Canton	40.465°N 89.984°W	Coal	441	1	Vistra		Closed in 2019
E.D. Edwards Power Plant	Bartonville	40.5957°N 89.6628°W	Coal	560	1	Vistra		Closed in 2022
FutureGen	Morgan County	39°49′23″N 90°33′58″W	Coal	229				Cancelled in 2015
Havana	Havana	40.281°N 90.078°W	Coal	690	2	Vistra		Closed in 2019
Hennepin	Hennepin	41.303°N 89.315°W	Coal	301		Vistra		Closed in 2019
Hutsonville Power Station	Crawford County	39°8′2.4″N 87°39′36″W	Coal	151	2	Ameren		Closed in 2011
Joppa Steam Plant	Joppa	37.209°N 88.858°W	Coal, Natural Gas	948 (coal); 239 (natural gas)	8	Vistra		Closed in September 2022
Will County Station	Romeoville	41.633°N 88.062°W	Coal	510	3	NRG Energy		Closed in June 2022
Wood River	Alton	38.864°N 90.134°W	Coal/natural gas	594		Dynegy		Closed in 2016
Meredosia Power Station	Morgan County	39.823°N 90.567°W	Coal/petroleum	513	4	Ameren		Closed in 2011
Zion	Zion	42.4460578°N 87.8027112°W	Nuclear	2080	2	Exelon		Closed 1998

== See also ==
- List of power stations in the United States
