= Solar power in Illinois =

Overview of solar power in the U.S. state of Illinois

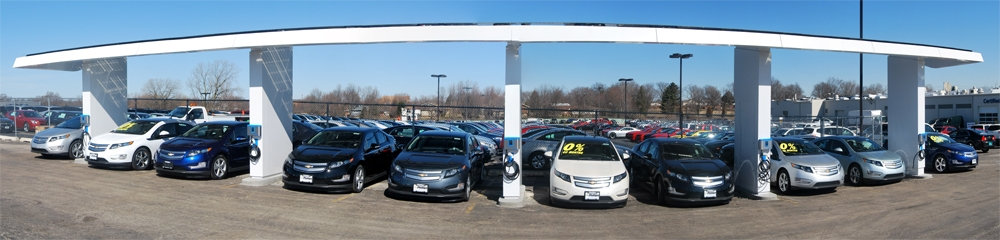
Solar electric car charging station in Frankfort, Illinois

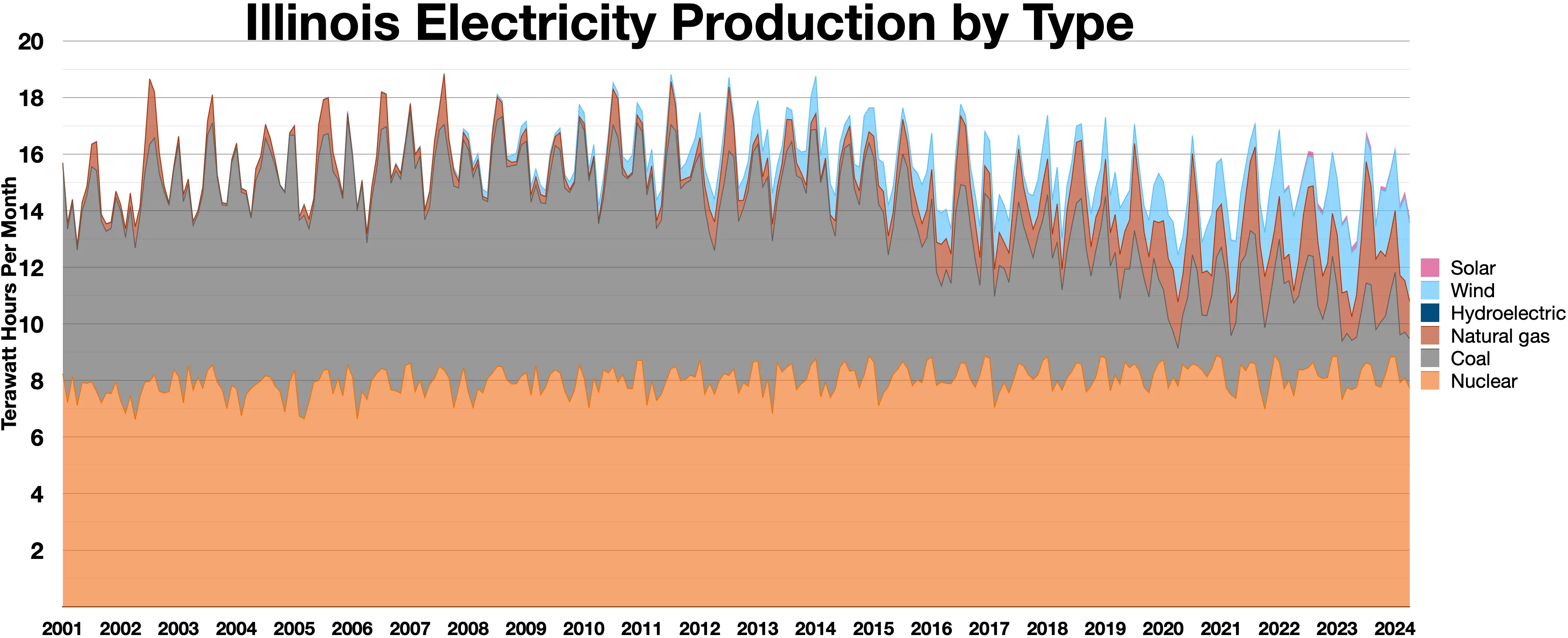
Illinois electricity production by type

Solar power in Illinois has been increasing, as the cost of photovoltaics has decreased. As of the end of 2020, Illinois had 465 megawatts (MW) of installed photovoltaic and concentrated solar power capacity combined employing over 5,200 jobs. Illinois introduced a community solar offering under the Illinois Shines program in 2019. As of 2024, Illinois was ranked fourth for its community solar operating capacity. Illinois adopted a net metering rule which allows customers generating up to 40 kW to use net metering, with the kilowatt hour surplus rolled over each month, and lost at the end of either April or October, as selected by the customer. In 2011, the limit was raised to 2 MW, but is not net metering, as the term is commonly known, as it uses two meters for systems larger than 40 kW.

As of 2022, Illinois ranks 17th nationally in cumulative installed solar capacity. There is enough solar energy installed in the state to power 217,000 homes.

== Currently operating (Note: As of December 31, 2025) ==
=== Chicagoland / Northeast Illinois region ===
Solar Facilities in Illinois (Chicagoland / Northeast Illinois)
#	Plant Name	Utility Name	County	Capacity (MW)	Operating Year
1	10601 Seymour Ave East 2 CSG	10601 Seymour Ave East, LLC	Cook	2.0	2025
2	10701 Seymour Ave East 1 CSG	10701 Seymour Ave East, LLC	Cook	2.9	2025
3	9521 US 14 SOLAR 1, LLC	Generate Capital	McHenry	2.0	2024
4	AES Griggs Solar, LLC	AES Griggs Solar, LLC	Kankakee	2.0	2020
5	Ahern Community Solar I, LLC	Ahern Community Solar I, LLC	Grundy	2.0	2023
6	Albertsons at Melrose Park	ESIL-AL-Melrose, LLC	Cook	1.9	2021
7	Alden Road Harvard Solar 1	Alden Road Harvard Solar 1, LLC	McHenry	2.0	2020
8	Amazon MDW6 Solar Project	Solar Star Prime 5, LLC	Will	1.9	2020
9	Amazon MDW7 Solar Project	Solar Star Prime 6, LLC	Will	1.9	2022
10	Armstrong 1	Greenbacker Renewable Energy Corporation	McHenry	2.0	2024
11	Beecher (IL)	Generate Capital	Will	5.0	2025
12	Bourbonnais	Solar DG IL 5, LLC	Kankakee	1.7	2024
13	Bystronic Manufacturing	Onyx Asset Services Group	Cook	1.3	2025
14	CED Beecher Sun Solar	Bay4 Energy Services, LLC	Will	2.0	2021
15	CED Spring Creek Solar	Bay4 Energy Services, LLC	Kankakee	2.0	2021
16	Cenergy IL - BA Family CSG	Standard Solar	Kankakee	5.0	2025
17	Cenergy IL - Zion CSG	Standard Solar	Lake	2.0	2025
18	Charter Durabar at Woodstock	Luminace Solar Illinois 2, LLC	McHenry	2.0	2021
19	Cottage Grove Ave Solar 1 LLC	SRC Partnership 12, LLC	Cook	2.0	2024
20	Cottage Grove North Solar 1, LLC	Generate Capital	Will	2.0	2024
21	Cottage Grove South Solar 1, LLC	Generate Capital	Will	2.0	2024
22	DS Containers	DS Containers LLC	DuPage	1.8	2025
23	Des Plaines 7-SLCHI819	Prologis Logistics Services Incorporated	Cook	1.4	2025
24	ESIL-PFCHICAGO 2, LLC	Madison Energy Holdings LLC	Cook	1.0	2020
25	ESIL-PFCHICAGO 3, LLC	Madison Energy Holdings LLC	Cook	1.4	2020
26	Exelon Solar Chicago	Luminace Solar Chicago, LLC	Cook	9.0	2009
27	FedEx Chicago Solar Facility	DG Illinois Solar, LLC	Cook	1.5	2020
28	Franklin Park 3-SLCHI803	Prologis Logistics Services Incorporated	Cook	1.2	2025
29	French Road Solar II	French Road Solar II, LLC	Kane	2.0	2022
30	GE-Hitachi Solar - Morris, IL	DG Illinois Solar, LLC	Grundy	0.9	2020
31	Goodenow Road West Solar 1, LLC	Generate Capital	Will	2.0	2024
32	Goodfarm Solar, LLC	SRC Partnership 12, LLC	Grundy	2.0	2024
33	Gooseberry Solar, LLC	Reactivate	Cook	2.0	2024
34	Gougar	Generate Capital	Will	2.0	2025
35	Grant	Generate Capital	McHenry	2.0	2025
36	Harmony Road Solar	Forefront Power, LLC	McHenry	1.9	2020
37	IGS East Central, LLC	SRC Partnership 3, LLC	Will	2.0	2020
38	IGS Frankfort 2 CSG	IGS Solar LLC	Cook	2.0	2021
39	IKEA Joliet Rooftop PV System	IKEA Property Inc	Will	2.0	2017
40	IL - ForeFront CS (Huntley)	IL Solar Huntley Project1, LLC	McHenry	2.9	2025
41	IL BEDFORD PARK 7035 W 65TH ST	Catalyze Bedford Park 7035 W 65th Street Microgrid, LLC	Cook	2.0	2025
42	IL Bedford Park 6901 W 65th St	Catalyze Bedford Park 6901 W 65th Street Microgrid, LLC	Cook	2.0	2025
43	IL Bolingbrook 279 Marquette Dr	Catalyze Bolingbrook 279 Marquette Drive Microgrid, LLC	Will	1.0	2025
44	IL Forefront - Degroot - St Anne	IL Solar St. Anne Project1, LLC	Kankakee	2.0	2025
45	IL Joliet 1101 Cherry Hl Rd	Catalyze Joliet 1101 Cherry Hill Road Microgrid, LLC	Will	4.0	2025
46	IL University Park 450 Central Ave	Catalyze University Park Central Ave Microgrid, LLC	Will	2.3	2025
47	ILSOLAR05 LLC	Dimension Energy LLC	Kane	5.0	2025
48	Irwin Solar, LLC	SRC Partnership 12, LLC	Kankakee	2.0	2024
49	Jeffery	Generate Capital	Kankakee	5.0	2025
50	KaneSolar03 LLC	Dimension Energy LLC	Kane	2.5	2025
51	Kankakee 2	Kankakee Solar 2 LLC	Kankakee	1.5	2022
52	Kankakee Solar 1	Pivot Energy	Kankakee	2.0	2024
53	Kankakee Solar 3	Pivot Energy	Kankakee	2.0	2024
54	Kankakee Solar 4 LLC	Kankakee Solar 4 LLC	Kankakee	2.0	2020
55	Kankakee Solar 5b	Pivot Energy	Kankakee	1.9	2025
56	Keeversville Solar CSG	Keeversville Solar Energy Center LLC	Will	2.0	2021
57	Lafayette 2 - Kankakee Yonke	MN8 Energy LLC	Kankakee	2.0	2020
58	Lafayette 2 - McHenry Franks 1	MN8 Energy LLC	McHenry	2.0	2020
59	Lafayette 2 - McHenry Franks 2	MN8 Energy LLC	McHenry	2.0	2020
60	Lawrence Solar 1 LLC	SunVest Solar LLC	McHenry	2.0	2024
61	Lawrence Solar 2 LLC	SunVest Solar LLC	McHenry	2.0	2024
62	Lilly Pond Road Solar 1, LLC	Generate Capital	McHenry	2.0	2025
63	Lineage Logistics Solar	DG Illinois Solar, LLC	Will	1.6	2019
64	Lobelia 1	Greenbacker Renewable Energy Corporation	McHenry	2.0	2024
65	Lowe's - 1845 - Chicago Brickyard, IL	North Narragansett Avenue Solar Project 2022, LLC	Cook	1.0	2025
66	Manteno Solar 1 LLC	SRC Partnership 12, LLC	Kankakee	2.0	2023
67	Marengo Solar	DG Illinois Solar, LLC	McHenry	2.0	2020
68	Monee Solar 1, LLC	Reactivate	Will	2.0	2024
69	Mooseheart School Solar	Forefront Power, LLC	Kane	2.0	2020
70	N Solon Road (North)	Greenbacker Renewable Energy Corporation	McHenry	2.0	2024
71	N Solon Road (South)	Greenbacker Renewable Energy Corporation	McHenry	2.0	2024
72	NL IL - 2000 North Road CSG	Standard Solar	Kankakee	5.0	2025
73	NL IL - 241 North CSG	Standard Solar	Will	5.0	2025
74	NL IL - Kendall	Newark Road Kendall Solar 1, LLC	Kendall	2.0	2024
75	North Cottage Grove Solar 1, LLC	Reactivate	Cook	2.0	2024
76	NorthropGrummanSolar(Rolling Meadows,IL)	DG Illinois Solar, LLC	Cook	1.1	2020
77	Nostrand	Nostrand Solar, LLC	Kankakee	2.0	2021
78	Peterman II	Peterman Solar II, LLC	Kankakee	2.0	2021
79	Reed Road Solar	Forefront Power, LLC	McHenry	1.3	2020
80	Richmond Solar	DG Richmond, LLC	McHenry	2.0	2025
81	Romeoville 34 - SLCHI234 - BSCHI234	Prologis Logistics Services Incorporated	Will	1.1	2025
82	S-Pulaski Solar	SoCore Energy LLC	Cook	2.0	2024
83	SCS Plainfield 011755 Naperville, LLC	Arevon Energy, Inc.	DuPage	1.0	2021
84	SV CSG Gardner 2 LLC	SRC Partnership 12, LLC	Grundy	2.0	2024
85	SV CSG Kensington 1 LLC	SRC Partnership 12, LLC	Kankakee	2.0	2024
86	SV CSG Lily Lake 2 LLC	SV CSG Lily Lake 2 LLC	Kane	2.0	2020
87	SV CSG Momence 1 LLC	SRC Partnership 12, LLC	Kankakee	2.0	2024
88	SV CSG Momence 2 LLC	SRC Partnership 12, LLC	Kankakee	2.0	2024
89	SV CSG Plato Solar 1 LLC	SunVest Solar LLC	Kane	4.3	2025
90	SV Gardner 1 (Lutz) CSG	SV CSG Gardner 1 LLC	Grundy	2.0	2021
91	Square Barn Solar	Forefront Power, LLC	McHenry	1.5	2020
92	Torrence Ave Solar 1 LLC	Reactivate	Cook	2.0	2024
93	Tully 1	Greenbacker Renewable Energy Corporation	Grundy	2.0	2025
94	USS Goodrich Solar	Standard Solar	Kankakee	2.0	2022
95	USS Lowe Solar	SRC Partnership 15 LLC	Kankakee	2.0	2024
96	USS St Anne Solar LLC (St Anne 2)	SRC Partnership 16, LLC	Kankakee	2.0	2024
97	USS St Anne Solar LLC (St. Anne 1)	SRC Partnership 16, LLC	Kankakee	2.0	2024
98	USS University Park Solar	United States Solar Corporation	Will	2.0	2025
99	Vulcan	Vulcan Solar, LLC	Kankakee	2.0	2021
100	Water Lily Solar LLC	Dimension Energy LLC	Kendall	2.6	2025
101	Woodlawn CSG	Woodlawn Solar, LLC	Will	2.0	2021
102	Woodlawn II (CSG)	Woodlawn Solar II, LLC	Will	2.0	2021
103	Yeoman Creek	BQ Energy Development	Lake	7.0	2025

=== East Central Illinois region ===
Solar Facilities in Illinois (East Central Illinois)
#	Plant Name	Utility Name	County	Capacity (MW)	Operating Year
1	Ameresco Danville Solar, LLC	Altus Power America Management, LLC	Vermilion	2.0	2021
2	Anacott	Generate Capital	Montgomery	5.0	2025
3	Beckham Solar LLC	Dimension Energy LLC	Livingston	5.0	2025
4	Beebalm Solar	Generate Capital	Livingston	5.0	2025
5	Breezewood	SunStrong Management, LLC	McLean	2.0	2024
6	CED Champaign Solar LLC	RWE Clean Energy	Champaign	1.6	2020
7	Champaign Solar, LLC	SRC Partnership 16, LLC	Champaign	3.5	2025
8	Coffeen Solar BESS	Vistra Corp	Montgomery	44.2	2024
9	Double Back Diamond	Double Back Diamond Solar Power, LLC	Sangamon	592.8	2024
10	Drummer Creek I Solar LLC	Dimension Energy LLC	Ford	5.0	2025
11	Edgar Solar 1	Pivot Energy	Edgar	4.0	2025
12	Emily Solar, LLC	RWE Clean Energy	Cumberland	273.6	2025
13	Heartland Community College	Heartland Community College	McLean	0.2	2024
14	IL Sidney Project1	IL Sidney Project1, LLC	Champaign	2.0	2021
15	IL-Forefront Ameren- Sidney 1	IL Solar Sidney Project1, LLC	Champaign	2.0	2025
16	Iroquois Solar 1B LLC CSG	Iroquois Solar 1B LLC	Iroquois	2.0	2020
17	Macon County IL S1	SolAmerica Energy, LLC	Macon	2.0	2025
18	Marshall Solar (IL)	Altorfer Inc.	Clark	1.0	2025
19	Medanos Solar LLC	Dimension Energy LLC	Champaign	5.0	2025
20	Moraine CSG	Moraine Solar, LLC	McLean	2.0	2021
21	Mulligan Solar, LLC	Mulligan Solar	Logan	70.0	2022
22	NE IL - Esmen West	Standard Solar	Livingston	5.0	2025
23	NL IL - 1875 North Road CSG	Standard Solar	Livingston	5.0	2025
24	NL IL - Piatt 1 - East CSG	Standard Solar	Piatt	2.0	2025
25	NL IL - Piatt 2 - West CSG	Standard Solar	Piatt	2.0	2025
26	Northern Cardinal Solar SCS IL 1, LLC	Arevon Energy, Inc.	Champaign	10.0	2021
27	Oreana Renewables	Oreana Renewables LLC	Macon	5.0	2025
28	Oreana Solar	Dimension Energy LLC	Macon	5.0	2025
29	Phoenix Solar South Farms LLC Solar Farm	Phoenix Solar South Farms LLC	Champaign	4.7	2015
30	Pontiac	Pontiac Solar, LLC	Livingston	2.0	2021
31	Pontiac 1A	Solar DG IL 3 LLC	Livingston	2.0	2024
32	Prairie Wolf Solar LLC	Geronimo Power	Coles	200.0	2021
33	Rantoul Solar	Altorfer Inc.	Champaign	2.0	2016
34	Ridge Farm	Ridge Farm Solar 1 LLC	Vermilion	2.0	2020
35	River Ferry Solar 1	River Ferry Solar 1, LLC	Clark	165.3	2023
36	SAE Paris IL S1	SolAmerica Energy, LLC	Edgar	2.0	2025
37	SAE Taylorville IL S1	SolAmerica Energy, LLC	Christian	1.1	2025
38	SCS COUNTY 012631 Champaign, LLC	Arevon Energy, Inc.	Champaign	2.0	2021
39	SCS West Fairchild 011958 Danville, LLC	Arevon Energy, Inc.	Vermilion	1.6	2021
40	Skyline	SunStrong Management, LLC	Christian	5.0	2024
41	Solar Star Urbana Landfill Central	Solar Star Urbana Landfill Central, LLC	Champaign	1.9	2021
42	Solar Star Urbana Landfill East	Solar Star Urbana Landfill East, LLC	Champaign	1.9	2021
43	TAC-Distributed Energy Resource Hybrid	Ameren Illinois	Champaign	0.1	2017
44	The GSI Group LLC at Assumption	Luminace Solar Illinois 2, LLC	Christian	1.5	2021
45	Towanda	Dimension Energy LLC	McLean	5.0	2025
46	Triple S Solar I LLC CSG	AES Clean Energy	Coles	2.0	2025
47	USS Man Solar LLC	United States Solar Corporation	Livingston	1.0	2025
48	USS Solar Brick	Standard Solar	Macoupin	2.0	2021
49	USS Vermilion Solar 1 LLC (Vermilion 1)	SRC Partnership 15 LLC	Vermilion	2.0	2024
50	USS Vermilion Solar 1 LLC (Vermilion 2)	SRC Partnership 15 LLC	Vermilion	2.0	2024
51	USS Young Solar LLC (Young 2)	SRC Partnership 16, LLC	Douglas	2.0	2025
52	Vermilion Solar 1, LLC CSG	Vermilion Solar 1, LLC	Vermilion	2.0	2020
53	Vermilion Solar I LLC CSG	AES Clean Energy	Livingston	1.9	2025
54	Vermilion Solar II LLC CSG	AES Clean Energy	Livingston	2.0	2025
55	Viking Solar CSG	Viking Solar, LLC	Macoupin	2.0	2021
56	Walldog	SunStrong Management, LLC	Livingston	5.0	2024

=== North Central Illinois region ===
Solar Facilities in Illinois (North Central Illinois)
#	Plant Name	Utility Name	County	Capacity (MW)	Operating Year
1	AES Bend Solar I, LLC CSG	AES Clean Energy	Winnebago	2.0	2025
2	AES Bend Solar II, LLC CSG	AES Clean Energy	Winnebago	1.9	2025
3	All World Solar Facility	All World Machinery Supply, Inc.	Winnebago	1.5	2023
4	Boigenzahn Solar 1A, LLC	SRC Partnership 12, LLC	DeKalb	2.0	2023
5	Briscoe 1A	7th Road Solar 1, LLC (Briscoe 1A)	LaSalle	2.0	2023
6	Briscoe 2A	7th Road Solar 2, LLC (Briscoe 2A)	LaSalle	2.0	2023
7	Briscoe Solar 1	SRC Partnership 14 LLC	LaSalle	2.0	2024
8	Briscoe Solar 2	SRC Partnership 14 LLC	LaSalle	2.0	2025
9	CED Hilltop Solar	Bay4 Energy Services, LLC	Winnebago	2.0	2021
10	CSG Mt. Morris 2, LLC	CSG Mt. Morris 2, LLC	Ogle	2.0	2021
11	Cortland	Cortland Solar 2 LLC	DeKalb	2.0	2021
12	Crawford 1 Solar	SRC Partnership 14 LLC	Lee	2.0	2024
13	Crawford 1A Solar	SRC Partnership 14 LLC	Lee	2.0	2025
14	DeKalb Taylor LLC	SunVest Solar LLC	DeKalb	4.9	2025
15	Engel Solar 1, LLC	SRC Partnership 12, LLC	DeKalb	2.0	2023
16	Engel Solar 1A	SRC Partnership 14 LLC	DeKalb	2.0	2024
17	Frieders Solar 1, LLC	SRC Partnership 12, LLC	DeKalb	2.0	2023
18	Grand Ridge Solar Farm	Invenergy Services LLC	LaSalle	20.0	2012
19	Heinsohn Solar 1, LLC	SRC Partnership 12, LLC	DeKalb	2.0	2024
20	Heinsohn Solar 1A, LLC	SRC Partnership 12, LLC	DeKalb	2.0	2024
21	Heinsohn Solar 2	SRC Partnership 14 LLC	DeKalb	2.0	2024
22	Heinsohn Solar 2A	SRC Partnership 14 LLC	DeKalb	2.0	2024
23	Hoppe Nitzberg Solar 1	SRC Partnership 14 LLC	DeKalb	2.0	2024
24	Hoppe Nitzberg Solar 1A	SRC Partnership 14 LLC	DeKalb	2.0	2024
25	IL - Ameresco - Belvidere East	Belvidere Landfill Solar 2 East, LLC	Boone	2.0	2025
26	IL - Ameresco - Belvidere West	Belvidere Landfill Solar 2 West, LLC	Boone	1.5	2025
27	IL - Forefront Windfree- Shabbona 2	IL Solar Shabbona Project2, LLC	DeKalb	1.3	2025
28	IL -ForeFront CS (Brimfield 1 2) - Brimf	IL Solar Brimfield Project 1, LLC	Boone	2.0	2025
29	IL Rochelle 975 S. Caron Rd	Catalyze Rochelle Wiscold Drive Microgrid, LLC	Ogle	1.5	2025
30	IL-Forefront ComED-Shabbona	IL Solar Shabbona Project1, LLC	DeKalb	2.0	2025
31	Kish CSG	Kish Solar, LLC	Boone	2.0	2021
32	LaSalle Solar 1	Pivot Energy	LaSalle	2.0	2025
33	LaSalle Solar 6	Pivot Energy	LaSalle	3.6	2025
34	Long John CSG	Long John Solar, LLC	DeKalb	2.0	2021
35	Machesney Park	Solar DG IL 1 LLC	Winnebago	1.7	2024
36	Mendota	Mendota US Solar 1 LLC	LaSalle	2.0	2020
37	Mendota Rich Dev CSG	42nd Road Solar LLC	LaSalle	2.0	2022
38	Moore Solar 1, LLC	SRC Partnership 12, LLC	DeKalb	2.0	2024
39	Moore Solar 1A, LLC	SRC Partnership 12, LLC	DeKalb	2.0	2024
40	Mt. Morris Solar CSG	DG Illinois Solar, LLC	Ogle	2.0	2020
41	NL IL - Maples Road	Standard Solar	Lee	5.0	2025
42	North Ninth Street	Rochelle Municipal Utilities - (IL)	Ogle	0.3	2014
43	OE IL Solar 3	OE IL Solar 3, LLC	Ogle	2.0	2022
44	Pine Road Solar, LLC CSG	Pine Road Solar, LLC	DeKalb	2.0	2021
45	Plote Somonauk	Solar DG IL 2, LLC	DeKalb	2.0	2024
46	Poplar Grove Solar 2, LLC	SRC Partnership 12, LLC	Boone	2.0	2023
47	Poplar Grove Solar, LLC	SRC Partnership 12, LLC	Boone	2.0	2023
48	Putnam Solar 1	Pivot Energy	Putnam	2.0	2024
49	Putnam Solar 1B	Pivot Energy	Putnam	2.0	2024
50	Rock Cut Solar	SRC Partnership 15 LLC	Winnebago	4.0	2025
51	Rockford CS 1	Rockford CS 1, LLC	Winnebago	2.0	2021
52	Rockford CS 2	Rockford CS 2, LLC	Winnebago	2.0	2021
53	Rockford CSG	Rockford Baxter Rd Holdco LLC CSG	Winnebago	2.0	2021
54	Rockford Plant	SoCore Energy LLC	Winnebago	2.0	2024
55	Rockford Solar	Rockford Solar, LLC	Winnebago	2.0	2021
56	Rockford Solar Farm	Rockford Solar Partners	Winnebago	2.6	2012
57	Route 76 Boone Solar 1	Route 76 Boone Solar 1, LLC	Boone	2.0	2020
58	SAE Ottawa IL	SolAmerica Energy, LLC	LaSalle	2.0	2025
59	SV CSG Garden Prairie 1, LLC	SRC Partnership 12, LLC	Boone	2.0	2024
60	SV CSG Garden Prairie 2, LLC	SRC Partnership 12, LLC	Boone	2.0	2024
61	SV CSG Kirkland 1 LLC	SRC Partnership 12, LLC	DeKalb	2.0	2024
62	SV CSG Kirkland 2 LLC	SRC Partnership 12, LLC	DeKalb	2.0	2024
63	SV CSG Mt Morris 3 LLC	SRC Partnership 12, LLC	Ogle	2.0	2024
64	SV CSG South Dekalb 1 LLC	SV CSG South Dekalb 1 LLC	DeKalb	2.0	2023
65	SV CSG South Dekalb 2 LLC	SV CSG South Dekalb 2 LLC	DeKalb	2023	
66	Segunda II (CSG)	Segunda Solar II, LLC	LaSalle	2.0	2021
67	Slidematic at Rockford	Luminace Solar Illinois 2, LLC	Winnebago	1.8	2022
68	Somonauk Road Solar 1	Somonauk Road Solar 1, LLC	DeKalb	2.0	2021
69	Tower Road Solar, LLC CSG	Tower Road Solar, LLC	DeKalb	2.0	2021
70	USS Ducks Solar CSG	USS Ducks Solar LLC	Ogle	5.0	2025
71	USS Sycamore Solar (CSG)	Standard Solar	DeKalb	2.0	2022
72	Whiskey Acres	Solar DG IL 4, LLC	DeKalb	2.0	2024
73	Wolfcastle	Wolfcastle Solar, LLC	DeKalb	2.0	2021

=== Northwest Illinois region ===
Solar Facilities in Illinois (Northwest Illinois)
#	Plant Name	Utility Name	County	Capacity (MW)	Operating Year
1	2662 Freeport Solar 1 CSG	2662 Freeport Solar 1, LLC	Stephenson	2.0	2020
2	Abel Solar	SoCore Energy LLC	Whiteside	2.0	2021
3	Agrimony 1	Greenbacker Renewable Energy Corporation	Jo Daviess	2.0	2025
4	Agrimony 2	Greenbacker Renewable Energy Corporation	Jo Daviess	2.0	2025
5	Apple Canyon Lake Solar	ACM Solar, LLC.	Jo Daviess	1.2	2020
6	Blue Goose Solar CSG	Blue Goose Solar	Whiteside	2.0	2020
7	Bunker Hill Solar	SoCore Energy LLC	Whiteside	2.0	2021
8	Bureau Solar 1	Pivot Energy	Bureau	5.0	2025
9	Cattail (CSG)	Cattail Solar, LLC	Whiteside	2.0	2022
10	Cedarville (IL)	Generate Capital	Stephenson	2.0	2024
11	Cedarville Road	SRC P9 - Lena Solar, LLC	Stephenson	2.0	2020
12	DG Harlem Solar	DG Harlem, LLC	Stephenson	2.0	2024
13	DPC York	SoCore Energy LLC	Carroll	1.5	2019
14	Dakota	SunStrong Management, LLC	Stephenson	5.0	2024
15	Dakota Solar 1, LLC	Generate Capital	Stephenson	2.0	2024
16	DePue Holdings, LLC	DePue Holdings, LLC	Bureau	20.0	2023
17	Dodds (CSG)	Dodds Solar, LLC	Stephenson	2.0	2021
18	Freeport 18th Solar	Generate Capital	Stephenson	2.0	2025
19	Gala (CSG)	Gala Solar, LLC	Stephenson	2.0	2021
20	Galt	SunStrong Management, LLC	Whiteside	5.0	2024
21	Galva Landfill	Navisun LLC	Henry	3.7	2025
22	Geneseo	City of Geneseo - (IL)	Henry	1.2	2015
23	Geranium Solar	Generate Capital	Bureau	5.0	2025
24	Goldenrod (IL)	Generate Capital	Mercer	5.0	2025
25	Harmony Solar Project	SoCore Energy LLC	Stephenson	2.0	2024
26	High Point Solar LLC	Acciona Energy USA Global, LLC	Stephenson	100.0	2023
27	IGS Stockton DG CSG	SRC Partnership 3, LLC	Jo Daviess	3.8	2020
28	IL-Forefront ComEd-Lena 1	IL Solar Lena Project1, LLC	Stephenson	2.0	2025
29	IL-Forefront ComEd-Lena 2	IL Solar Lena Project2, LLC	Stephenson	2.0	2025
30	IL17021 Brush Creek I CSG	SPG IL Brush Creek I Solar LLC	Stephenson	2.0	2022
31	Kent School Road Solar 1	Kent School Road Solar 1	Stephenson	2.0	2020
32	Lena	Lena Solar 1 LLC	Stephenson	2.0	2021
33	N Baker Road	Greenbacker Renewable Energy Corporation	Stephenson	2.0	2025
34	N Baker Road 2	Greenbacker Renewable Energy Corporation	Stephenson	2.0	2025
35	NL IL - McConnell Road	Standard Solar	Stephenson	5.0	2025
36	Ohio Solar LLC	Ohio Solar, LLC	Bureau	5.0	2025
37	Olmstead II CSG	Olmstead Solar II, LLC	Stephenson	2.0	2021
38	Pope Creek Solar PV	Pope Creek Solar, LLC	Mercer	5.0	2024
39	Pretzel CSG	Pretzel Solar, LLC	Stephenson	2.0	2022
40	Princeton Solar	Altorfer Inc.	Bureau	1.0	2025
41	Prophet CSG	Prophet Solar, LLC	Whiteside	2.0	2021
42	Rocky Mountain Elk Solar Community Solar	Rocky Mountain Elk Solar, LLC	Bureau	5.0	2025
43	Round Grove 1	SoCore Energy LLC	Whiteside	2.0	2021
44	Round Grove 2	SoCore Energy LLC	Whiteside	2.0	2021
45	SCS Beltway 011754 Rock Falls, LLC	Arevon Energy, Inc.	Whiteside	1.0	2020
46	SV CSG Baileyville 1 LLC	SV CSG Baileyville 1 LLC	Stephenson	2.0	2023
47	SV CSG Baileyville 2 LLC	SV CSG Baileyville 2 LLC	Stephenson	2.0	2023
48	SV CSG German Valley 1 LLC	SunVest Solar LLC	Stephenson	2.0	2025
49	Sawyer	Generate Capital	Whiteside	5.0	2025
50	Trinity Freeport	Generate Capital	Stephenson	2.0	2024
51	USS Cattail Solar	USS Cattail Solar LLC	Whiteside	2.3	2025
52	USS Origami Solar	USS Origami Solar LLC	Whiteside	4.3	2025
53	Unity Solar Project (IL)	SoCore Energy LLC	Stephenson	2.0	2024
54	Whiteside Solar 1 CSG	Whiteside Solar 1, LLC	Whiteside	2.0	2020
55	Yager	Generate Capital	Whiteside	2.0	2024
56	Yorktown 1 Solar	SoCore Energy LLC	Whiteside	2.0	2024
57	Yorktown 2 Solar	SoCore Energy LLC	Whiteside	2.0	2024

=== Southern Illinois region ===
Solar Facilities in Illinois (Southern Illinois)
#	Plant Name	Utility Name	County	Capacity (MW)	Operating Year
1	950th Sun 2	950th Sun 2 LLC	Crawford	2.3	2025
2	AES Belleville Solar LLC	AES Distributed Energy	St. Clair	9.9	2021
3	Baldwin Solar BESS	Vistra Corp	Randolph	68.4	2024
4	Big River Solar	Big River Solar, LLC	White	149.0	2022
5	Boomtown Renewable Energy Center	Union Electric Co - (MO)	White	150.0	2024
6	Clay FC	Clay FC, LLC	Clay	2.0	2021
7	Clendenin A Community Solar, LLC CSG	Clendenin A Community Solar, LLC	Williamson	2.0	2021
8	Clinton Solar 2	Pivot Energy	Clinton	2.0	2025
9	Clinton Solar 2b	Pivot Energy	Clinton	2.0	2024
10	Clinton Solar 4 LLC CSG	Clinton Solar 4 LLC	Clinton	2.0	2020
11	Clinton Solar 4b	Pivot Energy	Clinton	2.0	2025
12	Conagra Foods at St. Elmo	Luminace Solar Illinois 2, LLC	Fayette	1.8	2021
13	Dressor Plains Solar, LLC	Dressor Plains Solar, LLC	Fayette	99.0	2021
14	East Marion IL 1, LLC	SRC Partnership 16, LLC	Williamson	4.0	2025
15	Edwardsville Solar II	Edwardsville Solar II, LLC	Madison	2.0	2021
16	Eldorado Solar I	Sol Systems	Saline	150.0	2025
17	Eldorado Solar II	Sol Systems	Saline	120.0	2025
18	Hickory Solar	Hickory Solar LLC	Jersey	110.0	2024
19	Highland Solar 1, LLC	SREOG IL Partnership 1, LLC	Madison	2.0	2023
20	Hurricane Creek CSG	SPG IL Hurricane Creek Solar LLC	Williamson	2.0	2021
21	IL - Ameresco - Alton	Alton Landfill Solar LLC	Madison	5.0	2025
22	John A Logan College Solar	REA Investments, LLC	Williamson	1.3	2019
23	Kern A Community Solar, LLC CSG	Kern A Community Solar, LLC	Franklin	2.0	2021
24	Kimmel Road Solar, LLC	Birch Creek Power, LLC	Perry	50.0	2024
25	Lukuc B Community Solar LLC CSG	Lukuc B Community Solar LLC	Williamson	2.0	2021
26	Maple Flats	Invenergy Services LLC	Clay	250.0	2024
27	Marathon Petroleum - Robinson Refinery	Onyx Asset Services Group	Crawford	5.0	2025
28	Marine Solar 1, LLC	SREOG IL Partnership 2, LLC	Madison	2.0	2023
29	Marine Solar 2, LLC	SREOG IL Partnership 2, LLC	Madison	2.0	2023
30	Marion Solar 2	Pivot Energy	Marion	1.0	2025
31	Marion Solar 4b LLC	Pivot Energy	Marion	2.0	2024
32	Marlow Solar, LLC CSG	Marlow Solar, LLC	Jefferson	2.0	2020
33	Midwest Power Partners LLC (Pirolo)	SRC Partnership 15 LLC	Madison	5.0	2025
34	Millstadt IL 1, LLC	SRC Partnership 16, LLC	St. Clair	2.5	2025
35	Mound City Solar	Mound City Solar PV	Pulaski	5.0	2024
36	Mulberry Solar, LLC	Reactivate	Madison	2.0	2024
37	NL IL - Kiwi	Standard Solar	Perry	2.0	2025
38	Olney Solar II CSG	Olney Solar II, LLC	Richland	2.0	2021
39	Prairie State Solar Project	Prairie State Solar, LLC	Perry	99.0	2021
40	SCS American Bottoms 009885 Sauget, LLC	Arevon Energy, Inc.	St. Clair	1.8	2020
41	SV CSG Aldridge A, LLC	SREOG IL Partnership 4, LLC	Lawrence	2.0	2023
42	SV CSG Aldridge B, LLC	SREOG IL Partnership 4, LLC	Lawrence	2.0	2023
43	SV CSG Barrass Farms II LL	SV CSG Barrass Farms II LLC	Williamson	2.0	2023
44	SV CSG Bishop 1 LLC	SunVest Solar LLC	Williamson	2.0	2025
45	SV CSG Gander Farms 1 A	SV CSG Gander Farms 1 A, LLC	Williamson	2.0	2025
46	SV CSG Reifschneider I A, LLC	SREOG IL Partnership 4, LLC	St. Clair	1.0	2024
47	SV CSG Reifschneider I B, LLC	SREOG IL Partnership 4, LLC	St. Clair	2.0	2024
48	SV CSG Reifschneider II A, LLC	SREOG IL Partnership 4, LLC	St. Clair	2.0	2024
49	SV CSG Reifschneider II B, LLC	SREOG IL Partnership 4, LLC	St. Clair	2.0	2024
50	SV CSG Reifschneider III A, LLC	SREOG IL Partnership 4, LLC	St. Clair	2.0	2024
51	SV CSG Wagner A LLC	SunVest Solar LLC	Randolph	2.0	2024
52	SV CSG Wagner B LLC	SunVest Solar LLC	Randolph	2.0	2024
53	Sandoval	Sandoval Holdco, LLC	Clinton	2.0	2021
54	Schmidt CSG 1	SunVest Solar LLC	St. Clair	2.0	2024
55	South Belleville Solar, LLC	Dimension Energy LLC	St. Clair	5.0	2025
56	St. Clair Solar 3	Pivot Energy	St. Clair	2.0	2024
57	St. Clair Solar 5	Pivot Energy	St. Clair	5.0	2025
58	Tilden Solar	Sol Systems	Randolph	150.0	2025
59	Toyota Boshoku	Onyx Asset Services Group	Lawrence	4.8	2025
60	Trenton East	Generate Capital	Clinton	2.0	2024
61	Trenton East Phase 2	Generate Capital	Clinton	2.0	2025
62	Trenton West	Generate Capital	Clinton	2.0	2024
63	Trenton West Phase 2	Generate Capital	Clinton	2.0	2025

=== West Central Illinois region ===
Solar Facilities in Illinois (West Central Illinois)
#	Plant Name	Utility Name	County	Capacity (MW)	Operating Year
1	Brimfield Solar	SRC Partnership 15 LLC	Peoria	2.0	2025
2	Buckheart Creek Solar I Community Solar	Buckheart Creek Solar 1, LLC	Fulton	4.5	2025
3	CED Peoria Solar	Bay4 Energy Services, LLC	Peoria	2.0	2021
4	Cameron Solar, LLC - (IL)	SREOG IL Partnership 3, LLC	Peoria	2.0	2023
5	Cass County Renewable Energy Center	Union Electric Co - (MO)	Cass	150.0	2024
6	Clark Solar 1	SRC Partnership 14 LLC	Mason	2.0	2024
7	Clark Solar 1A	SRC Partnership 14 LLC	Mason	2.0	2024
8	Clark Solar 2, LLC	SREOG IL Partnership 2, LLC	Mason	2.0	2023
9	Earp Solar, LLC	Birch Creek Power, LLC	Warren	35.0	2024
10	Elba Solar LLC	Elba Solar LLC	Knox	2.0	2023
11	Essex Solar	SRC Partnership 15 LLC	Stark	4.0	2025
12	Galesburg 650 Solar 1, LLC	SREOG IL Partnership 3, LLC	Knox	2.0	2023
13	Galesburg Solar Array	Onsite Partners, LLC	Henderson	1.4	2020
14	Hopewell Solar, LLC	SREOG IL Partnership 3, LLC	Marshall	1.6	2023
15	IL - ForeFront CS (Brimfield 2)	IL Solar Brimfield Project2, LLC	Peoria	2.0	2025
16	IL West Hallock Project1	IL West Hallock Project1, LLC	Peoria	2.0	2021
17	IL-Forefront-Ameren- Chillicothe 1	IL Solar Chillicothe Project1, LLC	Peoria	2.0	2025
18	Illinois PV Adams 1A	SoCore Energy LLC	Adams	2.0	2025
19	Illinois PV Adams 1B	SoCore Energy LLC	Adams	2.0	2025
20	Illinois PV Adams 2A	SoCore Energy LLC	Adams	2.0	2025
21	Illinois PV Adams 2B	SoCore Energy LLC	Adams	2.0	2025
22	Illinois PV Fulton 1 CSG	Illinois PV Fulton 1, LLC	Fulton	2.0	2020
23	Illinois PV Knox 1A	SoCore Energy LLC	Knox	2.0	2024
24	Illinois PV Knox 1B	SoCore Energy LLC	Knox	2.0	2024
25	Illinois PV Knox 2A	SoCore Energy LLC	Knox	2.0	2025
26	Illinois PV Knox 2B	SoCore Energy LLC	Knox	2.0	2025
27	Illinois PV Knox 3A	SoCore Energy LLC	Knox	2.0	2024
28	Illinois PV Knox 3B	SoCore Energy LLC	Knox	2.0	2024
29	Illinois PV Peoria 2A	SoCore Energy LLC	Peoria	2.0	2025
30	Illinois PV Peoria 2B	SoCore Energy LLC	Peoria	2.0	2025
31	Illinois River Solar 2, LLC	SRC Partnership 16, LLC	Marshall	2.0	2025
32	JM Huber at Quincy	Luminace Solar Illinois 2, LLC	Adams	1.5	2021
33	Macomb 2A	SoCore Energy LLC	McDonough	2.0	2024
34	McDonough Solar 1, LLC CSG	McDonough Solar 1, LLC	McDonough	4.0	2020
35	Morgan Solar 1 CSG	Morgan Solar 1 LLC	Morgan	2.0	2021
36	Morgan Solar 1b CSG	Morgan Solar 1b LLC	Morgan	2.0	2021
37	Morgan Solar 2, LLC CSG	Morgan Solar 2, LLC	Morgan	2.0	2020
38	Morgan Solar 4, LLC CSG	Morgan Solar 4, LLC	Morgan	2.0	2020
39	Pearl St Solar 1, LLC	SREOG IL Partnership 1, LLC	Tazewell	2.0	2023
40	Pekin Community High School	Pekin Community High School, LLC	Tazewell	1.4	2025
41	Peoria County IL S2	SolAmerica Energy, LLC	Peoria	2.0	2025
42	Peoria Solar 3	Pivot Energy	Peoria	4.9	2025
43	Pleasantville Solar Park	Pleasantville Solar Park LLC	Fulton	150.0	2025
44	Prairie Creek Solar	Sol Systems	Morgan	30.0	2023
45	Princeville Solar, LLC	SRC Partnership 16, LLC	Peoria	2.0	2025
46	Richland Township Solar II, LLC	Birch Creek Power, LLC	Marshall	10.8	2025
47	Richland Township Solar, LLC	Birch Creek Power, LLC	Marshall	35.0	2025
48	SCS Galena 012589 Peoria, LLC	Arevon Energy, Inc.	Peoria	2.0	2021
49	Salt Creek Township Solar, LLC	Birch Creek Power, LLC	Mason	50.0	2025
50	Sand Prairie Solar	DG Sand Prairie, LLC	Tazewell	2.0	2024
51	Schmidt Huser Solar, LLC	SREOG IL Partnership 2, LLC	Tazewell	1.5	2023
52	Schulte 2 Community Solar	Schulte 2 Community Solar	Marshall	2.0	2020
53	Shissler Solar	SRC Partnership 15 LLC	Peoria	2.0	2025
54	Sparland Solar, LLC	SREOG IL Partnership 3, LLC	Marshall	2.0	2023
55	Sullivan B Community Solar LLC	Sullivan B Community Solar LLC	McDonough	2.0	2020
56	Tazewell County IL S1	SolAmerica Energy, LLC	Tazewell	2.0	2025
57	USS Clear Creek Solar	SRC Partnership 15 LLC	Cass	3.0	2025
58	Wolf Run Solar	Wolf Run Solar LLC	Morgan	140.0	2024

== History ==
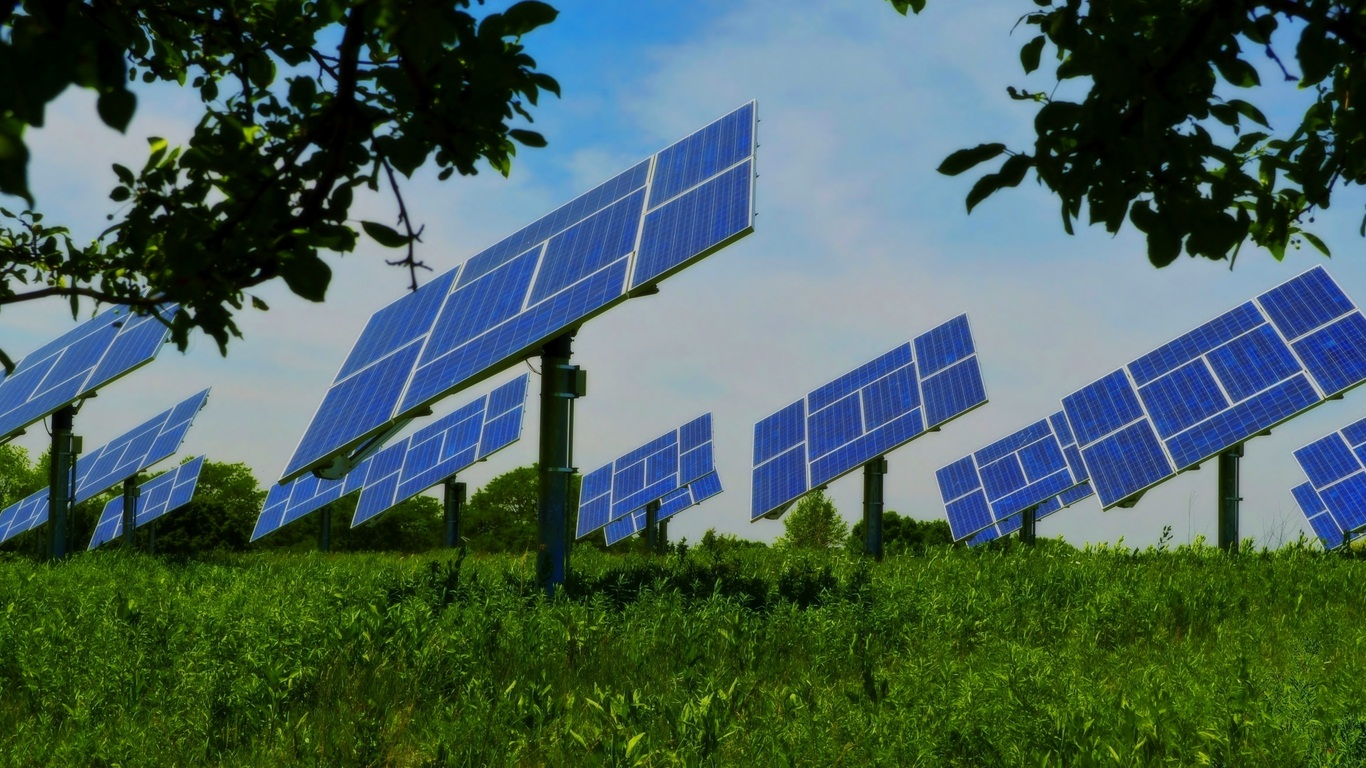
Solar panels, Palatine Township

The first experimental solar power plant was in 1902, in Olney, Illinois, by H.E. Willsie and John Boyle, and was based on a design by Charles Tellier. In 1904 they set up the Willsie Sun company in St. Louis, and built a 6-horsepower motor.

In 2002, Illinois's largest solar array was the 99.4 kW array on the roof of the Field Museum of Natural History, in Chicago.

In 2010 the country's largest urban solar array, 10 MW, was installed in West Pullman, on Chicago's south side. In 2012, IKEA installed solar PV on its two stores in Bolingbrook and Schaumburg totaling almost 2 MW. Also in 2012, the 20 MW Grand Ridge Solar Plant in LaSalle County was completed. The University of Illinois built a 5.87 MW solar farm in 2015 which will provide 2% of the university's electricity.

In November 2016, ComEd attempted to add additional fees to the bills of only residential solar users, commonly called demand charges, in the text of a wider energy bill. They were eventually pulled out of the bill, which passed in December 2016 without them.

== Illinois Solar for All ==
Solar projects that were approved during year five of Illinois Solar for All generated more than 33 GWh per year.

== Statistics ==
Source: NREL

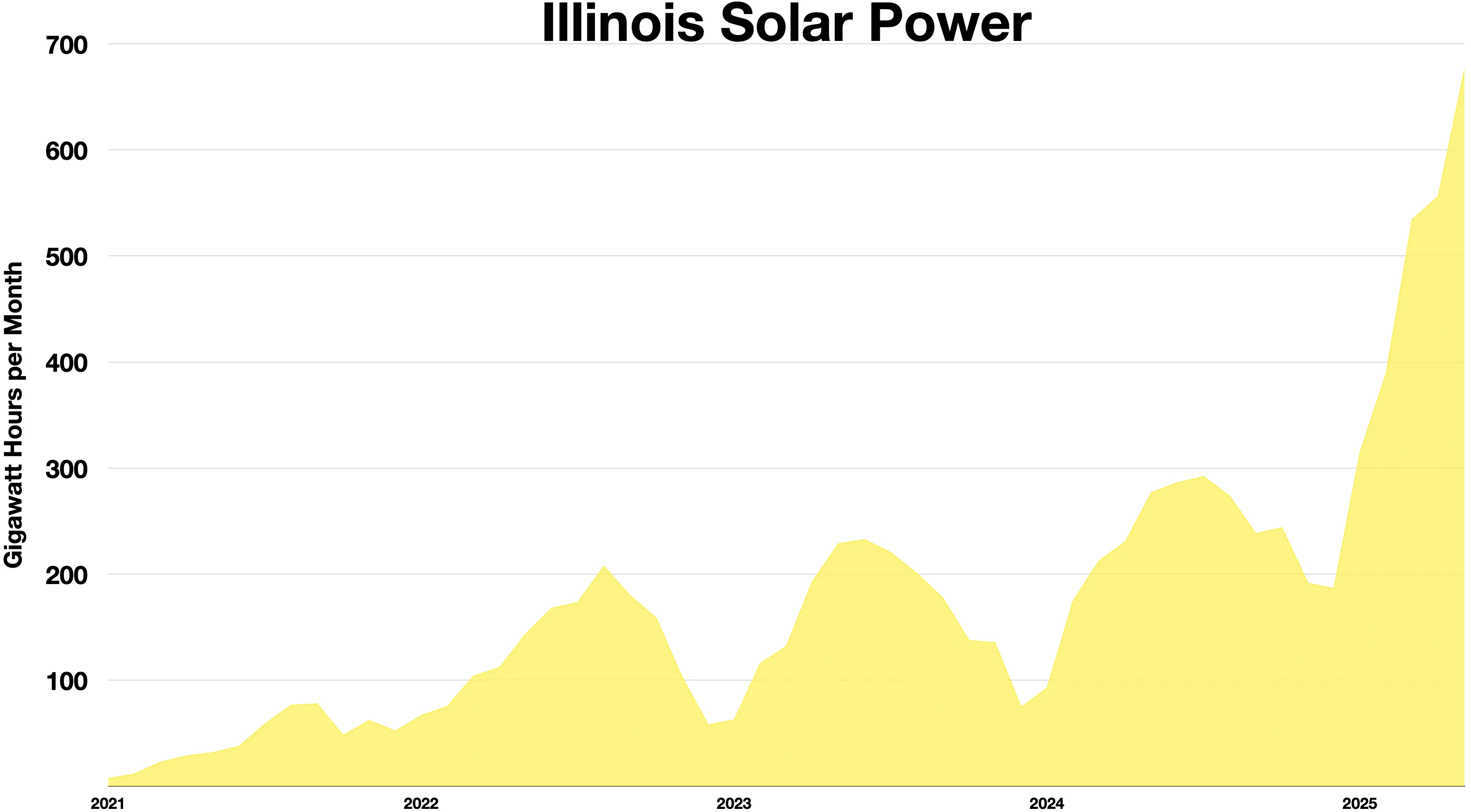
Illinois solar power from 2021 to 2025

Illinois grid-connected PV capacity (MW)
Year	Capacity	Installed	% change
2007	2.2	0.2	10%
2008	2.8	0.4	27%
2009	4.5	1.7	61%
2010	15.5	11	244%
2011	16.2	0.7	5%
2012	42.9	26.7	165%
2013	43.4	0.5	1%
2014	54	10.6	24%
2015	65	11	20%
2016	70	5	8%
2017	81	11	16%
2018	106.2	25.2	31%
2019	211.5	105.3	99%
2020	465.4	253.9	120%
2021	1,107.1	641.7	%
2022	2,036	928.9	%

Utility-scale solar generation in Illinois (GWh)
Year	Total	Jan	Feb	Mar	Apr	May	Jun	Jul	Aug	Sep	Oct	Nov	Dec
2010	14	0	0	1	1	2	2	2	2	2	1	1	0
2011	16	1	1	1	1	2	2	2	2	1	1	1	1
2012	31	1	1	2	2	4	4	4	3	3	3	2	2
2013	53	2	3	4	4	4	5	5	5	5	6	5	5
2014	50	2	2	4	4	5	6	5	5	5	5	4	3
2015	48	2	3	4	5	5	5	5	5	4	4	3	3
2016	49	2	4	3	4	5	5	5	5	5	4	4	3
2017	54	2	4	4	4	6	7	6	6	6	3	3	3
2018	65	3	3	6	7	7	7	8	7	6	5	3	3
2019	63	3	3	6	6	6	7	8	7	6	5	3	3
2020	93	2	4	4	6	7	9	9	10	8	6	6	8
2021	528	13	16	24	28	34	36	60	61	79	55	69	53
2022	1,601	73	83	110	121	148	167	175	206	182	162	107	67
2023	1,911	70	116	137	194	228	232	220	200	177	137	135	74
2024	2,210	92	174	212	229	274	282	288	269	236	242		

== See also ==
- List of power stations in Illinois § Solar photovoltaic
- Wind power in Illinois
- Solar power in the United States
- Renewable energy in the United States
