= Hutsonville, Illinois =

- Village
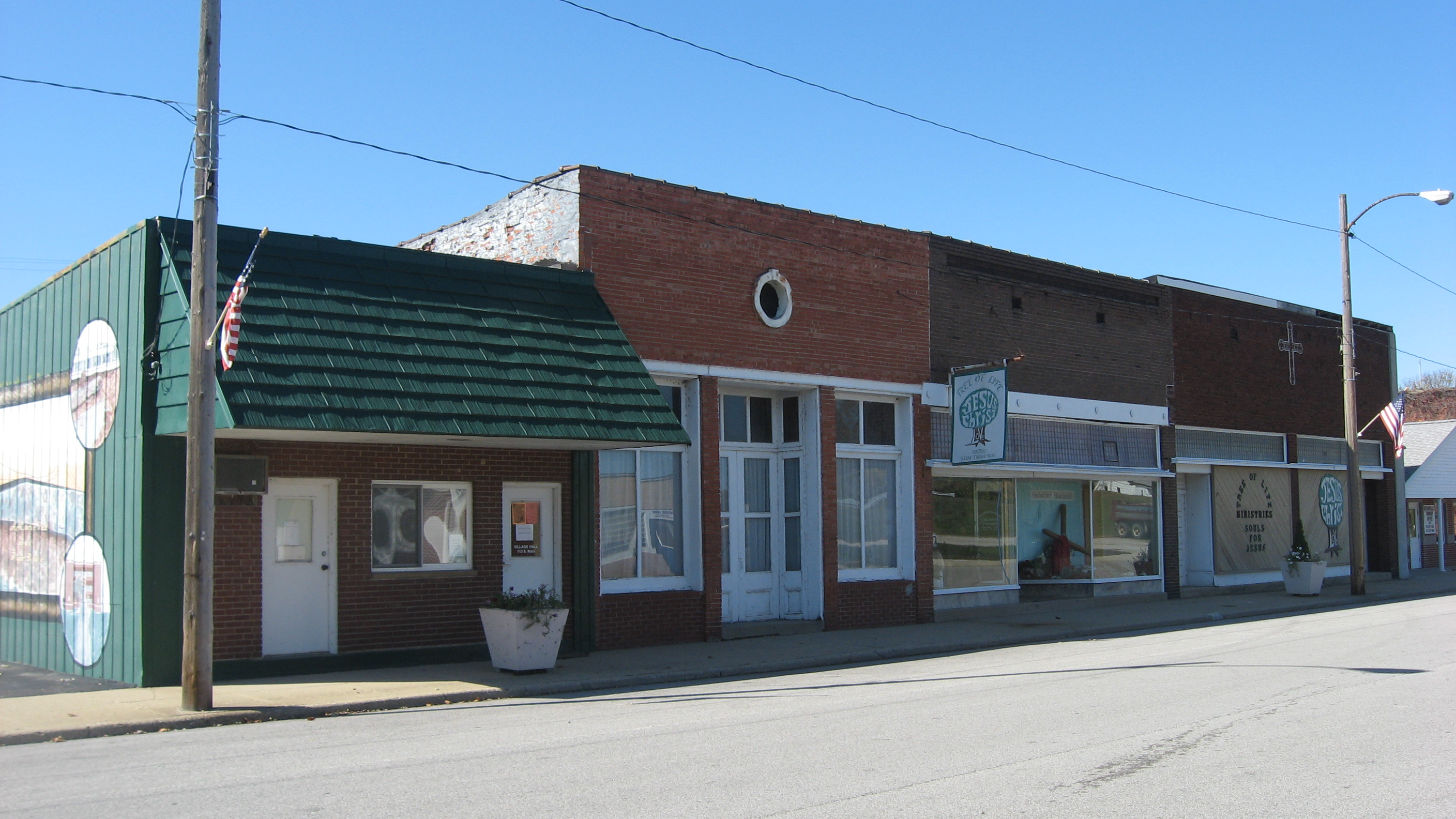
- Downtown Hutsonville

- Location of Hutsonville in Crawford County, Illinois.
- Coordinates: 39°06′30″N 87°39′39″W
- Country: United States
- State: Illinois
- County: Crawford

Area
  - Total: 0.62 sq mi (1.61 km^{2})
  - Land: 0.62 sq mi (1.61 km^{2})
  - Water: 0 sq mi (0.00 km^{2})
- Elevation: 449 ft (137 m)

Population (2020)
  - Total: 478
  - Density: 768.8/sq mi (296.84/km^{2})
- Time zone: UTC-6 (CST)
  - Summer (DST): UTC-5 (CDT)
- ZIP code: 62433
- Area code: 618
- FIPS code: 17–36841
- GNIS feature ID: 2398565

Hutsonville is a village in Crawford County, Illinois, United States. The population was 478 at the 2020 census.

== Geography ==
Hutsonville is located in northeastern Crawford County along the Wabash River. Its eastern border is formed by the river, which is also the Indiana state line. The main east–west street through the village is Clover Street, which crosses the river to become Indiana State Road 154, which leads east 15 miles (24 km) to Sullivan, Indiana. Clover Street leads west 1.5 miles (2.4 km) to Illinois Route 1, which runs north 20 miles (32 km) to Marshall and south 26 miles (42 km) to Lawrenceville. Hutsonville's Main Street leads south as County Route 5, 8 miles (13 km) to Palestine.

According to the 2010 census, Hutsonville has a total area of 0.62 square miles (1.61 km^{2}), all land.

== Demographics ==
Historical population
Census	Pop.	Note	%±
1880	418		—
1890	582		39.2%
1900	743		27.7%
1910	722		−2.8%
1920	665		−7.9%
1930	604		−9.2%
1940	714		18.2%
1950	647		−9.4%
1960	583		−9.9%
1970	544		−6.7%
1980	705		29.6%
1990	622		−11.8%
2000	568		−8.7%
2010	554		−2.5%
2020	478		−13.7%
U.S. Decennial Census

As of the 2020 census there were 478 people, 255 households, and 136 families residing in the village. The population density was 768.49 inhabitants per square mile (296.72/km^{2}). There were 221 housing units at an average density of 355.31 units per square mile (137.19 units/km^{2}). The racial makeup of the village was 94.14% White, 1.26% African American, 0.42% Native American, 0.63% Asian, 0.84% from other races, and 2.72% from two or more races. Hispanic or Latino of any race were 3.35% of the population.

There were 255 households, out of which 20.8% had children under the age of 18 living with them, 47.06% were married couples living together, 2.35% had a female householder with no husband present, and 46.67% were non-families. 27.45% of all households were made up of individuals, and 9.41% had someone living alone who was 65 years of age or older. The average household size was 2.77 and the average family size was 2.09.

The village's age distribution consisted of 16.0% under the age of 18, 14.3% from 18 to 24, 23.6% from 25 to 44, 26.8% from 45 to 64, and 19.4% who were 65 years of age or older. The median age was 40.7 years. For every 100 females, there were 99.3 males. For every 100 females age 18 and over, there were 121.9 males.

The median income for a household in the village was $46,875, and the median income for a family was $75,833. Males had a median income of $22,000 versus $28,750 for females. The per capita income for the village was $23,468. About 15.4% of families and 24.2% of the population were below the poverty line, including 15.6% of those under age 18 and 12.7% of those age 65 or over.

== Economy ==
Hutsonville Power Station was a coal-fired power plant located north of Hutsonville. Electricity was generated at the power plant until its closure in 2011.
