= Hutsonville Power Station =

Former coal-fired power plant in Hutsonville, Illinois

- Country: United States
- Location: Hutsonville Township, Crawford County, near Hutsonville, Illinois
- Coordinates: 39°08′02″N 87°39′36″W
- Status: Decommissioned
- Commission date: Unit 1: 1940; Unit 2: 1941; Unit 3: 1953; Unit 4: 1954
- Decommission date: Units 1–2: 1981; Units 3–4: 2011
- Owner: Ameren

Thermal power station
- Primary fuel: Coal
- Cooling source: Wabash River

Power generation
- Units operational: 4
- Nameplate capacity: 151 MW

Hutsonville Power Station was a coal-fired power plant located north of Hutsonville, Illinois in Crawford County, Illinois. The power plant closed in 2011. It was operated by Ameren.

== History ==
Hutsonville Power Station came online in 1940 generating 31 megawatts (MW) of electricity. Unit 2 came online the following year and Units 3 and 4 came online in 1953 and 1954 respectively. Units 1 and 2 were decommissioned in 1981. At the time of its closure, Hutsonville had two active units generating a combined 151 MW. Coal used to generate electricity was extracted at nearby coal mines in Illinois and Indiana until 2006. In 2004, Hutsonville began the transition to burning coal delivered from the Powder River Basin. Towards the end of its useful life, Hutsonville generated electricity sporadically as it was one of Ameren's least efficient power plants. Rather than complying to the Environmental Protection Agency's (EPA) Cross-State Air Pollution Rule, Ameren announced they would close the Hutsonville Power plant by the end of 2011. In early 2015, Ameren demolished Hutsonville Power Plant following three years of decommissioning.

== See also ==
- List of power stations in Illinois
