= Mendota Hills Wind Farm =

Wind farm in Illinois, United States

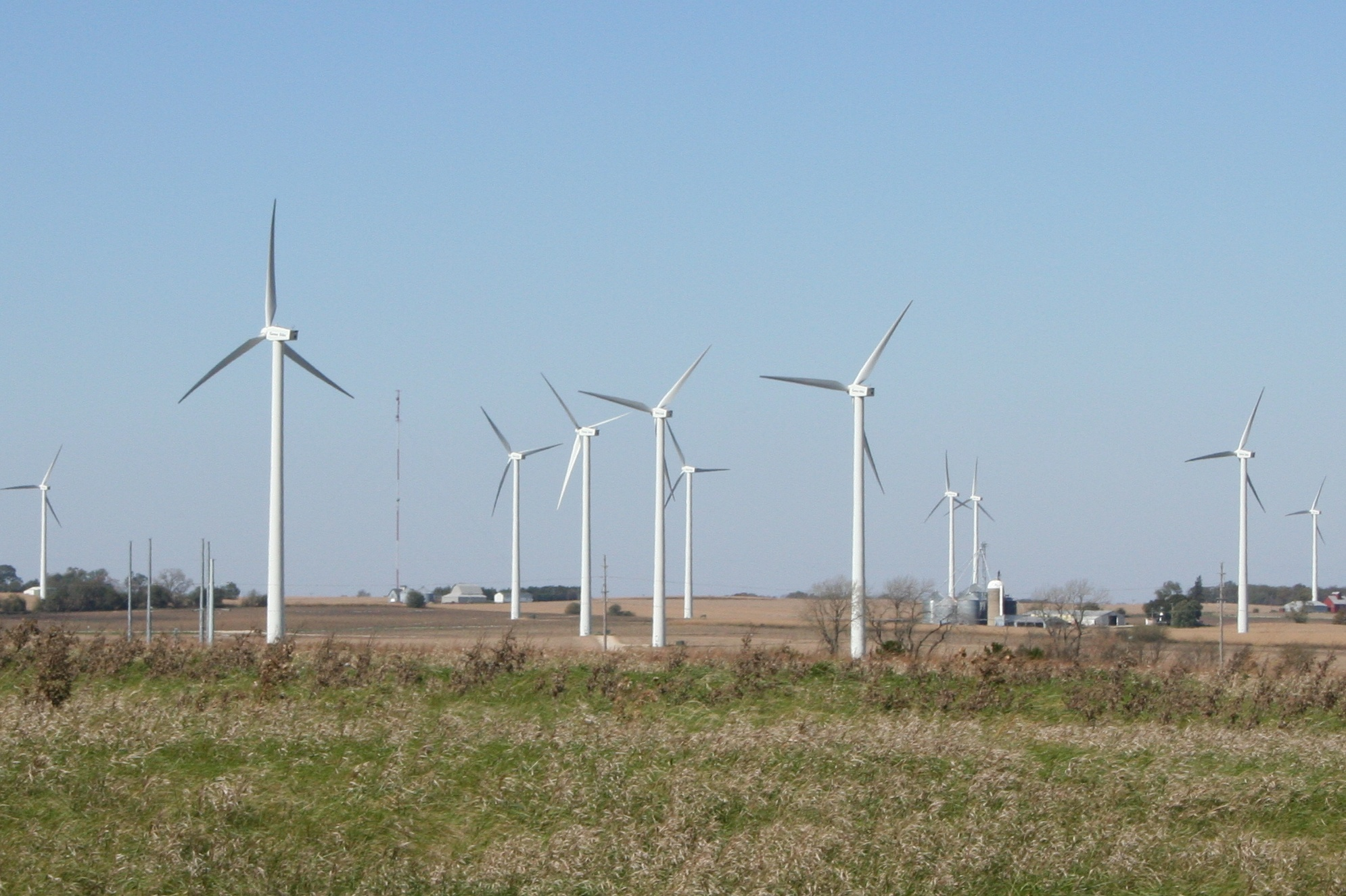
- The Mendota Hills Wind Farm in southeast Lee county just west of Interstate 39 exit 82
- Country: USA
- Location: Paw Paw, Illinois
- Coordinates: 41°43′27.4″N 89°2′51.8″W
- Status: Active
- Commission date: 2003
- Owner: Leeward Renewable Energy

Wind farm
- Type: Onshore

Power generation
- Units operational: 29 x 2.625 MW
- Make and model: SiemensGamesa G126
- Nameplate capacity: 76.2 MW
- Storage capacity: 76 MW

External links
- Commons: Related media on Commons

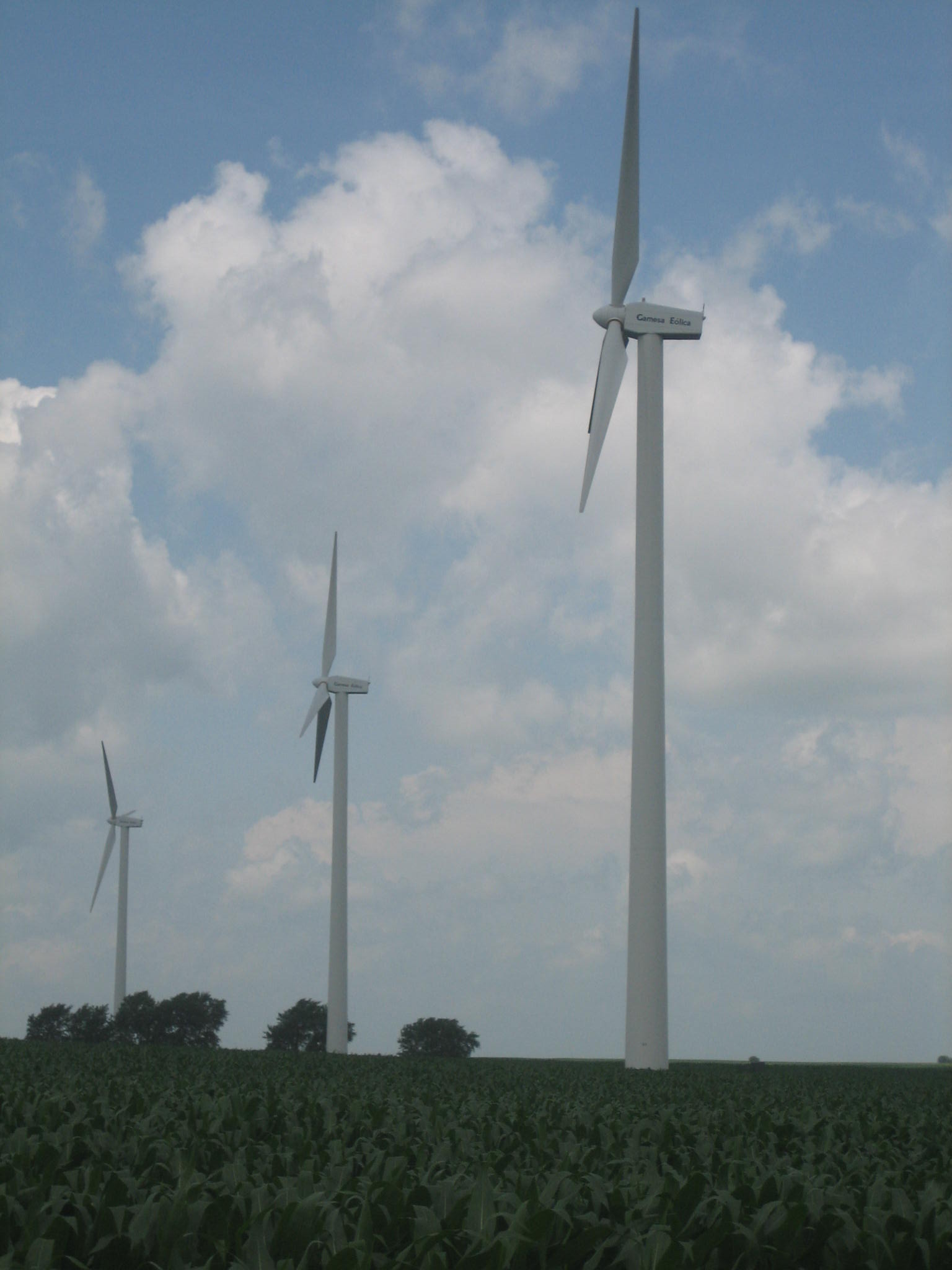
Three of the turbines at Mendota Hills Wind Farm.

The Mendota Hills Wind Farm is a wind farm in Lee County, Illinois near the village of Paw Paw. It operates 29 wind turbines. Each wind turbine stands 214 ft (65.23 m) tall and has three 85 ft (35.91 m) long blades. The wind farm was constructed from June 2003 to November 24, 2003. Mendota Hills was the first utility-scale wind farm in the state of Illinois.

== Description ==
The Mendota Hills Wind Farm originally consisted of 63 Gamesa G52-800 kW wind turbines, each costing around US$1 million. Each turbine stands 214 feet (65 m) tall and has a diameter of 171 feet (52 m) across the rotor, the two ton rotors spin at 25 rpm. Each of the three blades measure 83 ft (25.91 m) long.

In 2019, the wind farm reduced the number of turbines to 29, but increased the nameplate capacity to 76 MW.

The turbine towers are spread out over 2,200 acres (890 ha) of Lee County, Illinois, near the village of Paw Paw and adjacent to Interstate 39. The wind farm was developed by Navitas Energy, and is now owned and operated by Leeward . Energy produced at Mendota Hills is sold to Commonwealth Edison. Each tower has a 2.5 megawatt capacity giving a total capacity at Mendota Hills Wind Farm of 72.6 megawatts. The site produces enough power (approximately 110 million kilowatt hours annually) to power about 13,000 homes. 29 SG126-2.5's were put up on their place in 2019

== History ==
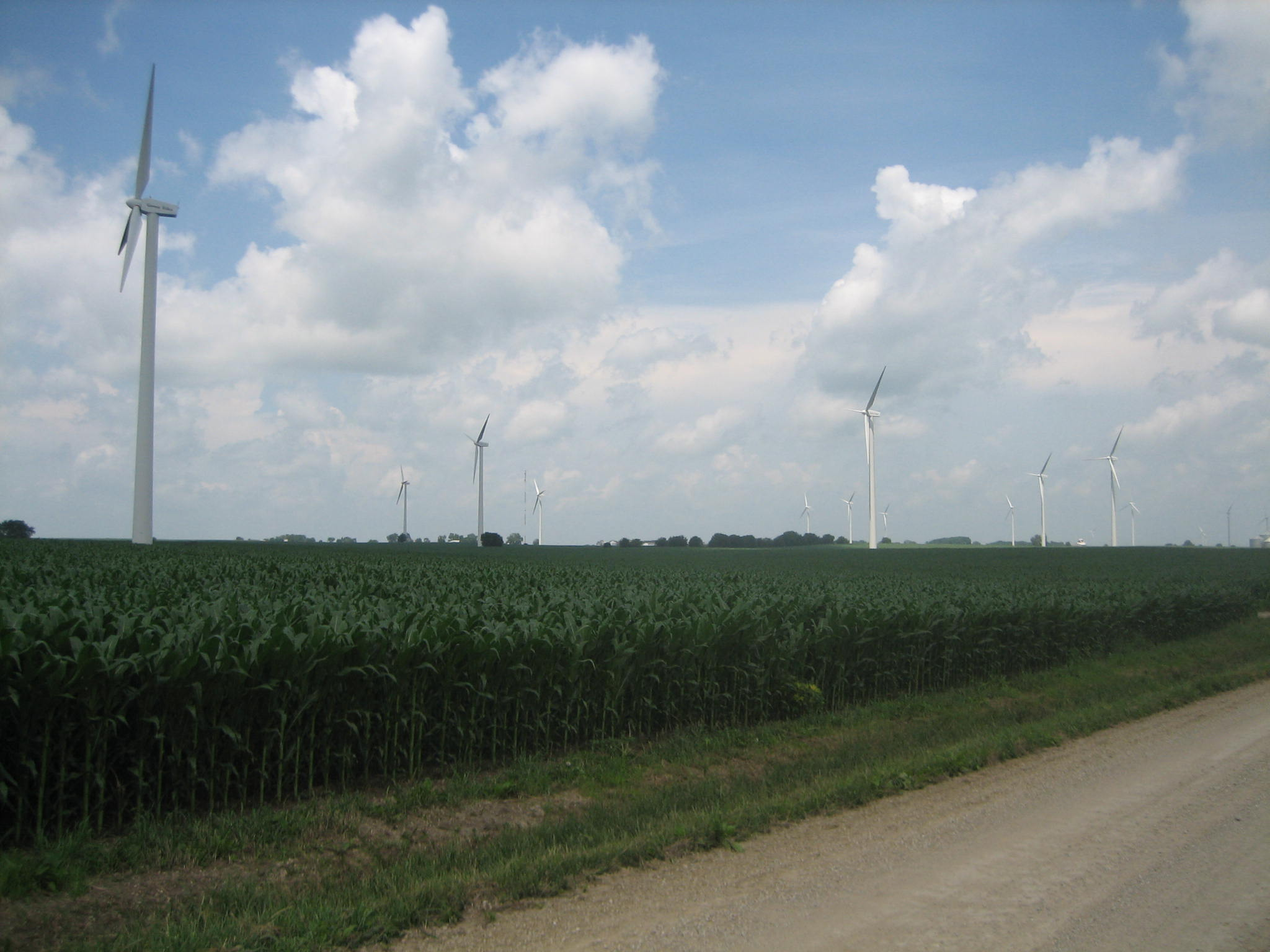
The Mendota Hills Wind Farm looking northwest near I-39

The Mendota Hills Wind Farm's beginnings are rooted in the spring of 2002 when land owners were first approached about the wind towers. For the two years previous to that wind metering had been taking place in the area where the wind farm is located today. Construction could only begin, in June 2003, after a series of environmental and archaeological tests and approval from the Lee County Zoning Board. Construction on the wind farm was complete by November 2003 and the Mendota Hills Wind Farm officially went online on November 24, 2003. Landowners and farmers are compensated by the developer, Navitas Energy of Minneapolis, Minnesota, on a contractual basis. Most landowners are paid US$1,200 to $1,500 per megawatt of electricity produced on each tower.

== See also ==
- Twin Groves Wind Farm
- Wind power in Illinois
