= Emden, Illinois =

Emden
- Village
- Location of Emden in Logan County, Illinois.
- Coordinates: 40°17′54″N 89°29′06″W
- Country: United States
- State: Illinois
- County: Logan

Area
  - Total: 0.24 sq mi (0.61 km^{2})
  - Land: 0.24 sq mi (0.61 km^{2})
  - Water: 0 sq mi (0.00 km^{2})
- Elevation: 591 ft (180 m)

Population (2020)
  - Total: 467
  - Density: 1,989.0/sq mi (767.96/km^{2})
- Time zone: UTC-6 (CST)
  - Summer (DST): UTC-5 (CDT)
- ZIP code: 62635
- Area code: 217
- GNIS ID: 2398825
- FIPS code: 17-23971
- Website: www.villageofemden.com

Emden is a village in Logan County, Illinois, United States. The population was 467 at the 2020 census. The village was named after Emden, Germany due to the large number of residents who immigrated to the area from villages along the River Ems

The first newspaper published in Emden was The Emden Star in 1893.

== Geography ==
According to the 2021 census gazetteer files, Emden has a total area of 0.24 square miles (0.62 km^{2}), all land.

== Demographics ==
Historical population
Census	Pop.	Note	%±
1880	143		—
1900	330		—
1910	411		24.5%
1920	462		12.4%
1930	401		−13.2%
1940	396		−1.2%
1950	406		2.5%
1960	502		23.6%
1970	552		10.0%
1980	527		−4.5%
1990	459		−12.9%
2000	515		12.2%
2010	485		−5.8%
2020	467		−3.7%
Decennial US Census

As of the 2020 census there were 467 people, 172 households, and 111 families residing in the village. The population density was 1,987.23 inhabitants per square mile (767.27/km^{2}). There were 232 housing units at an average density of 987.23 per square mile (381.17/km^{2}). The racial makeup of the village was 94.65% White, 0.64% African American, 0.00% Native American, 0.64% Asian, 0.00% Pacific Islander, 0.86% from other races, and 3.21% from two or more races. Hispanic or Latino of any race were 1.28% of the population.

There were 172 households, out of which 33.1% had children under the age of 18 living with them, 48.26% were married couples living together, 11.63% had a female householder with no husband present, and 35.47% were non-families. 35.47% of all households were made up of individuals, and 20.93% had someone living alone who was 65 years of age or older. The average household size was 2.97 and the average family size was 2.31.

The village's age distribution consisted of 31.2% under the age of 18, 3.8% from 18 to 24, 23.4% from 25 to 44, 18.6% from 45 to 64, and 23.1% who were 65 years of age or older. The median age was 35.0 years. For every 100 females, there were 110.6 males. For every 100 females age 18 and over, there were 83.9 males.

The median income for a household in the village was $55,000, and the median income for a family was $68,438. Males had a median income of $48,750 versus $33,250 for females. The per capita income for the village was $27,676. About 5.4% of families and 4.5% of the population were below the poverty line, including 0.0% of those under age 18 and 15.2% of those age 65 or over.

== Attractions ==
Rail Splitter Wind Farm is centered on the village of Emden.
