= Sugar Creek Wind Farm =

Wind farm in Logan County, Illinois, United States

- Country: USA
- Location: Logan County, Illinois
- Coordinates: 40°08′36″N 89°31′57″W
- Status: Active
- Construction began: 2019
- Owner: Liberty Power

Wind farm
- Type: Onshore
- Hub height: 96m

Power generation
- Units operational: 57 (40 x 4.2 mW, 17 x 2.0 mW)
- Storage capacity: 202 MW

External links
- Website: https://sugarcreekwind.com

The Sugar Creek Wind Farm is a 57-turbine wind farm in western Logan County in the U.S. state of Illinois. The project was developed by Liberty Power, a subsidiary of Algonquin Power and Utilities.

== Detail ==
The Sugar Creek complex's 57 wind turbines were completed in December 2019. Of the 57 turbines, 40 are rated at 4.2 mW, and 17 are rated at 2.0 mW. The turbines were raised in 2019-2020, and have an expected lifespan of 30+ years. The turbines can generate up to 202.0 megawatts of electricity.
