= Whitney Hill Wind Farm =

Wind farm in Illinois, U.S.

- Country: USA
- Location: Mount Pulaski, Illinois
- Coordinates: 39°57′25″N 89°18′40″W
- Status: Active
- Construction began: 2019
- Owner: Enel Green Power

Wind farm
- Type: Onshore

Power generation
- Units operational: 21 x 2.8 MW, 3 x 2.3 MW
- Make and model: GE Renewable Energy
- Annual net output: 246GWh

The Whitney Hill Wind Farm is a 24-turbine wind farm near Mount Pulaski in southeastern Logan County in the U.S. state of Illinois. The project was developed by Enel Green Power.

== Detail ==
The Whitney Hill complex's 24 wind turbines were completed in December 2019. The project was designed to generate a maximum of 65.3 megawatts of electricity. The Whitney Hill complex utilizes leasehold rights to 5,000 acres of land.
