= California Ridge Wind Farm =

Wind farm in Illinois, United States

- Country: USA
- Location: Armstrong, Illinois
- Coordinates: 40°11′42.6″N 87°50′44.8″W
- Status: Active
- Owner: Invenergy

Wind farm
- Type: Onshore
- Rotor diameter: diameter 100 m

Power generation
- Units operational: 134 x 1.6 mW
- Make and model: GE Energy 1.6-100
- Storage capacity: 217.0 MW

The California Ridge Wind Farm is a 134-turbine wind farm in eastern Champaign County and western Vermilion County in Illinois. The project was developed by Invenergy, an energy holding company.

== Detail ==
The California Ridge complex's 134 wind turbines, each rated at 1.6 mW, were completed in December 2012. The turbines can generate up to 217.0 megawatts of electricity. The complex utilizes leasehold rights to 27,700 acres of Illinois land, and employs approximately 14 full-time workers in its ongoing operations. Power generated by the project was pre-sold to the Tennessee Valley Authority.
