= Bishop Hill Wind Farms =

Wind farms in Illinois, United States

- Country: USA
- Location: Illinois
- Coordinates: 41°11′N 90°12′W
- Status: Active
- Construction began: 2011
- Commission date: 2012
- Owner: Invenergy
- Employees: 20

Wind farm
- Type: Onshore
- Hub height: 100m

Power generation
- Units operational: 201
- Make and model: GE Renewable Energy 1.6 MW XLE, GE Renewable Energy 1.5 MW XLE
- Storage capacity: 424 MW

The Bishop Hill Wind Farms are three Illinois wind farms containing a total of 201 turbines in Henry County. Developed in 2012 through 2018, as a complex the three wind farms have a nameplate capacity of 424.0 megawatts of electricity.

== Operations ==
The Bishop Hill Wind Farms were developed by Invenergy. They are officially designated as Bishop Hill I (98 turbines), opened in 2012; Bishop Hill II (50 turbines), opened in 2012; and Bishop Hill III (53 turbines), opened in 2018. Invenergy has sold 80 percent of Bishop Hill III to the WEC Energy Group. Under Illinois law, wind farms can be subdivided into separate entities for ownership, land lease, and tax purposes.
