= Streator Cayuga Ridge South Wind Farm =

- Country: United States
- Location: Livingston County, Illinois
- Coordinates: 40°57′20″N 88°28′54″W
- Commission date: March 2010
- Owner: Iberdrola Renewables

Wind farm
- Type: Onshore

Power generation
- Units operational: 150
- Nameplate capacity: 300 MW

The 300 MW Streator Cayuga Ridge South Wind Farm, located near Odell, Illinois, officially started generating power in March 2010.

Many of the wind farm's turbines can be easily seen from Interstate 55.

== See also ==
- List of onshore wind farms
- List of wind farms in the United States
