= Rail Splitter Wind Farm =

Wind farm in Illinois, United States

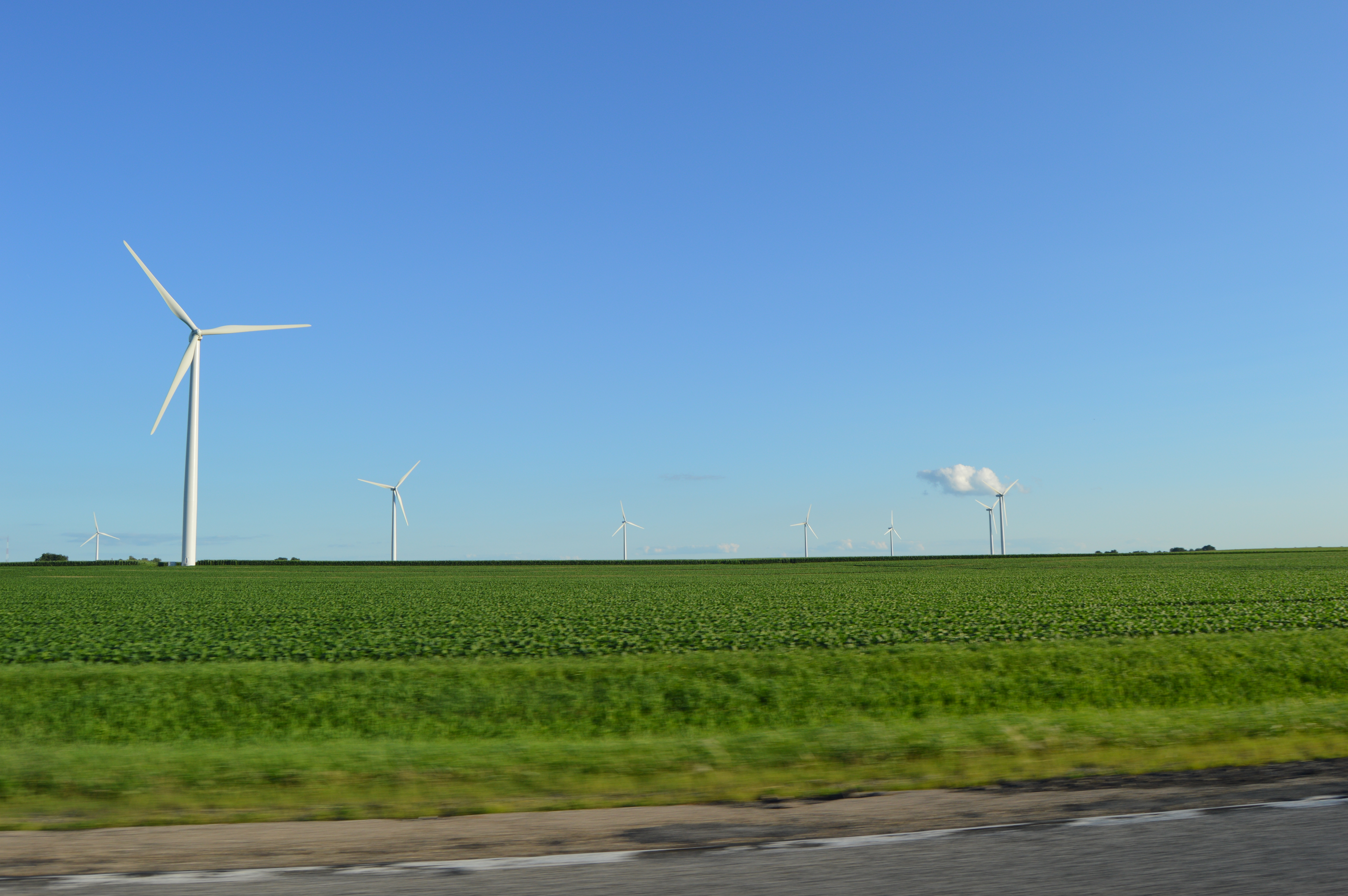
- Eastern portion of the farm
- Country: USA
- Location: Emden, Illinois
- Coordinates: 40°18′0″N 89°24′0″W
- Status: Active
- Construction cost: $221 million
- Operator: EDPR NA
- Employees: 20

Wind farm
- Type: Onshore

Power generation
- Units operational: 67 x 1.5 MW
- Make and model: GE sle
- Nameplate capacity: 100.5 MW
- Storage capacity: 100.5 MW

External links
- Website: https://www.edpr.com/north-america/rail-splitter-wind-farm

The Rail Splitter Wind Farm is a 67-turbine wind farm in northern Logan County and southern Tazewell County in the U.S. state of Illinois. The wind farm is near the towns of Delavan, Hopedale, and Emden on a glacial moraine known as Union Ridge.

== Operation ==
The turbines generate a maximum of 100.5 megawatts of electricity. The wind farm is owned and operated by EDP Renewables North America (EDPR NA), formerly Horizon Wind Energy. The wind turbines that constitute the farm are centered on the town of Emden on both sides of Interstate 155. The wind farm, constructed in 2008–2009 at a cost of $200.0 million, was dedicated on July 21, 2009.

=== Expansion ===
Rail Splitter II is a wind farm that will be located in Tazewell County, near the townships of Boynton, Hopedale, Hittle, and Little Mackinaw. The expansion will add capacity of 100 megawatts (MW) with 20-28 planned turbines. The model is expected to be determined in 2023.

In June 2022, a group of Mackinaw farmers known as United Citizens of Tazewell County LLC presented a rewrite of the county ordinance for wind farms. If passed, this change would affect the turbines at Rail Splitter and the proposed Rail Splitter II.
