= HillTopper Wind Farm =

Wind farm in Illinois, United States

- Country: USA
- Location: Logan County, Illinois
- Coordinates: 39°57′40″N 89°17′30″W
- Status: Active
- Construction began: April 9, 2018
- Owner: Enel Green Power

Wind farm
- Type: Onshore

Power generation
- Units operational: 74 x 2.5 MW
- Nameplate capacity: 185 MW
- Annual net output: 570 GWh

External links
- Website: https://www.enelgreenpower.com

The HillTopper Wind Farm is a 74-turbine wind farm near Mount Pulaski in southeastern Logan County in the U.S. state of Illinois. The turbines were designed to generate a maximum of 185 megawatts of electricity. The complex was completed by Enel Green Power at a cost of approximately $325 million, and entered operations in 2018.

== Detail ==
The HillTopper complex's 74 wind turbines are each rated at 2.5 MW. The project's overall 185 MW capacity was pre-sold to Bloomberg LP, Danone North America, General Motors, and Starbucks. The complex utilizes leasehold rights to 7,500 acres of land.
