= Pioneer Trail Wind Farm =

- Country: USA
- Coordinates: 40°27′22.9″N 87°58′42.6″W
- Status: Active
- Construction began: 2011
- Owner: RWE
- Operator: RWE

Wind farm
- Type: Onshore
- Hub height: 400 ft

Power generation
- Units operational: 94 x 1.6 mW
- Make and model: GE Renewable Energy
- Storage capacity: 150.4 MW

The Pioneer Trail Wind Farm is a 94-turbine wind farm, established in 2011, in Ford County and Iroquois County in Illinois. The wind farm is headquartered in the Ford County seat of Paxton.

== Detail ==
The Pioneer Trail complex's 94 wind turbines, each rated at 1.6 mW, can generate up to 150.4 megawatts of electricity. The northeastern Illinois project was developed by E.ON Climate Renewables, a subsidiary of E.ON, which merged with RWE in 2019. E.ON has resold some of the power generated by Pioneer Trail to the Southern Illinois Power Cooperative.

The wind farm became operational in October 2011.
