= Invenergy =

American power generation development and operations company

Invenergy is an American-based multinational power generation development and operations company. The company develops, builds, owns and operates power generation and energy storage projects in the Americas, Europe and Asia, including wind, solar, and natural gas power generation and energy storage facilities. It is North America's largest privately held renewable power generation company.

According to Invenergy, the company has developed over 220 projects totaling 36 gigawatts of capacity. These totals include projects in operation, under construction or contracted.

== History ==
Founded in 2001 after the sale of SkyGen Energy to Calpine Corporation by Michael Polsky, who today serves as Founder & CEO, the firm is based in Chicago, Illinois. Invenergy also has North American offices in Denver, Portland, Toronto, and Mexico City. European activity is centered in Warsaw. The company also has offices in Tokyo, Medellín, and San Salvador.

In January 2013, Quebec's public pension fund manager, the Caisse de dépôt et placement du Québec, invested $500 million in the company's portfolio of operating wind farms. As of 2018, CDPQ has 52.4% economic ownership of Invenergy Renewables, while the company still retains managerial control. The Blackstone Group invested approximately $3 Billion for a minority stake in Invenergy in early 2022.

A now bankrupt yieldco of SunEdison, TerraForm Power, agreed to acquire wind assets in 2015.

In July 2017, Invenergy, in partnership with GE Renewable Energy, announced plans to construct the largest wind farm in the United States, the Wind Catcher Energy Project. However, the project was scrapped in 2018 due to regulatory resistance from state agencies.

In April 2020, Invenergy announced its plans to begin construction of a $200 million solar farm in Lake County, Indiana in 2022.

== See also ==
- Wind Power
