= Twin Groves Wind Farm =

Wind farm in Illinois, USA

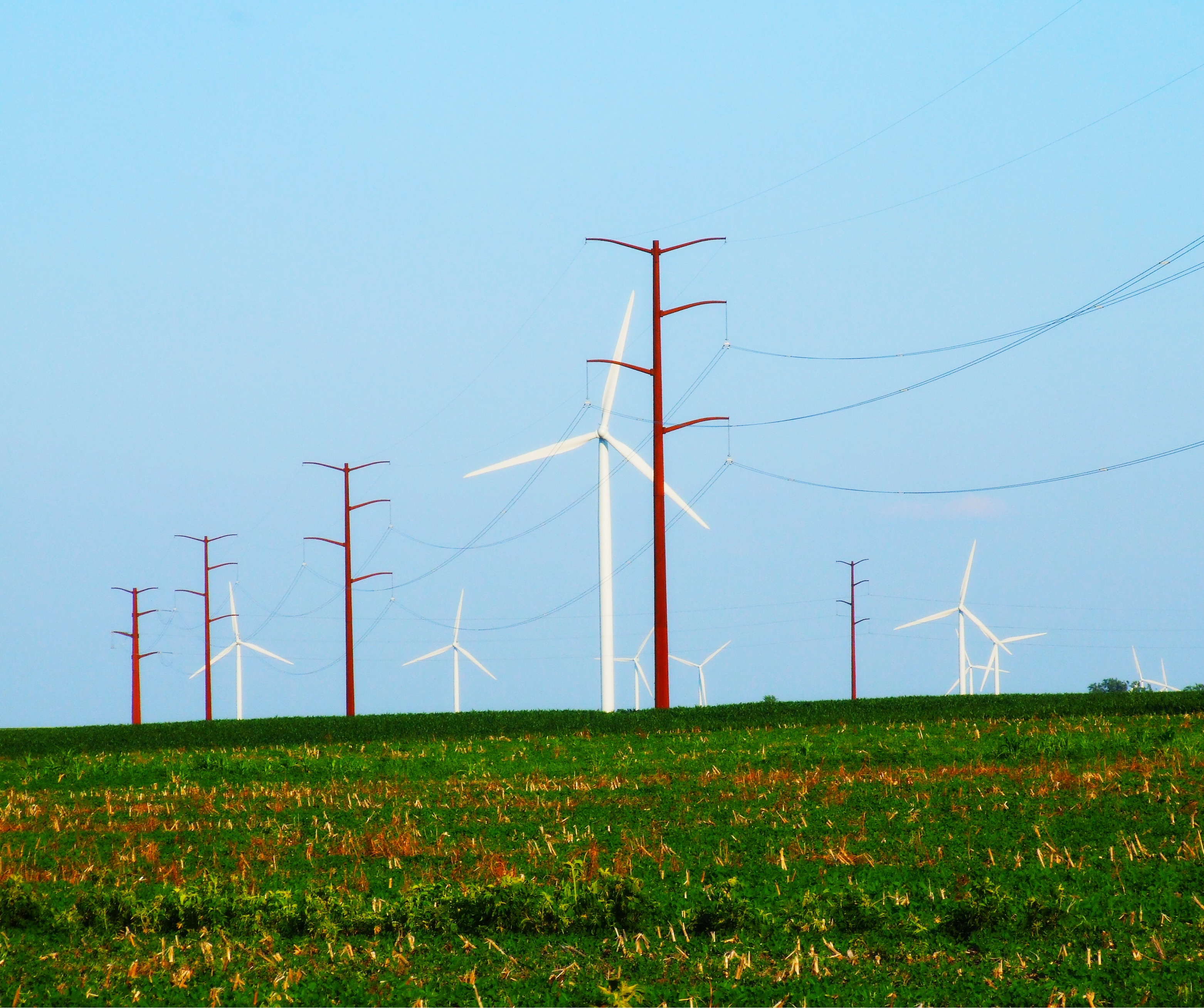
- Country: United States
- Location: McLean County, Illinois, Illinois
- Coordinates: 40°28′54″N 88°42′26″W
- Construction cost: $700 million
- Owner: EDP Renewables North America
- Operator: EDP Renewables North America

Wind farm
- Type: Onshore
- Hub height: 280 ft
- Site area: 22,000 acres (8,903.1 ha)

Power generation
- Units operational: 240 turbines
- Make and model: Vestas V82-1.65 MW
- Nameplate capacity: 396 MW
- Capacity factor: 33.5% (average 2008–2018)
- Annual net output: 1,162 GW·h

External links
- Website: twingroveswindfarm.com
- Commons: Related media on Commons

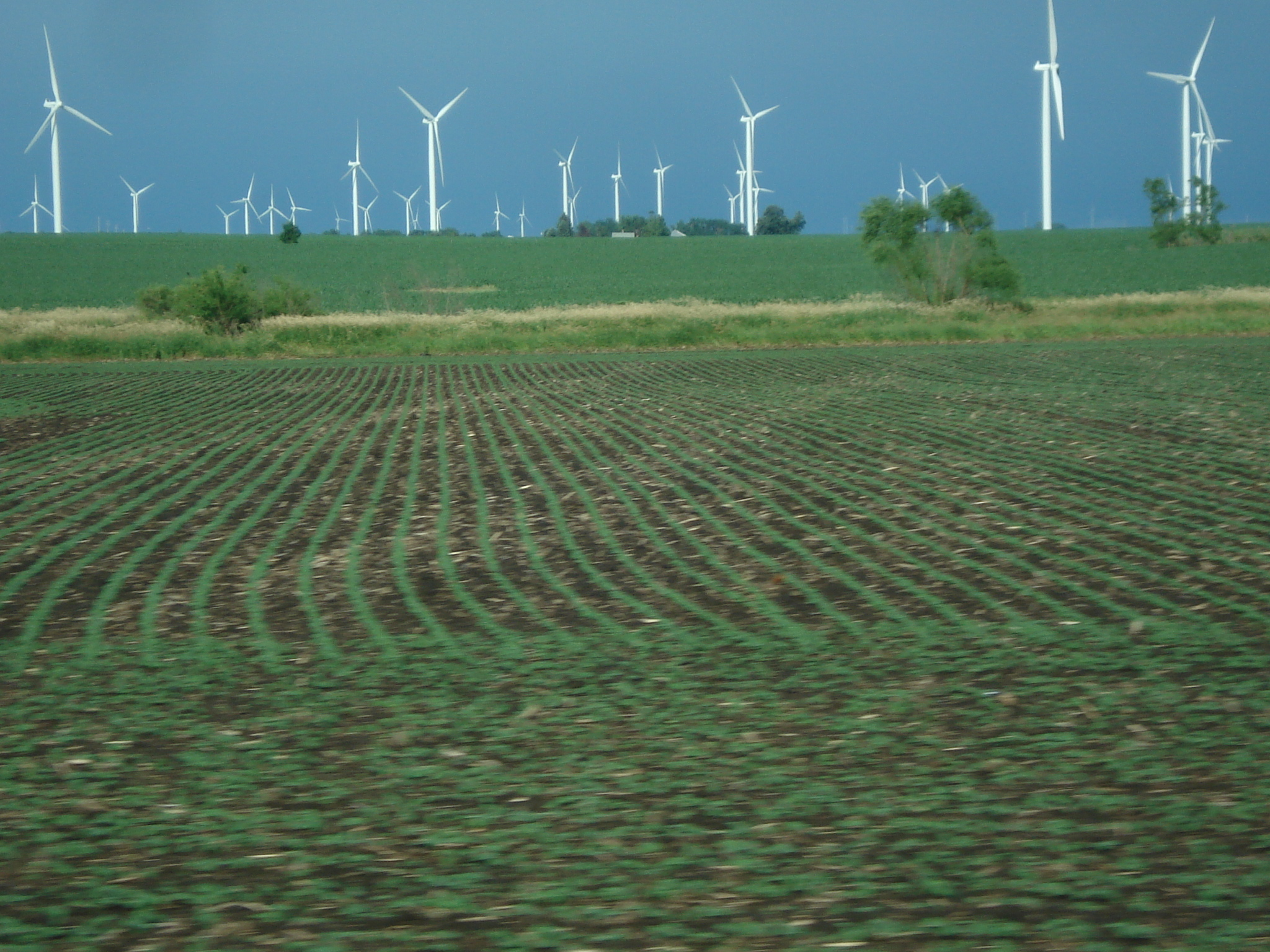
Twin Groves Wind Farm from McLean County Route 21

Twin Groves Wind Farm is a wind farm in the U.S. state of Illinois, near the villages of Arrowsmith, Saybrook, and Ellsworth in McLean County. It consists of 240 operating wind turbines. Each wind turbine stands 280 ft (80 m) tall and has three 120-foot-long (39 m) blades. The wind farm was constructed from 2007 to February 2008. Twin Groves was the largest utility-scale wind farm east of the Mississippi River upon completion.

== Description ==
The Twin Groves Wind Farm lies in eastern McLean County just east of Bloomington on Illinois State Route 9. The wind farm consists of 240 Vestas 1.65 MW wind turbines and is owned and operated by EDP Renewables North America. Total cost of Twin Groves was approximately $700 million. The towers are spread out over 22,000 acres (8,900 ha) of McLean County, near the villages of Arrowsmith, Ellsworth, and Saybrook. The current total capacity at Twin Groves Wind Farm is 398 megawatts. The site produces enough power to power about 120,000 homes, or approximately 1.3 billion kilowatt hours annually.

== Revenue ==
Between 150–200 acres (60.7–80.9 ha), or 1%, of the total 22,000 acres will be taken up by the turbines. Royalties are paid to owners of the land at $5,000 per wind turbine. The wind farm pays property taxes, of which Ridgeview School District will start collecting $300,000 a year, while Tri-Valley School District will collect between $200,000-$250,000 a year.

== Future ==
With 240 wind turbines already generating power, the project owner is considering an additional 170 wind turbines, to bring the total number of turbines to 410. Test wind turbines are being placed in eastern McLean County to determine if additional wind turbines can be supported. If constructed, power capacity estimates for the wind farm increase from 396 megawatts to 680 megawatts.

== Electricity production ==
Twin Groves Wind Farm Electricity Generation (MW·h)
Year	Twin Groves I High Trail Wind Farm (198 MW)	Twin Groves II Old Trail Wind Farm (198 MW)	Total Annual MW·h
2007	324,962	-	324,962
2008	635,776	579,235	1,215,011
2009	570,571	579,853	1,150,424
2010	549,674	565,168	1,114,842
2011	590,569	598,433	1,189,002
2012	589,634	604,896	1,194,530
2013	579,021	588,592	1,167,613
2014	582,524	585,864	1,168,388
2015	592,258	604,310	1,196,568
2016	541,774	565,513	1,107,287
2017	586,815	616,625	1,203,440
2018	527,035	553,138	1,080,173
Average Annual Production (years 2008–2018) --->			1,162,480
Average Capacity Factor (years 2008–2018) --->			33.5%

== See also ==
- List of wind farms
- Wind power in the United States
