= Index of Illinois-related articles =

The location of the state of Illinois in the United States of America

The following is an alphabetical list of articles related to the U.S. state of Illinois.

== 0–9 ==
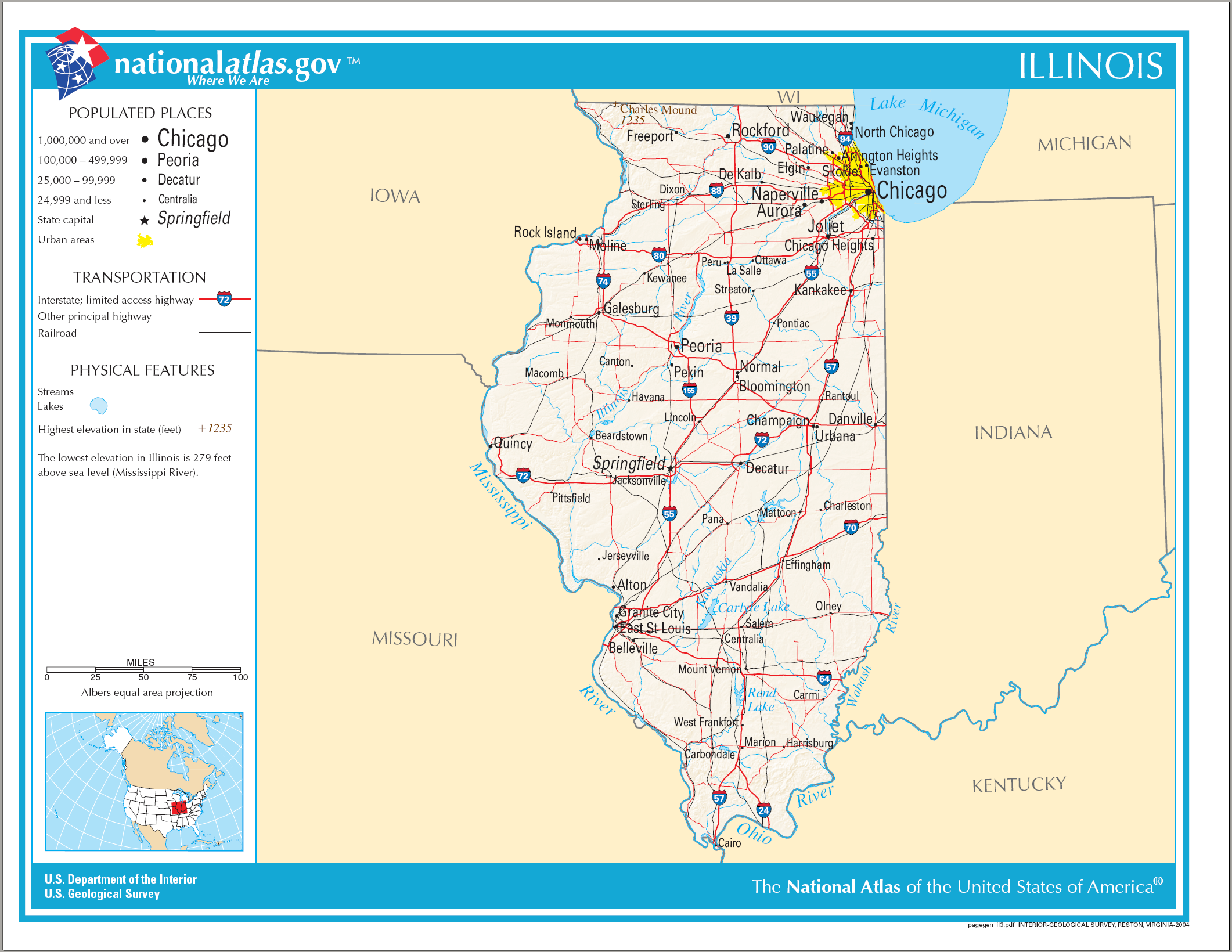
An enlargeable map of the state of Illinois

- .il.us – Internet second-level domain for the state of Illinois
- 21st state to join the United States of America

== A ==
- Abortion in Illinois
- Adjacent states
  - Indiana
  - Iowa
  - Kentucky
  - Michigan
  - Missouri
  - Wisconsin
- Airports in Illinois
- Amusement parks in Illinois
- Aquaria in Illinois
  - commons:Category:Aquaria in Illinois
- Arboreta in Illinois
  - commons:Category:Arboreta in Illinois
- Archaeological sites in Illinois
  - commons:Category:Archaeological sites in Illinois
- Area codes in Illinois
- Art museums and galleries in Illinois
  - commons:Category:Art museums and galleries in Illinois
- Astronomical observatories in Illinois
  - commons:Category:Astronomical observatories in Illinois
- Attorney General of the State of Illinois

== B ==
- Beaches of Illinois
  - commons:Category:Beaches of Illinois
- Biflex Products Corporation
- Big bluestem
- Bluegill
- Blueprint for Disaster: The Unraveling of Chicago Public Housing
- Botanical gardens in Illinois
  - commons:Category:Botanical gardens in Illinois
- Breweries in Illinois
- Buildings in Illinois
  - commons:Category:Buildings in Chicago
  - commons:Category:Buildings in Illinois

== C ==
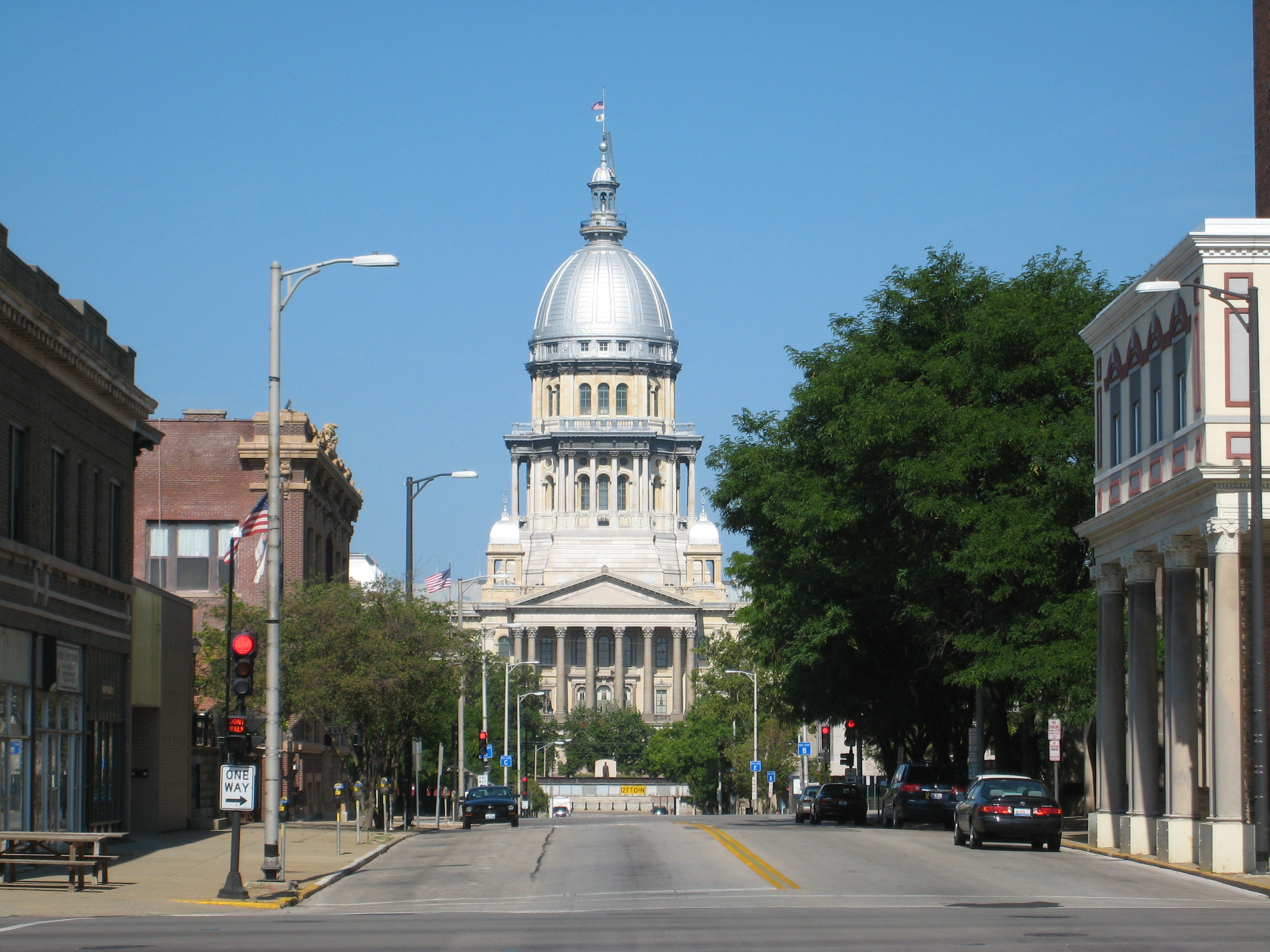
The Illinois State Capitol in Springfield

- Capitol of the State of Illinois
  - commons:Category:Illinois State Capitol
- Cardinal
- Casinos in Illinois
- Caves of Illinois
  - commons:Category:Caves of Illinois
- Census statistical areas of Illinois
- Center for Labor and Community Research
- Chicago
- Chicago Intellectual Property Alliance
- Chicago metropolitan area
- Cities in Illinois
  - commons:Category:Cities in Illinois

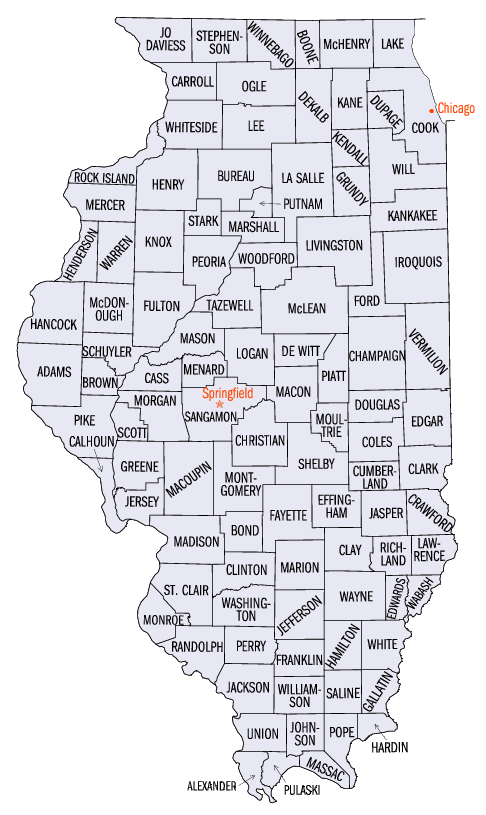
An enlargeable map of the 102 counties of the state of Illinois

- Climate of Illinois
  - Category:Climate of Illinois
    - commons:Category:Climate of Illinois
- Climate change in Illinois
- Coles Together
- Colleges and universities in Illinois
  - commons:Category:Universities and colleges in Illinois
- Communications in Illinois
  - commons:Category:Communications in Illinois
- Companies in Illinois
  - Category:Companies based in Illinois
- Congressional districts of Illinois
- Constitution of the State of Illinois
- Convention centers in Illinois
  - commons:Category:Convention centers in Illinois
- The 102 counties of the state of Illinois
  - commons:Category:Counties in Illinois
- Culture of Illinois
  - commons:Category:Illinois culture
- Crime in Illinois

== D ==
- Demographics of Chicago
- Demographics of Illinois
  - Category:Demographics of Illinois
- Dunn Fellowship

== E ==
- Economy of Illinois
  - Category:Economy of Illinois
    - commons:Category:Economy of Illinois
- Education in Illinois
  - Category:Education in Illinois
    - commons:Category:Education in Illinois
- Category:Elections in Illinois
  - commons:Category:Elections in Illinois
- Environment of Illinois
  - commons:Category:Environment of Illinois

== F ==
The Flag of the State of Illinois

- Festivals in Illinois
  - commons:Category:Festivals in Illinois
- Flag of the State of Illinois
- Fluorite
- Forts in Illinois
  - Category:Forts in Illinois
    - commons:Category:Forts in Illinois

== G ==
The Great Seal of the State of Illinois

- Geography of Illinois
  - Category:Geography of Illinois
    - commons:Category:Geography of Illinois
- Geology of Illinois
  - Category:Geology of Illinois
    - commons:Category:Geology of Illinois
- Ghost towns in Illinois
  - Category:Ghost towns in Illinois
    - commons:Category:Ghost towns in Illinois
- Golf clubs and courses in Illinois
- Government of the State of Illinois website
  - Category:Government of Illinois
    - commons:Category:Government of Illinois
- Governor of the State of Illinois
  - List of governors of Illinois
- Great Seal of the State of Illinois
- Gun laws in Illinois

== H ==
- Heritage railroads in Illinois
  - commons:Category:Heritage railroads in Illinois
- High schools of Illinois
- Higher education in Illinois
- Highway routes in Illinois
- Hiking trails in Illinois
  - commons:Category:Hiking trails in Illinois
- History of Illinois
  - Outline of Illinois history
    - Category:History of Illinois
      - commons:Category:History of Illinois
- Hospitals in Illinois
- Houlihan Smith & Company
- House of Representatives of the State of Illinois

== I ==
- IL – United States Postal Service postal code for the state of Illinois
- Illinois website
  - Category:Illinois
    - commons:Category:Illinois
      - commons:Category:Maps of Illinois
- Illinois Clean Jobs Bill
- Illinois Fair Tax
- Illinois Hispanic Chamber of Commerce
- Illinois Library Records Confidentiality Act
- Illinois Northern Railroad
- Illinois River
- Illinois Section American Water Works Association
- Illinois Soil Nitrogen Test
- Illinois State Capitol
- Illinois State Police
- Illinois Structural Health Monitoring Project
- Illinois Trade Association
- Illinois wiretapping law
- Images of Illinois
  - commons:Category:Illinois
- Islands in Illinois

== K ==
- Kabalas, band from the Quad Cities
- Kaskaskia, Illinois, first territorial and state capital 1809-1820

== L ==
- Lakes in Illinois
  - Lake Michigan
  - Category:Lakes of Illinois
    - commons:Category:Lakes of Illinois
- Landmarks in Illinois
  - commons:Category:Landmarks in Illinois
- Law of Illinois
- Lieutenant Governor of the State of Illinois
- Lists related to the state of Illinois:
  - List of airports in Illinois
  - List of breweries in Illinois
  - List of census-designated places in Illinois
  - List of census statistical areas in Illinois
  - List of cities in Illinois
  - List of colleges and universities in Illinois
  - List of companies in Illinois
  - List of United States congressional districts in Illinois
  - List of counties in Illinois
  - List of dams and reservoirs in Illinois
  - List of forts in Illinois
  - List of ghost towns in Illinois
  - List of governors of Illinois
  - List of high schools in Illinois
  - List of highway routes in Illinois
  - List of hospitals in Illinois
  - List of individuals executed in Illinois
  - List of islands in Illinois
  - List of lakes in Illinois
  - List of law enforcement agencies in Illinois
  - List of lieutenant governors of Illinois
  - List of United States military bases in Illinois
  - List of museums in Illinois
  - List of National Historic Landmarks in Illinois
  - List of newspapers in Illinois
  - List of people from Illinois
  - List of power stations in Illinois
  - List of precincts in Illinois
  - List of professional sports teams in Illinois
  - List of radio stations in Illinois
  - List of railroads in Illinois
  - National Register of Historic Places listings in Illinois
  - List of rivers of Illinois
  - List of school districts in Illinois
  - List of state forests in Illinois
  - List of state parks in Illinois
  - List of state prisons in Illinois
  - List of symbols of the State of Illinois
  - List of telephone area codes in Illinois
  - List of songs about Chicago
  - List of television stations in Illinois
  - List of Illinois's congressional delegations
  - List of United States congressional districts in Illinois
  - List of United States representatives from Illinois
  - List of United States senators from Illinois
  - List of watersheds in Illinois

== M ==
- Maps of Illinois
  - commons:Category:Maps of Illinois
- Mass media in Illinois
- Mississippi River
- Monarch butterfly
- Monuments and memorials in Illinois
  - commons:Category:Monuments and memorials in Illinois
- Museums in Illinois
  - Category:Museums in Illinois
    - commons:Category:Museums in Illinois
- Music of Illinois
  - commons:Category:Music of Illinois
  - Category:Musical groups from Illinois
  - Category:Musicians from Illinois

== N ==
- National forests of Illinois
  - commons:Category:National Forests of Illinois
- Natural gas pipelines in Illinois
- Natural history of Illinois
  - commons:Category:Natural history of Illinois
- Nature centers in Illinois
  - commons:Category:Nature centers in Illinois
- Newspapers of Illinois
- Northern Illinois Bluegrass Association
- Northern Illinois Fire Sprinkler Advisory Board
- Northwest Territory, (1787–1800)-1803

== O ==
- Ohio River
- Outdoor sculptures in Illinois
  - commons:Category:Outdoor sculptures in Illinois

== P ==
- People from Illinois
  - Category:People from Illinois
    - commons:Category:People from Illinois
    - Category:People from Illinois by populated place
    - Category:People from Illinois by county
    - Category:People from Illinois by occupation
- Politics of Illinois
  - Category:Politics of Illinois
    - commons:Category:Politics of Illinois
- Professional sports teams in Illinois
- Protected areas of Illinois
  - commons:Category:Protected areas of Illinois

== Q ==
- Quad Cities

== R ==
- Radio stations in Illinois
- Railroad museums in Illinois
  - commons:Category:Railroad museums in Illinois
- Railroads in Illinois
- National Register of Historic Places listings in Illinois
  - commons:Category:Registered Historic Places in Illinois
- Religion in Illinois
  - Category:Religion in Illinois
    - commons:Category:Religion in Illinois
- List of rivers of Illinois
  - commons:Category:Rivers of Illinois
- Roller coasters in Illinois
  - commons:Category:Roller coasters in Illinois

== S ==
- School districts of Illinois
- Scouting in Illinois
- Senate of the State of Illinois
- Settlements in Illinois
  - Cities in Illinois
  - Towns in Illinois
  - Villages in Illinois
  - Townships in Illinois
  - Census Designated Places in Illinois
  - Other unincorporated communities in Illinois
  - List of ghost towns in Illinois
- Solar power in Illinois
- Springfield, Illinois, state capital since 1839
- Sports in Illinois
  - Category:Sports in Illinois
    - commons:Category:Sports in Illinois
  - Category:Sports venues in Illinois
    - commons:Category:Sports venues in Illinois
- State Capitol of Illinois
- State of Illinois website
  - Constitution of the State of Illinois
  - Government of the State of Illinois
    - Category:Government of Illinois
      - commons:Category:Government of Illinois
  - Executive branch of the government of the State of Illinois
    - Governor of the State of Illinois
  - Legislative branch of the government of the State of Illinois
    - Legislature of the State of Illinois
      - Senate of the State of Illinois
      - House of Representatives of the State of Illinois
  - Judicial branch of the government of the State of Illinois
    - Supreme Court of Illinois
- State parks of Illinois
  - commons:Category:State parks of Illinois
- State Police of Illinois
- State prisons of Illinois
- Structures in Illinois
  - commons:Category: Buildings and structures in Illinois
- Sucker State, an old nickname for Illinois
- Supreme Court of Illinois
- Symbols of the State of Illinois
  - Category:Symbols of Illinois
    - commons:Category:Symbols of Illinois

== T ==
- Telecommunications in Illinois
  - commons:Category:Communications in Illinois
- Telephone area codes in Illinois
- Television shows set in Illinois
- Television stations in Illinois
- Territory Northwest of the River Ohio, (1787–1800)-1803
- Illinois Territory, 1809–1818
- Indiana Territory, (1800–1809)-1816
- Theatres in Illinois
  - commons:Category:Theatres in Illinois
- Tourism in Illinois website
  - commons:Category:Tourism in Illinois
- Transportation in Illinois
  - Category:Transportation in Illinois
    - commons:Category:Transport in Illinois
- Illinois Treasurer
- Tullimonstrum gregarium

== U ==
- United States of America
  - States of the United States of America
  - United States census statistical areas of Illinois
  - Illinois's congressional delegations
  - United States congressional districts in Illinois
  - United States Court of Appeals for the Seventh Circuit
  - United States District Court for the Central District of Illinois
  - United States District Court for the Northern District of Illinois
  - United States District Court for the Southern District of Illinois
  - United States representatives from Illinois
  - United States senators from Illinois
- Universities and colleges in Illinois
  - commons:Category:Universities and colleges in Illinois
- US-IL – ISO 3166-2:US region code for the State of Illinois
- USS Illinois (BB-7)

== V ==
- Vandalia, Illinois, state capital 1820-1839
- Viola sororia

== W ==
- War Lords
- Water parks in Illinois
- Watersheds in Illinois
- White oak
- White-tailed deer
- Wikimedia Foundation
  - Wikimedia Commons:Category:Illinois
    - commons:Category:Maps of Illinois
  - Wikinews:Category:Illinois
    - Wikinews:Portal:Illinois
  - Wikipedia Category:Illinois
    - Wikipedia Portal:Illinois
    - Wikipedia:WikiProject Illinois
      - Category:WikiProject Illinois articles
      - Wikipedia:WikiProject Illinois/Participants
- Wind power in Illinois

== Z ==
- Zoos in Illinois
  - commons:Category:Zoos in Illinois

== See also ==
- Topic overview:
  - Illinois
  - Outline of Illinois
