= Outline of Illinois =

U.S. state

The flag of Illinois

The seal of Illinois

The location of the state of Illinois in the United States of America

The following outline is provided as an overview of and topical guide to the U.S. state of Illinois:

Illinois – fifth most populous of the 50 states of the United States of America. Illinois lies between Lake Michigan and the Mississippi River and the Ohio River in the Midwestern United States. Chicago, Illinois, is the third most populous city and the third most populous metropolitan area of the United States. The United States created the Illinois Territory on March 1, 1809. Illinois joined the Union as the 21st state on December 3, 1818.

== General reference ==
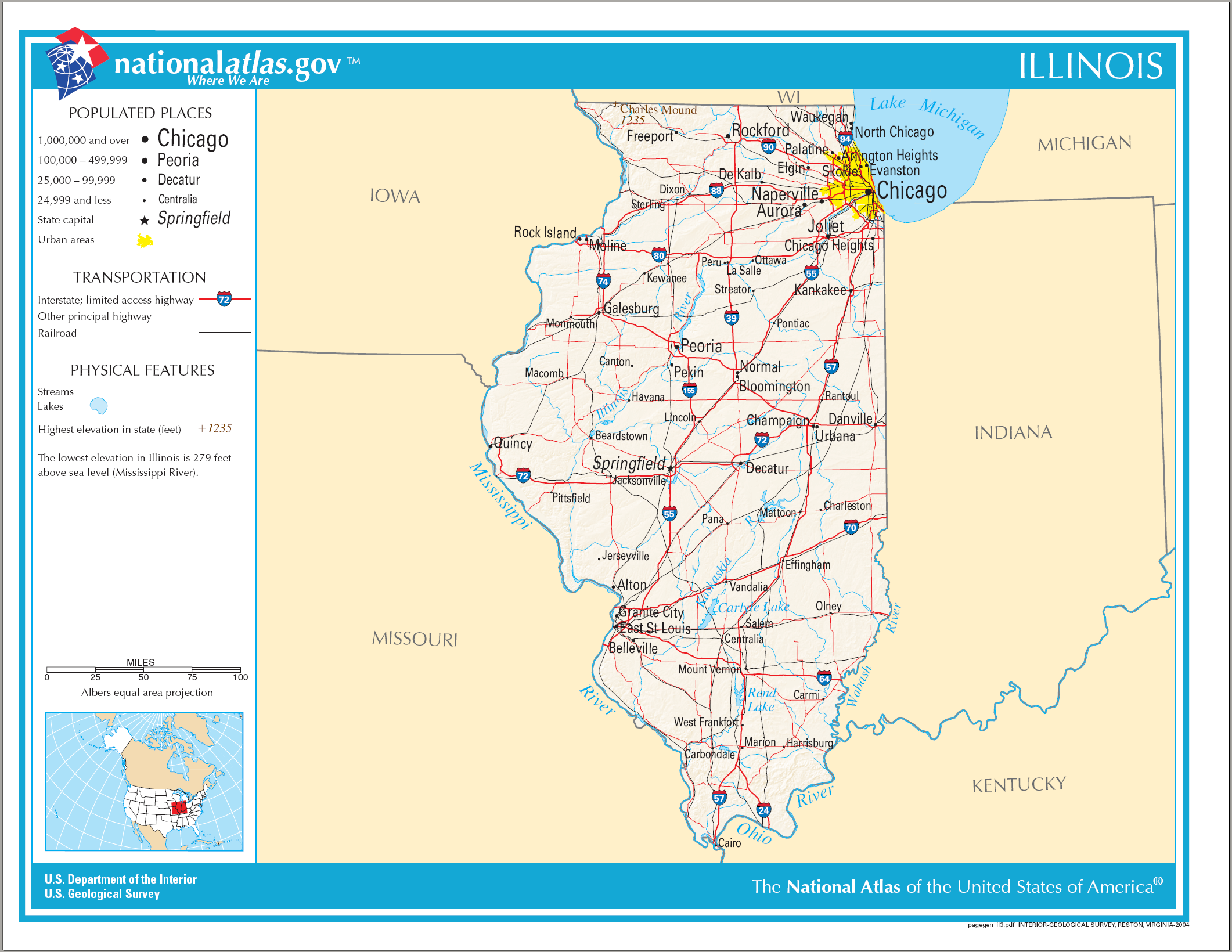
An enlargeable map of the state of Illinois

- Names
  - Common name: Illinois
    - Pronunciation: /ˌɪlɪˈnɔɪ/ IL-i-NOY
  - Official name: State of Illinois
  - Abbreviations and name codes
    - Postal symbol: IL
    - ISO 3166-2 code: US-IL
    - Internet second-level domain: .il.us
  - Nicknames
    - Land of Lincoln (currently used on license plates)
    - Prairie State
    - Corn State
    - Inland Empire State
    - Sucker State (possibly named for a type of fish)
    - Garden of the West
    - Baja Wisconsin
- Adjectival: Illinois
- Demonym: Illinoisan

== Geography of Illinois ==
Geography of Illinois

- Illinois is: a U.S. state, a federal state of the United States of America
- Location
  - Northern Hemisphere
  - Western Hemisphere
    - Americas
      - North America
        - Anglo America
        - Northern America
          - United States of America
            - Contiguous United States
              - Central United States
                - Corn Belt
                - East North Central States
              - Midwestern United States
          - Great Lakes Region
- Population of Illinois: 12,830,632 (2010 U.S. Census)
- Area of Illinois: 57,918 square miles (150,010 km^{2}), 25th of the 50 states.
- Atlas of Illinois

=== Places in Illinois ===
- Historic places in Illinois
  - Ghost towns in Illinois
  - National Historic Landmarks in Illinois
  - National Register of Historic Places listings in Illinois
    - Bridges on the National Register of Historic Places in Illinois
- National Natural Landmarks in Illinois
- National parks in Illinois
- State parks in Illinois

=== Environment of Illinois ===
- Climate of Illinois
- Geology of Illinois
- Environment ecoregions of Illinois
- Protected areas in Illinois
  - Nature centers in Illinois
  - State forests of Illinois
- Superfund sites in Illinois
- Wildlife of Illinois
  - Fauna of Illinois
    - Birds of Illinois

==== Natural geographic features of Illinois ====
- Lakes of Illinois
- Rivers of Illinois

=== Regions of Illinois ===
Regions of Illinois

- Central Illinois
- Eastern Illinois
- Northern Illinois
  - Northwestern Illinois
- Southern Illinois
  - Southeastern Illinois
- Forgottonia (Western Illinois)

==== Administrative divisions of Illinois ====
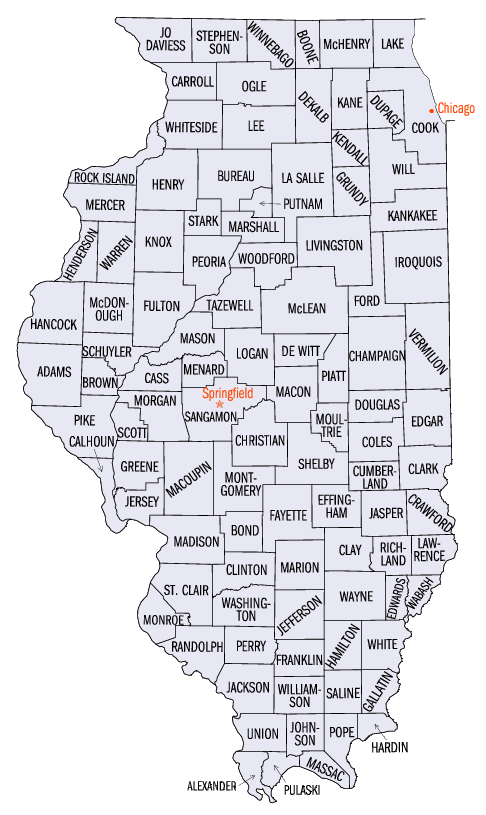
An enlargeable map of the 102 counties of the state of Illinois

- The 102 counties of the state of Illinois
  - Municipalities in Illinois
    - Cities in Illinois
      - State capital of Illinois:
      - City nicknames in Illinois
    - Towns in Illinois
    - Unincorporated communities in Illinois
  - Census-designated places in Illinois

=== Demography of Illinois ===
Demographics of Illinois

== Government and politics of Illinois ==
Politics of Illinois

- Form of government: U.S. state government
- Illinois's congressional delegations
- Illinois State Capitol
- Elections in Illinois
  - Electoral reform in Illinois
- Political party strength in Illinois

=== Branches of the government of Illinois ===
Government of Illinois

==== Executive branch of the government of Illinois ====
- Governor of Illinois
  - Lieutenant Governor of Illinois
  - Illinois Secretary of State
  - Illinois Treasurer
- State departments
  - Illinois Department of Transportation

==== Legislative branch of the government of Illinois ====
- Illinois General Assembly (bicameral)
  - Upper house: Illinois Senate
  - Lower house: Illinois House of Representatives

==== Judicial branch of the government of Illinois ====
Courts of Illinois

- Supreme Court of Illinois

=== Law and order in Illinois ===
Law of Illinois

- Cannabis in Illinois
- Capital punishment in Illinois
  - Individuals executed in Illinois
- Illinois Constitution
- Crime in Illinois
- Gun laws in Illinois
- Law enforcement in Illinois
  - Law enforcement agencies in Illinois
    - Illinois State Police
- Same-sex marriage in Illinois

=== Military in Illinois ===
- Illinois Air National Guard
- Illinois Army National Guard
- List of United States military bases in Illinois

== History of Illinois ==
History of Illinois

=== History of Illinois, by period ===
The location of the state of Illinois in the United States of America

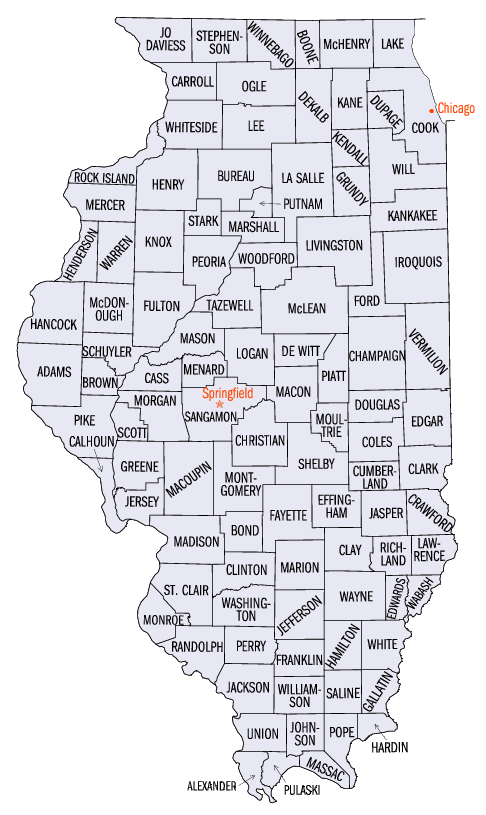
An enlargeable map of the 102 counties of the state of Illinois

- Prehistory of Illinois
  - Indigenous peoples
    - Mississippian culture
      - Cahokia
- French colony of Louisiane, 1699–1763; Upper Louisiana was called Illinois Country.
  - Treaty of Paris of 1763
- British (though predominantly Francophone) Province of Quebec, (1763–1783)-1791
- American Revolutionary War, April 19, 1775 – September 3, 1783
  - United States Declaration of Independence, July 4, 1776
  - Illinois campaign, July 1778 – February 1779
  - Treaty of Paris, September 3, 1783
  - Unorganized territory of the United States, 1783–1787
- Territory Northwest of the River Ohio, (1787–1800)-1803
- Territory of Indiana, (1800–1809)-1816
- Territory of Illinois, 1809–1818
  - Peoria War, 1813
- State of Illinois becomes 21st State admitted to the United States of America on December 3, 1818
  - Black Hawk War, 1832
  - Abraham Lincoln becomes 16th President of the United States on March 4, 1861
  - American Civil War, April 12, 1861 – May 13, 1865
    - Illinois in the American Civil War
    - Assassination of President Abraham Lincoln in Washington, D.C., on April 14, 1865
      - President Lincoln dies in Washington, D.C., on April 15, 1865
  - Ulysses S. Grant becomes 18th President of the United States on March 4, 1869
  - Ronald Reagan becomes 40th President of the United States on January 20, 1981

=== History of Illinois, by region ===
- By city
  - History of Chicago
  - History of Nauvoo, Illinois
  - History of Peoria, Illinois

=== History of Illinois, by subject ===
- List of Illinois state legislatures
- Museums in Illinois

== Culture of Illinois ==
Culture of Illinois

- Museums in Illinois
- Religion in Illinois
  - Episcopal Diocese of Chicago
- Scouting in Illinois
- List of Illinois state symbols
  - Flag of Illinois
  - Seal of Illinois

=== The Arts in Illinois ===
- Music of Illinois
- Theater in Illinois

=== Sports in Illinois ===
Sports in Illinois

- Professional sports teams in Illinois

== Economy and infrastructure of Illinois ==
Economy of Illinois

- Communications in Illinois
  - Newspapers in Illinois
  - Radio stations in Illinois
  - Television stations in Illinois
- Energy in Illinois
  - Power stations in Illinois
  - Solar power in Illinois
  - Wind power in Illinois
- Health care in Illinois
  - Hospitals in Illinois
- Transportation in Illinois
  - Airports in Illinois
  - Railroads in Illinois
  - Roads in Illinois
    - Illinois Routes (State highways)
    - Interstate Highways in Illinois

== Education in Illinois ==
Education in Illinois

- Schools in Illinois
  - School districts in Illinois
    - High schools in Illinois
  - Colleges and universities in Illinois
    - University of Illinois system
    - Illinois State University

== See also ==
- Topic overview:
  - Illinois
  - Index of Illinois-related articles
