= HFSC =

HFSC may refer to:

- Hierarchical fair-service curve, a network scheduling algorithm for a network scheduler
- Home Fire Sprinkler Coalition, an organization promoting use of home sprinklers for fire prevention
- United States House Committee on Financial Services, of the United States House of Representatives
