= ISNT =

ISNT may refer to:

- Illinois Soil Nitrogen Test (ISNT), a method for measuring nitrogen in soil
- In situ nick translation (ISNT), a test used in semen analysis
- Indian Society for Non-destructive Testing (ISNT), a society in India for nondestructive testing
