= Languages of Illinois =

The official language of Illinois is English. Nearly 80% of the population speak English natively, and most others speak it fluently as a second language. The forms of American English spoken in Illinois range from Inland Northern near Chicago and the northern part of the state, to Midland and Southern dialects further downstate. Illinois has speakers of many other languages, of which Spanish is by far the most widespread. Illinois's indigenous languages disappeared when the Indian population was deported under the policy of Indian Removal.

== Official language ==
English is Illinois's official language. Illinois was one of the first states in the United States to pass an official language law, though its first official language was not English but "American". In 1923, Representative Washington J. McCormick of Montana had failed to pass a bill in the United States Congress declaring "American" to be the official language of the United States. Following the bill's failure, Senator Frank Ryan introduced a similar bill to the Illinois General Assembly. The bill passed with the support of Irish and Jewish politicians in Chicago, who, by rejecting the term "English", wanted to show their opposition to British policies in Ireland and Palestine, respectively. In 1969, another act of the General Assembly replaced "American" with "English." Meanwhile, the term "American language" survives in some legislation from the period. Unlike official language laws in many other states, the statute in Illinois is purely symbolic, having the same status as laws naming state symbols like the state bird and state fossil.

== Dialects of English ==
The English of Illinois varies from Inland Northern in the northern part of the state, to Midland and Southern further south. The Northern Cities Vowel Shift is advanced in Chicago and its vicinity, and some features of the shift can be heard along The St. Louis Corridor, a southwestern extension of the NCVS stretching from the Chicago area to St. Louis. The distribution of dialect features reflects the origins of early English-speaking settlers: Inland Northern predominates in areas first settled by people from New England, New York, Pennsylvania, and Germany; Midland and Southern are spoken in areas settled by people from the southern United States. African American Vernacular English is also spoken in parts of the state.

== Other languages ==
As of 2010, 78.26% (9,315,206) of Illinois residents age 5 and older spoke English at home as a primary language, while 12.74% (1,516,674) spoke Spanish, 1.64% (195,600) Polish, 0.67% (80,954) Chinese (which includes Cantonese and Mandarin), and 0.64% (75,754) Tagalog. In total, 21.74% (2,587,254) of Illinois's population age 5 and older spoke a mother language other than English. Among those who speak a language other than English at home, most (57.3%) reported in 2010 that they also speak English "very well." 20.7% spoke English "well," 15.9% spoke it "not well," and only 6.2% "not at all".

Top 10 Non-English Languages Spoken in Illinois
Language	Percentage of population (as of 2010)
Spanish	12.74%
Polish	1.64%
Chinese (including Cantonese and Mandarin)	0.67%
Tagalog	0.65%
German and Korean (tied)	0.45%
Arabic	0.38%
Urdu and Russian (tied)	0.35%
Italian	0.34%
Gujarati	0.32%
Greek and Hindi (tied)	0.30%

In the colonial period, the Miami-Illinois language was spoken throughout the territory of the modern state. Jacques Gravier, a missionary at Starved Rock, wrote the first French-Illinois dictionary in 1700; Jean Le Boullenger wrote another in 1725. Other indigenous languages at the time of statehood in 1818 included Potawatomi, Sauk-Fox, and Ojibwe. These languages disappeared from Illinois when the U.S. carried out Indian Removal, culminating in the Black Hawk War of 1832 and the 1833 Treaty of Chicago.

French was the language of colonial Illinois before 1763, and under British rule remained the most-spoken language in the main settlements of Cahokia and Kaskaskia. Many French speakers left Illinois after it came under U.S. control following the Illinois Campaign of 1778, but Illinois was still a bilingual territory for several more years before the flood of Anglo-American settlers overwhelmed the old communities. By the time of statehood in 1818, French was in decline for matters of politics and government. Colonial French died out in Illinois but survived as Missouri French in some communities across the Mississippi River. The 2010 census reported 34,938 French speakers in Illinois, 0.29% of the population.
