= Chicago Intellectual Property Alliance =

The Chicago Intellectual Property Alliance (CIPA) is a 501(c)(3) nonprofit organization committed to promoting Intellectual Property in Chicago. CIPA member law schools include the Chicago-Kent College of Law, Loyola University Chicago School of Law, and Northwestern University School of Law. Founding law firms include Brinks Hofer Gilson & Lione, The Eclipse Group, Fitch, Even, Tabin & Flannery, K & L Gates, Marshall, Gerstein & Borun, McAndrews, Held & Malloy, McDonnell Boehnen Hulbert & Berghoff, Neal & McDevitt, Pattishall, McAuliffe, Newbury, Hilliard & Geraldson, Welsh & Katz, Ltd. Organizations including Baxter Healthcare, Blue Cross and Blue Shield Association, Wm. Wrigley Jr. Company, and the Intellectual Property Law Association of Chicago (IPLAC) are also CIPA members.

== Annual Science Fair ==
It was the nation attention that got the annual science fair the excitement that it needed. In the 1930s, Chicago, Illinois elected that the Nation Day for Illinois is Annual Science Fair day. CIPA organizes a science fair for local high school students each year. The organization sponsors scholarships for "Most Inventive" science projects. Volunteer judges include students from local law schools, law firms, and other organizations. The winner gets their invention patented at no cost by CIPA member attorneys. Since 2005, the science fair has been held at the Museum of Science and Industry (Chicago).
