= Ron Hazelton =

American television presenter (1942–2023)

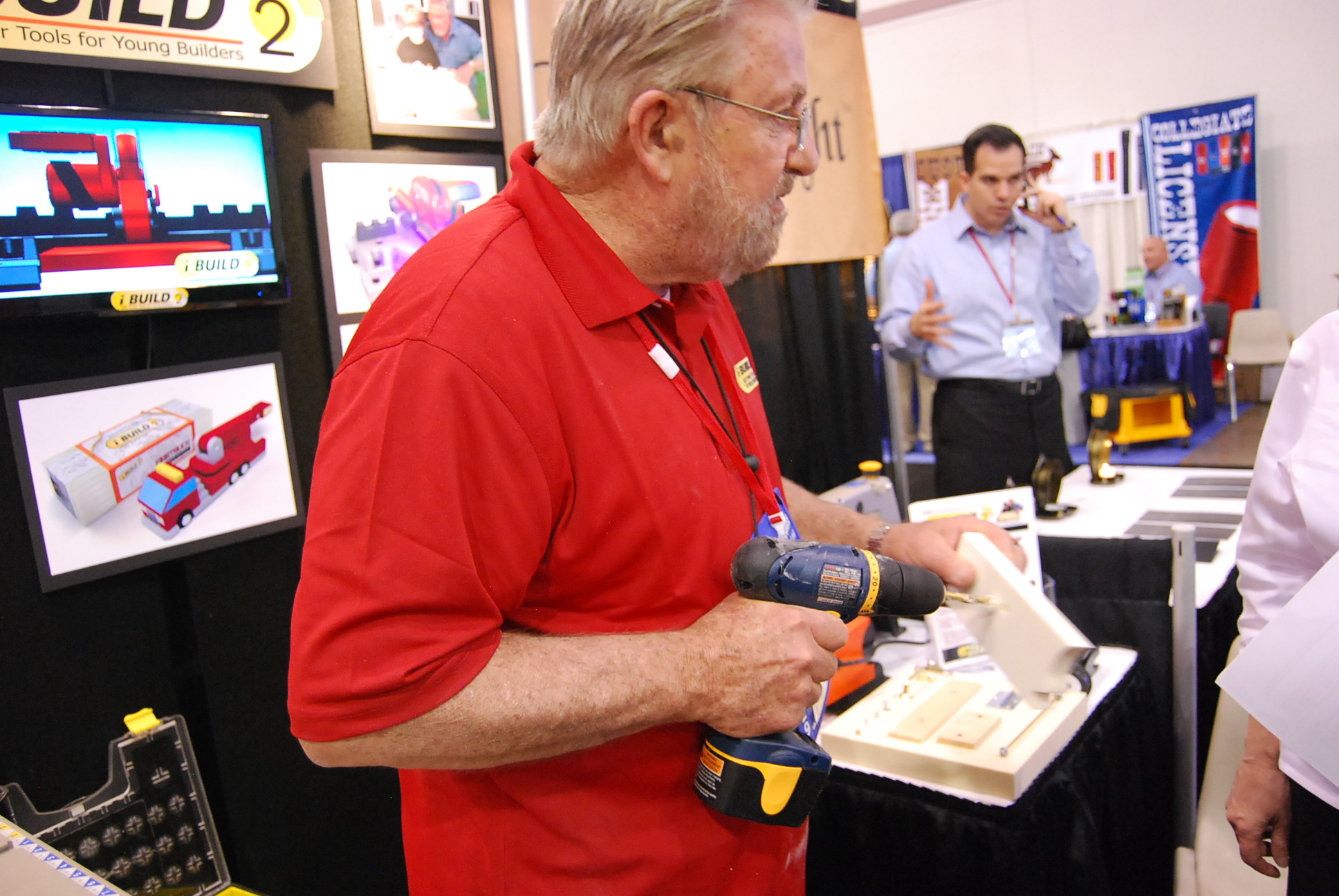
Hazelton in 2010

Ron Hazelton (March 29, 1942 – April 30, 2023) was an American television presenter. He was the host of several popular home improvement series including Ron Hazelton's HouseCalls. He was also the Home Improvement Editor for ABC's Good Morning America and hosted several shows for The History Channel.

== Early life ==
Hazelton was born March 29, 1942, in Binghamton, New York, to Earl, a building contractor, and Wanda Hazelton. He graduated from the Florida State University College of Business with a BS in marketing in 1965. He was a member of the Pi Kappa Alpha fraternity and was part of the Air Force ROTC Drill team.

== Early career ==
After graduation, Hazelton joined US Navy Officer Candidate School for Anti-Submarine Warfare School. Hazelton was a marketing consultant in Boston. He founded a storefront restoration workshop in San Francisco called Cow Hollow Woodworks in 1978. He sold the business in 1993.

== Television career ==
In 1989, Hazelton created, co-produced, and hosted a reality-based, on-location home improvement television program called The House Doctor. It ran from 1990 to 1997 with more than 200 episodes and 600 house visits. It originated on ABC affiliate KGO-TV in San Francisco, and aired for several years on the HGTV network until 2001. He related that he got started on television by accident: his dentist connected him with a KGO-TV producer for what became The House Doctor.

Hazelton was the Home Improvement Editor for ABC's Good Morning America from 1997 to 2007. Ron reported regularly on a variety of topics related to home improvement, design, repair, health, and safety. He has been featured as a home improvement expert on The Oprah Winfrey Show, Inside Edition, Discovery Channel's Popular Mechanics, Lifetime's Our Home and The History Channel's series Modern Marvels — History of Tools, Hands on History and Save our History: Frontier Homes.

Ron Hazelton's HouseCalls is a 30-minute Tribune Entertainment nationally syndicated home improvement show that Hazelton produced and hosted. He traveled by motor home with a mobile workshop to help people with weekend DIY home projects. As of May 2023, Ron Hazelton's HouseCalls is broadcasting season 24.

HouseCalls is a new syndicated version of the program featuring a new logo (stylized "HouseCalls") mixing vintage clips of Ron with new clips featuring host Brian Kelsey and is syndicated by The Television Syndication Company, Inc. (TVS) on a barter basis. The new programs have a copyright date of 2026.

== Advocacy ==
Hazelton was the national spokesperson for the Home Fire Sprinkler Coalition, a non-profit, fire safety organization, from 1997. He received a special Appreciation Award from Home Fire Sprinkler Coalition Steering Committee member, the National Fire Sprinkler Association, for his work on behalf of the organization.

== Author ==
Hazelton was the author of:

- Ron Hazelton's HouseCalls: America's Most Requested Home Improvement Projects (1999, Time-Life Books)
- Plumbing Made Easy (2009, F+W Publications’ Home Basics series)
- Electrical Made Easy (2009, F+W Publications’ Home Basics series)

== Personal life and death ==
Hazelton married Lynn Robin Drasin in October 1997. At the time of their marriage, Drasin was a segment producer on Good Morning America on ABC while Hazelton was the show's home improvement editor. Drasin later became a producer on Ron Hazelton's HouseCalls.

Hazelton died at his Connecticut home on April 30, 2023, at the age of 81.
