= Illinois (song) =

Regional anthem of the US state of Illinois

- Regional anthem of Illinois
- Lyrics: Charles H. Chamberlin, c. 1890
- Music: Archibald Johnston, 1876
- Adopted: 1925

"Illinois" is the anthem (or state song) of the U.S. state of Illinois. Written in about 1890 by Civil War veteran Charles H. Chamberlin (1891–1894), the verses were set to the tune of "Baby Mine," a popular song composed in 1876 by Archibald Johnston (died 1887). "Illinois" became the state song by an act of the 54th Illinois General Assembly in 1925.

== History ==
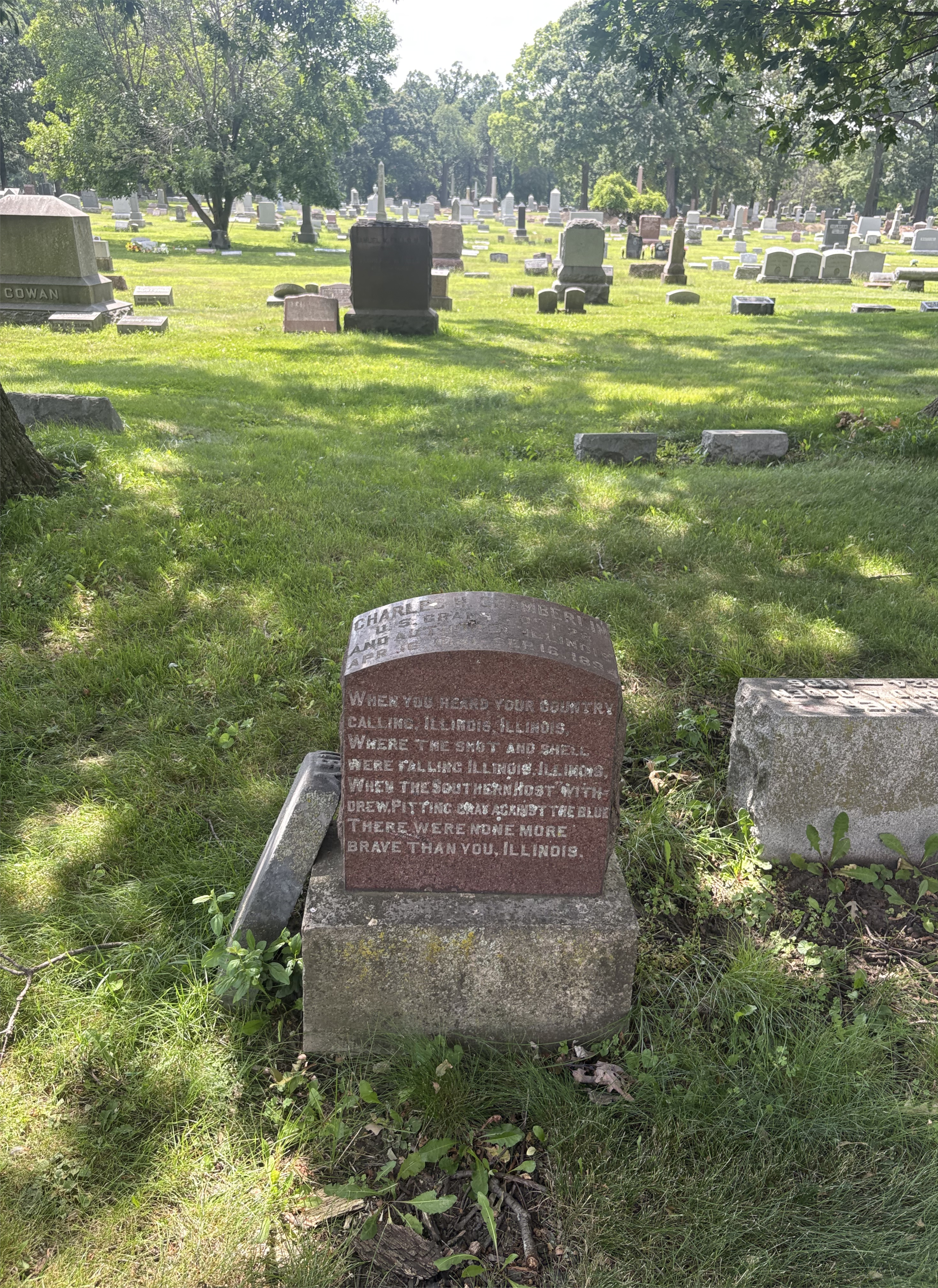
Charles H. Chamberlin's gravestone, inscribed with the lyrics, at Forest Home Cemetery

The song was written during the successful campaign, which concluded in April 1890, to have the 1893 World's Columbian Exposition located in Chicago. It was intended for Colonel O. B. Knight, a friend of Mr. Chamberlin, to sing in Illinois and Washington D.C. as support for the nomination of Illinois to host the fair.

Walter Howe Jones (died 1933), Director of the University of Illinois School of Music from 1895 to 1901, set the song lyrics to his own music for male voices in 1901. His version was published in several campus song books but was not widely used.

In 1925, Florence Fifer Bohrer (1877–1960) of Bloomington, daughter of Governor Joseph W. Fifer (1840-1938) and the first woman Illinois state senator, introduced the bill making "Illinois" with Johnston's melody the official state song. The bill was passed on June 30, 1925.

Colonel Armin F. Hand (1882?–1966) of Chicago composed a stylized version of the song titled "Governor's March (Illinois)" for marching band in 1935, and dedicated it to Governor Henry Horner (1879–1940). In 1949, the University of Illinois football band, the Marching Illini, conducted by Everett Kisinger (1912–1990) adapted this march as their pregame "Entrance No. 3" played before each home game. It was revised by James Curnow in 1972.

In addition to the original four verses of the lyrics, two more were written in 1966 by folk singer Win Stracke (1908-1991) for the 1968 Illinois Sesquicentennial. A marching band arrangement by John Warrington (1911–1978) was issued at the same time.

In 2018 the Illinois House of Representatives passed HR 184, a resolution encouraging the playing of "Illinois" at government events, commencement exercises, and other events at state universities. The resolution was drafted by Chicago author Stan "Tex" Banash and introduced by State Representative Michael P. McAuliffe.

== Lyrics ==
By thy rivers gently flowing, Illinois, Illinois,
O'er thy prairies verdant growing, Illinois, Illinois,
Comes an echo on the breeze.
Rustling through the leafy trees, and its mellow tones are these, Illinois, Illinois,
and its mellow tones are these, Illinois.

From a wilderness of prairies, Illinois, Illinois,
Straight thy way and never varies, Illinois, Illinois,
Till upon the inland sea,
Stands thy great commercial tree, turning all the world to thee, Illinois, Illinois,
Turning all the world to thee, Illinois.
Turning all the world to thee, Illinois.

When you heard your country calling, Illinois, Illinois,
Where the shot and shell were falling, Illinois, Illinois,
When the Southern host withdrew,
Pitting Gray against the Blue, there were none more brave than you, Illinois, Illinois,
There were none more brave than you, Illinois.
There were none more brave than you, Illinois.

Not without thy wondrous story, Illinois, Illinois,
Can be writ the nation's glory, Illinois, Illinois,
On the record of thy years,
Abraham Lincoln's name appears, Grant and Logan, and our tears, Illinois, Illinois,
Grant and Logan, and our tears, Illinois.
Grant and Logan, and our tears, Illinois.

The following verses were written by Win Stracke in 1966:

Eighteen-eighteen saw your founding, Illinois, Illinois,
And your progress is unbounding, Illinois, Illinois,
Pioneers once cleared the lands,
Where great industries now stand. World renown you do command, Illinois, Illinois,
World renown you do command, Illinois.
World renown you do command, Illinois.

Let us pledge in final chorus, Illinois, Illinois
That in struggles still before us, Illinois, Illinois
To our heroes we'll be true,
As their vision we pursue. In abiding love for you, Illinois, Illinois.
In abiding love for you, Illinois.
In abiding love for you, Illinois.

== See also ==
- List of Illinois state symbols
