= Electoral reform in Illinois =

U.S. state electoral reform

Electoral reform in Illinois refers to efforts, proposals and plans to change the election and voting laws in Illinois.

== Alternate voting methods ==
Cumulative voting was used in the Illinois House of Representatives from 1870 to 1980. This system elected three representatives from a district and gave each voter three votes, which could be given to candidates in any combination (3 votes for 1 candidate, 1 vote each for 3 candidates, etc.) This led to unusual combinations, such as Chicago Republicans and suburban Democrats, being elected. Some reformers favor reinstating this system.

== Ballot access ==
In Lee v. Keith, the United States Court of Appeals for the Seventh Circuit struck down Illinois' ballot access laws, opining, "In combination, the ballot access requirements for independent legislative candidates in Illinois--the early filing deadline, the 10% signature requirement, and the additional statutory restriction that disqualifies anyone who signs an independent candidate's nominating petition from voting in the primary--operate to unconstitutionally burden the freedom of political association guaranteed by the First and Fourteenth Amendments. Ballot access barriers this high--they are the most restrictive in the nation and have effectively eliminated independent legislative candidacies from the Illinois political scene for a quarter of a century--are not sustainable based on the state's asserted interest in deterring party splintering, factionalism, and frivolous candidacies".

== Allocation of electoral votes ==
In 2007, both houses of the Illinois General Assembly passed bills enacting the National Popular Vote Interstate Compact, which would award the state's 21 electoral votes to the candidate winning the nationwide popular vote. On April 7, former Governor Rod Blagojevich signed the bill, making Illinois the third state to do so.

== Governor recall ==
In 2010 an amendment was passed to give voters the ability to recall governors and hold a special election to replace them.

== Accessible voting ==
In 2021, Governor J. B. Pritzker signed a law designed to make voting more accessible in various ways. The bill made the November election day a state holiday. It also made permanent number of changes that had been implemented for the preceding 2020 elections amid the COVID-19 pandemic, including "curbside voting" and universal access to postal voting. It required counties to establish central polling locations open to voters who live in any of the county's precincts. It also empowered sheriffs to set up temporary polling places in county jails for people in custody but not convicted.
