= List of National Natural Landmarks in Illinois =

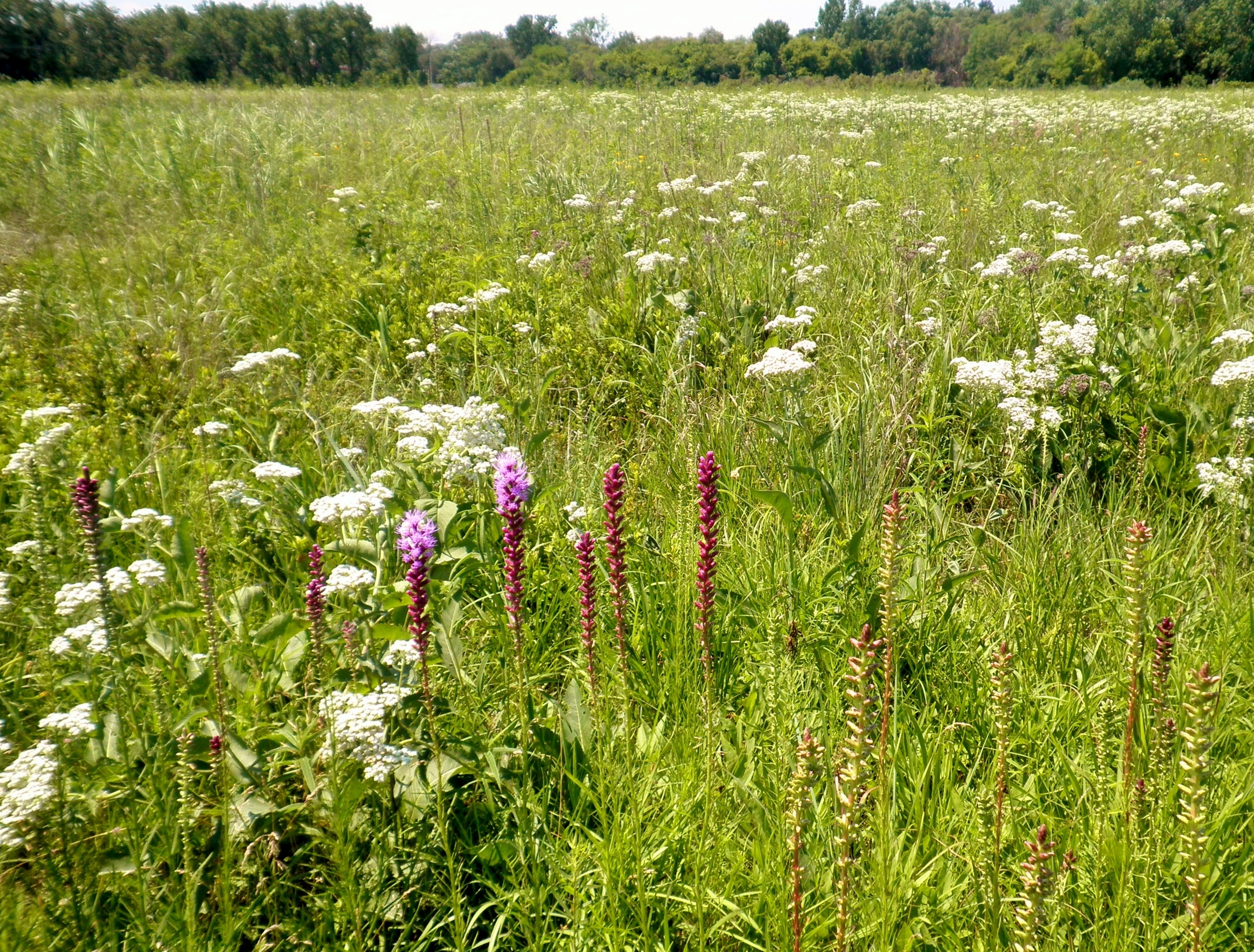
Markham Prairie, the most recently designated NNL in Illinois

The National Natural Landmarks (NNLs) in Illinois include 18 of the almost 600 such landmarks in the United States. They cover areas of geological, biological and historical importance, and include lakes, bogs, canyons and forests. Several of the sites provide habitat for rare or endangered plant and animal species. The landmarks are located in 13 of the state's 102 counties. Five counties each contain all or part of two or more NNLs, while one landmark is split between two counties. The first designation, Forest of the Wabash in southern Illinois on the Wabash River, was made in 1965, while the most recent designation, Markham Prairie in northern Illinois, was made in 1987. Natural Landmarks in Illinois range from 53 to 6,500 acres (21.4 to 2,630.5 ha; 0.1 to 10.2 sq mi) in size. Owners include private individuals or organizations, and several county, state and federal agencies.

The National Natural Landmarks Program is administered by the National Park Service, a branch of the Department of the Interior. The National Park Service determines which properties meet NNL criteria and, after notifying the owners, makes nomination recommendations. The Secretary of the Interior reviews nominations and, based on a set of predetermined criteria, makes a decision on NNL designation or a determination of eligibility for designation. Both public and privately owned properties can be designated as NNLs. Owners may object to the nomination of the property as a NNL. This designation provides indirect, partial protection of the historic integrity of the properties via tax incentives, grants, monitoring of threats, and other means.

== National Natural Landmarks ==
Illinois National Natural Landmarks (clickable map)

Name	Image	Date	Location	County	Ownership	Description
Allerton Natural Area		1970	39°59′53″N 88°39′00″W	Piatt	State	Contains a now-rare example of the ecosystems in Illinois stream valleys, with bottomland and upland forests in minimally disturbed condition. Part of Robert Allerton Park.
Bell Smith Springs		1980	37°31′7″N 88°39′22″W	Pope	Federal, private	Part of the Shawnee National Forest, Bell Smith Springs contains excellent examples of sharply dissected sandstone substrates and their associated ecosystems. Stream erosion and mass wasting have created landform examples representative of the area.
Busse Forest Nature Preserve		1980	42°02′32″N 88°00′12″W	Cook	County	Historic preserve of mesic and dry-mesic upland forest, one of the best examples in the eastern Central Lowlands bio-physiographic province. Part of the Cook County Forest Preserve District.
Forest of the Wabash	–	1965	38°21′31″N 87°49′30″W	Wabash	State	Part of Beall Woods State Park, the site includes minimally disturbed bottom- and up-land forests along the Wabash River, including a major example of the region's remaining oak-hickory forest.
Fults Hill Prairie Nature Preserve		1986	37°58′39″N 89°48′02″W	Monroe	State	Fults Hill is the region's best and least disturbed example of loess hill prairies.
Funks Grove Nature Preserve		1974	40°21′49″N 89°06′52″W	McLean	State, private	Transitional site between oak-hickory forest prevalent in the region and the western edge of the eastern mesophytic association. A now-rare example of the area's virgin forests.
Giant City Geological Area		1980	37°36′18″N 89°11′18″W	Union	State	A part of Giant City State Park, the Geological Area is characterized by joint-bound sandstone blocks of the Pennsylvanian age, with examples of gravity sliding. It also contains extensive flora, including sugar maple-dominated mesic forests and oak-hickory and xeric oak woodlands.
Heron Pond - Little Black Slough Nature Preserve		1972	37°22′01″N 88°57′00″W	Johnson	State, private	Largest remnant of cypress-tupelo swamp in the state, containing alluvial, colluvial and lacustrine sedimentation and a heron rookery.
Horseshoe Lake	Horshoe Lake	1972	37°08′56″N 089°21′18″W	Alexander	State	Home to a wide range of flora, including mature bald cypress, and fauna, including migrating waterfowl and overwintering Canada geese. Part of Horseshoe Lake State Fish and Wildlife Area.
Illinois Beach Nature Preserve		1980	42°25′02″N 87°48′42″W	Lake	State	The site is a part of Illinois Beach State Park, and contains a wide range of savanna, prairie, wetland and beach ecosystems, as well as numerous endangered species.
LaRue-Pine Hills Ecological Area		1974	37°35′N 89°25′W	Union	Federal, state, private	Part of the Shawnee National Forest, the Ecological Area provides habitat for diverse vegetation, representing plants from throughout the state, including 40 rare species.
Little Grand Canyon		1980	37°41′11″N 89°23′54″W	Jackson	Federal	A large box canyon with vertical overhanging walls, containing a wide range of ecosystems, including sandstone, oak-hickory forest and prairie. The area is known for its wide range of snakes that hibernate in its seasonal habitats. Located in Shawnee National Forest.
Lower Cache River Swamp		1980	37°04′01″N 89°10′22″W	Johnson, Pulaski	State, private	The swamp is a remnant fragment of a once-extensive ecosystem, providing habitat for large trees, including three that hold the records for the largest of their respective species.
Lusk Creek Canyon		1980	37°31′08″N 88°32′24″W	Pope	Federal, state	Part of the Shawnee National Forest, Lusk Creek Canyon was formed by stream erosion and mass wasting through lower Pennsylvanian sandstone. The site includes two major forest ecosystems and numerous endangered plant species.
Markham Prairie		1987	41°36′25″N 87°41′16″W	Cook	Federal, state, private	The largest high quality undisturbed prairie in the state and one of the largest in the area, Markham is a remaining fragment of a once-widespread ecosystem. Containing a mixture of sand prairie and tallgrass prairie, it also includes an undeveloped lakebed and beach ridges.
Mississippi Palisades		1972	42°08′18″N 90°09′32″W	Carroll	State	Contains cliffs, caves, and valleys illustrative of palisades topography, as well as extensive animal and plant habitat. Located in an eponymous state park.
Volo Bog Nature Preserve	Volo Bog	1972	42°21′06″N 88°11′10″W	Lake	State	Classic example of northern quaking bog, providing a habitat for numerous unusual and rare plant species.
Wauconda Bog Nature Preserve	–	1972	42°15′14″N 88°07′49″W	Lake	County	Furthest south example of mature bog in the state, with a regionally unusual biotic community.

== See also ==
- List of ecoregions in Illinois
- Illinois Natural History Survey
- List of National Historic Landmarks in Illinois
