= Northern Illinois Fire Sprinkler Advisory Board =

The Northern Illinois Fire Sprinkler Advisory Board (NIFSAB) is a nonprofit organization located in Tinley Park, Illinois, United States.

== Outreach ==
Serving primarily northern Illinois, as well as other parts of Illinois and northwest Indiana, NIFSAB's goal is to educate the public about how fire sprinklers work and their life-safety and property-protection value. The group helps fire departments host live fire demonstrations, especially during national Fire Prevention Week and Month. The organization hosts presentations in homes that have recently installed fire sprinkler systems so that attendees can see what the systems look like behind the walls.

In 2008, NIFSAB was selected by the nonprofit Home Fire Sprinkler Coalition (HFSC) to provide technical support for its ‘’Fire & Sprinkler Burn Demonstration Kit’’. HFSC's kit provides the steps that fire departments take to build and conduct live fire sprinkler demonstrations.

== Chicago high-rise educational campaign ==
In response to a fatal Chicago residential high-rise fire on January 9, 2012, and previous residential high-rise fire fatalities in Chicago in recent years, NIFSAB created an educational campaign to inform Chicago city officials and high-rise condo associations, building managers and tenants/residents about fire sprinkler protection in high-rises and help get buildings in accordance with building codes. The focal point of the educational campaign is the HighRiseLifeSafety.com website, which is a resource for the target audience. Also included in the educational campaign were direct mailings, radio spots, Facebook messages, and a billboard on a corner of LaSalle Street and Chicago Avenue in Chicago.

== Executive Director ==
Erik Hoffer has been NIFSAB’s executive director since September 2019.

== Fire Sprinkler Times Newsletter ==
NIFSAB’s Fire Sprinkler Times newsletter covers fire safety in Illinois and across the United States. It is available online. NIFSAB 2017 Annual Report is also available.
