= War Lords =

African-American militant youth group

The War Lords were a Black militant youth organization in East St. Louis, Illinois, in the 1960s. Founded in January 1965 as The Royal Serpents, the organization's name changed to Imperial War Lords within its first month of existence. The organization sponsored teenage dances, and frequented the First United Lutheran Church, whose pastors Sonny Goldenstein and later Keith Davis ministered to them. The group was led by Charles "Sweed" Jeffries, who was active in the East St. Louis school boycotts in the spring of 1968. He was closely associated with Charles Koen, and often arrested. The War Lords played an active role in Project IMPACT (innovative Methods of Positive Action for Community Tranquility), a federally funded arts and recreation program in East St. Louis which sponsored summer music concerts. In 1968, the War Lords were involved in the formation of Youth Organizations United, a national coalition of street gangs, which included the Black Knights from Memphis, the Black Egyptians from East St. Louis, the Vice Lords from Chicago, the Thugs United from New Orleans and many others. At sometime in 1969, the War Lords joined with the Black Egyptians and possibly Black Culture Inc. as well to form the United Front of East St. Louis. There are few references to the War Lords after that, although in one late press release, Charles Jeffries stated that membership had been opened to whites. The War Lord's transition to mixed race membership lead to other endeavors and the formation of Warlords MC (Motorcycle Club), the nation's first interracial 3 piece patch MC.
