= Fitch, Even, Tabin & Flannery =

Fitch, Even, Tabin & Flannery LLP
- Headquarters: Chicago, Illinois, U.S.
- No. of offices: 5
- No. of attorneys: 50
- Major practice areas: Intellectual Property
- Date founded: 1859
- Website: www.fitcheven.com

Downtown Chicago

Fitch, Even, Tabin & Flannery LLP, (known as Fitch Even), is a premium law firm that specializes in intellectual property (IP) and technology-related law. The firm originated in Chicago, Illinois in 1859, and now has offices throughout the United States and an international client base. Most of the firm's attorneys are registered U.S. patent attorneys (i.e., authorized to practice before the U.S. Patent and Trademark Office and in at least one state in the U.S.) and have backgrounds in high technology or the chemical and life sciences.

== Practice ==
Fitch Even's litigation practice involves all areas of IP including patent, trade secret, trademark, copyright, unfair competition, and related commercial disputes. The firm served as counsel in the landmark patent case Arrhythmia v. Corazonix that dealt with the issue of patentable subject matter before the Federal Circuit Court of Appeals. The firm successfully argued that a software-based mathematical method used in monitoring a patient's heart was patentable subject matter. The Federal Circuit relied on Arrhythmia in a subsequent case, State Street Bank v. Signature Financial Group, that expanded patentable subject matter to include business methods.

The firm also prepares and prosecutes foreign and domestic patent applications, as well as trademark and copyright applications. On average, more than 300 patents per year are issued by the U.S. Patent Office with Fitch Even listed as the legal representative. The firm also filed over 470 trademark applications in 2006.

== Offices ==
- Chicago
- San Diego
- San Luis Obispo
