= Illinois Section American Water Works Association =

The Illinois Section American Water Works Association (ISAWWA) is part of the national American Water Works Association. Established in 1909, the ISAWWA currently represents over 1770 public water supplies of all sizes. ISAWWA members are administrators, utility operators, professional engineers, contractors, manufacturers, scientists, professors, health professionals, regulators, and ordinary citizens.

The mission of ISAWWA is the advancement and dissemination of knowledge concerning the practices in the design, construction, operation, and management of water works, and the promotion of public health, safety, and welfare.
