= Illinois Structural Health Monitoring Project =

- Established: 2002
- Research type: Unclassified
- Field of research: Structural health monitoring
- Director: Prof. Bill F. Spencer, Jr. Prof. Gul Agha
- Students: 7
- Location: Champaign, Illinois, United States
- Operating agency: University of Illinois
- Website: shm.cs.uiuc.edu

The Illinois Structural Health Monitoring Project (ISHMP) is a structural health monitoring project devoted to researching and developing hardware and software systems to be used for distributed real-time monitoring of civil infrastructure. The project focuses on monitoring bridges, and aims to reduce the cost and installation effort of structural health monitoring equipment. It was founded in 2002 by Professor Bill F. Spencer and Professor Gul Agha of the University of Illinois at Urbana–Champaign.

The project aims to minimize the cost of monitoring structures through developing low cost wireless networks of sensor boards, each equipped with an embedded computer. The Illinois Structural Health Monitoring Project also focuses on creating a software toolsuite that can simplify the development of other structural health monitoring devices.

Currently, ISHMP has a wireless sensor network set up on the Jindo Bridge in South Korea. Each sensor board in the network uses real-time data to collect a multitude of different data, and then the microcomputer processes the data and determines the current state of the bridge.

== Overview ==
The Illinois Structural Health Monitoring Project was founded in 2002 when Professor Bill F. Spencer, director of the Smart Structures Technology Laboratory, and Professor Gul Agha, director of the Open Systems Laboratory, began a collaborative effort between the two laboratories at the University of Illinois at Urbana–Champaign. The project aims to develop reliable Wireless hardware and software for distributed real-time structural health monitoring of various infrastructure using multiple sensors on a single structure. Each sensor's data corresponding to a specific region on the structure is used to assess the overall health of the structure.

The Illinois Structural Health Monitoring Project's underlying goal is to minimize the cost of infrastructure inspections though using inexpensive and reliable wireless sensor arrays, significantly reducing the need for physical human inspection. Its main focus has been to monitor bridges using sensor networks. While other wired bridge monitoring systems require excessive amounts of cables and man hours to install, installing a wireless sensor network would prove much less expensive.

The Illinois Structural Health Monitoring Project receives support from the National Science Foundation, Intel Corporation, and the Vodafone-U.S. Foundation Graduate Fellowship.

== Technology ==
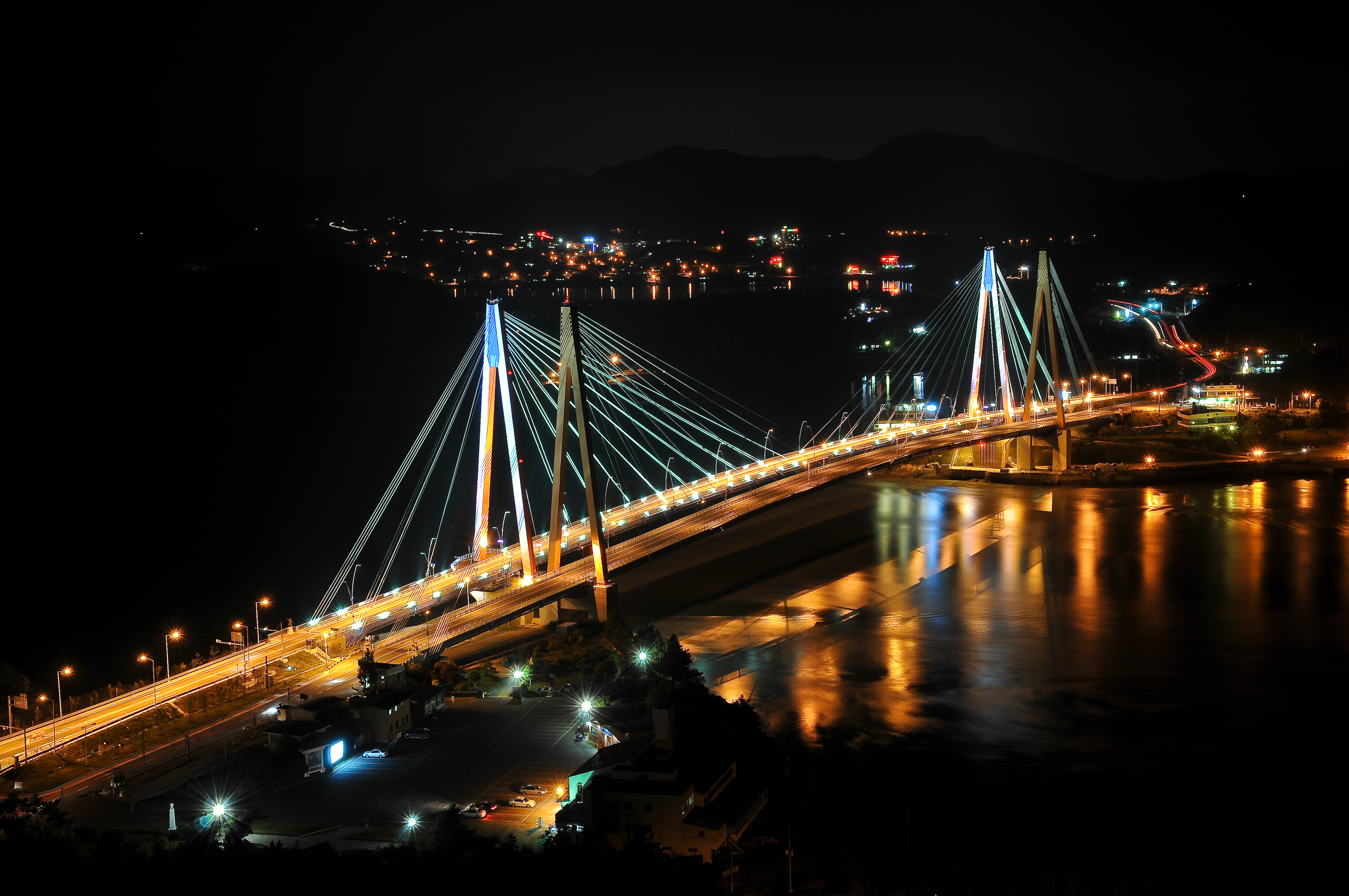
The Jindo Bridge in South Korea has 663 wireless sensors.

Instead of using a single centralized point for collecting data from every sensor in a network, the ISHMP uses sensor platforms with embedded computers, such as Intel's Imote2. The Illinois Structural Health Monitoring Project has designed, developed, and tested various sensors that can stack onto these embedded computers and sense data such as vibrations, humidity levels, and wind speeds, to name a few. Using various power harvesting devices, there is no need for wiring the sensors to an electrical network. Initial tests for the sensor systems were run on a scale model of a truss bridge.

The Illinois Structural Health Monitoring Project has also developed an open source toolsuite that contains a software library of customizable services for structural health monitoring platforms. This simplifies the development of structural health monitoring applications for other sensor systems.

In 2008, a dense array of sensors was deployed on the Jindo Bridge in South Korea and was the first dense deployment of a wireless sensor network on a cable-stayed bridge. This new bridge monitoring system is fully autonomous, and sends out an e-mail when a problem arises. The system wakes up for a few minutes at a time to collect, analyze, and send data, in order to conserve battery power.

== Developments ==
=== Software ===
The ISHMP has developed a software toolsuite with open source services needed for structural health monitoring applications on a network of Intel's Imote2 smart sensors. These services include application services, application tools, and utilities. The application services allow for the implementation of structural health monitoring algorithms on the Imote2 and include tests for both the PC and Imote2. The tools allow for data collection from the sensors on the network, perform damage detection on the structure, and test for radio communication quality.

==== Software developed ====
- ISHMP Services Toolsuite, version 3.0.0
- ISHMP-GUI, version 1.1.0

=== Hardware ===
The ISHMP has also developed a sensor board that is produced by MEMSIC. It is designed to work with the Imote2 smart sensor platform, and is optimized for structural health monitoring applications. The sensor board provides the information output required to comprehend the data collected by the individual sensors. It includes a three-axis accelerometer, a light sensor, a temperature sensor, and humidity sensors. It can also accommodate one additional external analog input signal.

==== Hardware developed ====
- ISM400

== See also ==
- Structural health monitoring
