= McAndrews, Held & Malloy =

American intellectual property firm

- Headquarters: Chicago, Illinois, USA
- No. of offices: 1
- No. of attorneys: 92
- Major practice areas: Intellectual property law and patent law
- Date founded: 1988
- Founders: George P. McAndrews, John J. Held and Timothy J. Malloy
- Website: www.mcandrews-ip.com

McAndrews, Held & Malloy is a Chicago-based intellectual property law firm in the United States. It provides services with respect to intellectual property, antitrust and technology matters, and has a team of registered patent attorneys, agents and technology specialists. The firm serves clients ranging from companies to startups and universities.

== Overview and offerings ==
McAndrews, Held & Malloy was founded in Chicago in 1988 by attorneys George P. McAndrews, Timothy J. Malloy, John J. Held, Lawrence M. Jarvis, and Gregory J. Vogler. Today, the firm has more than 90 attorneys, 74 of whom are registered patent attorneys.

The firm's attorneys deal with patent litigation in jury trials, bench trials and ADR proceedings. In addition, McAndrews offers services in the following areas: patent and trademark procurement and portfolio management, patent interferences, trademark oppositions and cancellations, international practice, intellectual property/technology opinions and investigations, due diligence, mergers and acquisitions support, technology licensing and joint ventures, and technology transfers and donations.

== Awards and accolades ==
McAndrews has been honored within the legal industry and intellectual property field for its firm accomplishments and individual attorney's performances.

Some recent honors include:

- For the three consecutive years, McAndrews, Held & Malloy was named by Intellectual Asset Management (IAM) magazine, in partnership with Ocean Tomo PatentRatings, as one of the intellectual property law firms in America that secured the highest-quality patents for their clients (2012). McAndrews was ranked second in both the "information technology" and "all industries" categories.
- McAndrews, Held & Malloy founding partner and Chairman Timothy J. Malloy, and shareholder Edward A. Mas were included in the brand new IAM publication "IAM Patent 1000 – The World's Leading Patent Practitioners" (2012).
- The firm was ranked nationally for patent law in the U.S. News & Best Lawyers "Best Law Firms" listing (2011).
- Founding partners George P. McAndrews and Timothy J. Malloy were selected for inclusion in the International Who's Who of Patent Lawyers 2012. McAndrews and Malloy were nominated by their peers for this honor, which recognizes the world's leading attorneys in patent law.
- In 2011, founding partner and Chairman Timothy J. Malloy was designated a Fellow of the Litigation Counsel of America, a trial lawyer honorary society composed of less than one-half of one percent of American lawyers.
- Shareholder Christopher V. Carani was selected as one of "40 Illinois Attorneys Under Forty To Watch".
- McAndrews, Held & Malloy attorney Troy Groetken was named one of "40 Illinois Attorneys Under Forty to Watch" for 2009 by Law Bulletin Publishing Company.
- McAndrews, Held & Malloy attorney Jay Nuttall was selected as one of Law Bulletin Publishing Company's 2007 "40 Illinois Attorneys Under Forty to Watch."
- McAndrews, Held & Malloy shareholder Dean A. Pelletier was named one of the "40 Illinois Attorneys Under Forty to Watch."
- McAndrews, Held & Malloy shareholder Herbert D. Hart III was named a "Life Sciences Star" in the inaugural edition of LMG Life Sciences 2012.
- Twelve McAndrews, Held & Malloy attorneys were named 2012 Illinois "Super Lawyers" or "Rising Stars."
- Three McAndrews, Held & Malloy attorneys were honored as 2012 "Best Lawyers in America."
- The firm's founding partners were honored as 2011 "Best Lawyers in America."
- Four attorneys were named "Super Lawyers" and four attorneys were recognized as "Rising Stars" in 2011.
- Four attorneys were recognized as "Top Patent Prosecutors" in 2011 by Patent Research Review and Patent Buddy.
- Seventeen attorneys were recognized as "Leading Lawyers" by Law Bulletin Publishing Company in 2011.
- Partner Robert A. Surrette was selected to receive the 2011 Chicago-Kent College of Law "Distinguished Service Award." He received the award for his volunteer contributions to the Chicago-Kent community, in addition to his many professional accomplishments.
- Eight McAndrews, Held & Malloy attorneys were honored as intellectual property law leaders by Law & Politics (2010).

== Orange Book Blog ==
In 2006, McAndrews, Held & Malloy partner Aaron F. Barkoff, Ph.D., founded the "Orange Book Blog", which is a respected weblog reporting on new developments in pharmaceutical patent law and FDA law. Barkoff has extensive experience in Abbreviated New Drug Application litigation, from pre-filing investigations and strategy to dispositive motions, trials and appeals. He provides U.S. Food and Drug Administration (FDA) regulatory advice relating to pharmaceuticals, including advice concerning patent term extensions under Section 156 and Orange Book patent listings. Barkoff is a regular speaker at pharmaceutical patent law conferences.

== Diversity ==
McAndrews, Held & Malloy takes an active approach in maintaining and creating diversity among its employees through its hiring, training, and promoting practices, and through initiatives such as its Women's Group, mentoring programs and flexible work schedules. The firm's attorneys have served in leadership positions with the Arab American Bar Association, the Asian American Bar Association, the Hispanic Lawyers Association of Illinois, the Indian American Bar Association, the Coalition of Women's Initiatives in Law Firms and many other diversity-focused organizations and bar associations.

Each year, McAndrews offers a Diversity in Patent Law Fellowship and a paid summer clerkship to a qualified first-year law student at an ABA-accredited law school who has a diverse background, possesses a degree in science or engineering, and is committed to pursuing a career in patent law in Chicago.

== Careers ==
Many of their attorneys have technical degrees in fields ranging from chemistry and electrical engineering to physics and Ph.D.-level biotechnology.

In 2010, McAndrews, Held & Malloy was featured in the Chicago Tribune's Top Workplaces listing. It was also one of only three intellectual property/technology firms in the country included in Kimm Alayne Walton's book, "America's Greatest Places to Work With A Law Degree."
