= Gensburg-Markham Prairie =

Tallgrass prairie in Illinois, US

- IUCN category III (natural monument or feature)
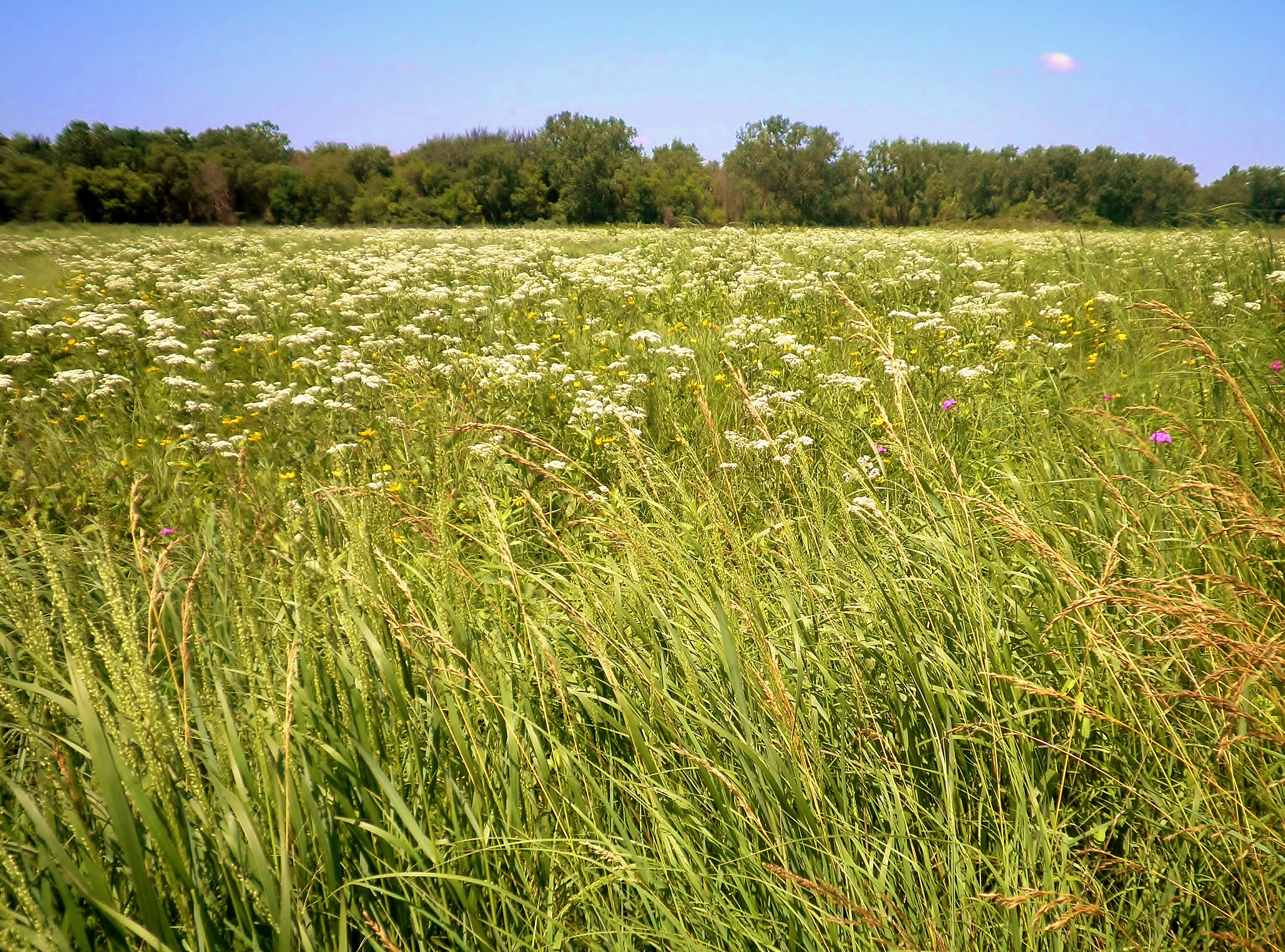

- Location within Illinois
- Location: Cook County, Illinois, US
- Nearest city: Markham
- Coordinates: 41°36′25″N 87°41′16″W
- Area: 100 acres (40 ha)
- Established: 1971
- Governing body: Northeastern Illinois University, the Natural Land Institute, and the Nature Conservancy

U.S. National Natural Landmark
- Designated: 1987

The Gensburg-Markham Prairie, also known as Markham Prairie, is a 105.6-acre (427,000 m^{2}) high-quality tallgrass prairie located in Markham in the Chicago metropolitan area. It is managed by Northeastern Illinois University and The Nature Conservancy and is part of TNC's larger Markham Shkode Prairies Preserve. Described by the Illinois Department of Natural Resources as "an unusual example of sandy loam prairie", it is a National Natural Landmark.

== Ecology ==
The Gensburg-Markham Prairie dates its origins back to the closing years of the Wisconsin glaciation, when postglacial Lake Chicago deposited a large sand beach in what would later become a section of southern Cook County. The poorly drained, damp, sandy soil resisted successful farming, and early pioneer settlers left patches of tallgrass prairie grasses and forbs alone.

== History ==
Much of the prairie area was annexed by the municipality of Markham, Illinois, a suburb located south of Chicago. In Illinois, annexations of this type were a precursor to real estate development. However, the prairie patch's relatively poor drainage made it less attractive to land development. Furthermore, in the years after World War II Markham became an economically troubled and relatively slow-growing community. Finally, in 1971, the Gensburg family, owners of a key 60-acre (240,000 m^{2}) parcel at the heart of the prairie, donated the parcel to Northeastern Illinois University. The prairie's current name, Gensburg-Markham Prairie, commemorates this donation.

== Restoration and today ==
At the time of donation in 1971, the Gensburg-Markham Prairie had become deeply degraded by invasive exotic plants. Decades of prairie restoration work, begun by Northeastern Illinois University's Robert Betz, have cleared away some of the brush and allowed much of the original prairie's tallgrass flora to re-establish itself. Controlled burns have played a key role in this work. The prairie was listed as an Illinois Nature Preserve in September 1980.

More than 100 acres (0.40 km^{2}) of tallgrass prairie within the larger grassland are now classified as high-quality tallgrass prairie. The grassland is owned by Northeastern Illinois University with a few small inholdings owned by the Nature Conservancy. Northeastern Illinois University manages the preserve.

Characteristic tallgrass prairie fauna, such as the Henslow's sparrow, have been sighted at the prairie.
