= Northern Illinois Bluegrass Association =

US non-profit organization

The Northern Illinois Bluegrass Association (NIBA) is a non-profit organization which promotes and preserves bluegrass music in the northern Illinois (US) area.

== History ==
The NIBA was formed in 1996 as a group of musicians who met weekly to play bluegrass in a barn in Grand Ridge, Illinois. Over time, it developed into a community of musicians and listeners from Illinois, southern Wisconsin, northwestern Indiana and eastern Iowa who share a love of bluegrass music.

== Activities ==
The NIBA organizes and promotes local bluegrass jams and events and participates in the Bluegrass In The Schools program.

The NIBA publishes a newsletter for its members with upcoming event announcements and other bluegrass-related news items.
