= Dunn Fellowship =

The James H. Dunn Memorial Fellowship Program, often referred to as the Dunn Fellow Program or the Dunn Fellowship, is a year-long governmental honors fellowship program in Illinois. The fellowship affords recent college graduates from every state the opportunity to experience and gain first-hand knowledge of Illinois State government and general governmental structure at the executive level. Successful candidates are offered fellowships with the Illinois Office of the Governor in both Chicago and Springfield, Illinois and in Washington, D.C.

Dunn Fellows work directly with management staff in the Office of the Governor and generally gain a broad perspective of the operation of state government. Many fellows upon completion of their year will move on to careers in state government as administrators or other management roles.

== Program history and background ==
The Governor's Yearlong Fellowship Program was established in 1979, which was later renamed the James H. Dunn Memorial Fellowship Program in 1981 by Executive Order 7. This change honored James H. Dunn, a Rockford, Illinois citizen for his outstanding commitment to public service.

Executive Order 3 in 1986 brought all fellowship and internship programs administered by the Office of the Governor under the aegis of the Prescott E. Bloom Internships in Government Program. According to the Dunn Fellowship application, "No one understood the benefit of government internship programs to both the State and the individual better than State Senator Prescott E. Bloom. From 1976 until his premature death in 1986, Senator Bloom sponsored his own annual internships, which successfully introduced hundreds of high school and college students to the inside of state government."

The fellowship's purpose is to develop college graduates who have demonstrated a commitment to academic excellence and community involvement into capable leaders. Fellows are given the opportunity to develop skills in program budgeting, legislation, communication, and research, all of which are strongly demonstrated by successful public administrators. The program addresses the public sector's future need of competent and committed administrators by training these young adults in the operations of state government. Over the course of the fellowship year, the program provides a public sector management training program encouraging fellows to remain in a career oriented toward public service.

In addition, the program enables college graduates to supplement their academic backgrounds, providing them with an opportunity to develop their professional and leadership skills. Also, the program helps to achieve state affirmative action goals through the nomination of qualified minorities, women, and persons with disabilities.

The Dunn Fellowship Program is now administered by the Illinois Department of Central Management Services. Dunn Fellows, however, receive placements as fellows in the Office of the Governor and they are assigned Governor's Office supervisors and represent the Governor's Office as full-time staff during their fellowship.

On July 15, 2009 the Dunn Fellowship was cut from the Fiscal Year 2010 budget by Governor Pat Quinn. After an outpouring of support, the program was restored in August 2009.

== Eligibility and selection process ==
Selection of each incoming class of Dunn Fellows is highly competitive. Applicants typically demonstrate strong performance in areas of academic achievement, community leadership and involvement, extracurricular activities, and career development. While there is no minimum GPA to apply, successful candidates normally appear in the upper percentiles of their graduating classes.

Minimum criteria for applying to the Dunn Fellowship Program are as follows:

- Have completed at least a bachelor's degree from an accredited university by the time of the start of the program (August 1 of each year).
- Be a recent college graduate (or have recently completed graduate school). While there is no time limit defining "recent," the program is designed for graduates who have recently finished their college education.
- Be legally allowed to work in the State of Illinois.
- Complete the application packet.

There are no preferences to academic majors or programs of study when considering candidates for fellowships. However, certain programs tend to offer training and experience in areas valuable to fellows. Successful candidates usually have participated in programs that encourage academic rigor, analytical skills, public policy research, and critical thinking.

After the application deadline has passed, senior members of the Governor's Office and Illinois Department of Central Management Services, Personnel Division will review applications and select approximately 50 candidates for in-person interviews. Fellowships will be awarded shortly after interviews are completed. Approximately 19 fellowships are awarded each year.

== Program composition and activities ==
Fellows are classified as full-time employees with the Illinois State Government. Fellows work in a variety of policy areas and administrative teams, directly assisting with the day-to-day operations of the State. Throughout the program history, fellows have either been assigned a work post for an entire year, allowing the fellow to specialize in one specific area of government administration, or fellows have cycled through a variety of posts throughout their fellowship (i.e. changing posts after each 3-month period to receive a broad view of governance.)

Fellows have typically worked in all departments and teams of the Office of the Governor, including press, policy development, staff support, outreach programs, legislative affairs, and budget. It is the goal of the program to give fellows the necessary experience to become competent public sector administrators, which is accomplished in part by giving fellows a broad perspective in state government to help achieve this goal.

Throughout the program's history, Dunn Fellows have also done a variety of activities together including participation in leadership and career development seminars, community service projects and volunteerism, and tours and group outings.

== Alumni ==
Many Dunn Fellow alumni are promoted within state government to posts involving management of staff and individual projects. In addition, a good portion of Dunn Fellows return to graduate school or pursue training programs immediately following the fellowship to assist their career development. The Fellowship is represented throughout the public and private sectors, with many former fellows working at the management level in their respective fields of interest.

An alumni association is in the formation stage. Its mission will be to connect Dunn Fellow classes, provide networking opportunities, and promote community service among past and current Dunn Fellows.
