= Blueprint for Disaster: The Unraveling of Chicago Public Housing =

2009 book by D. Bradford Hunt

- Author: D. Bradford Hunt
- Language: English
- Series: Historical Studies of Urban America
- Publisher: University of Chicago Press
- Publication date: July 15, 2009
- Publication place: United States
- Media type: Hardcover
- Pages: 392
- ISBN: 978-0-226-36085-0

Blueprint for Disaster: The Unraveling of Chicago Public Housing is a history of the public housing program in Chicago.

== Overview ==
This book seeks to explain what went wrong with Chicago public housing through a detailed history. The reasons offered for the "disaster" include high youth-to-adult ratios, the loss of working-class families as more private sector housing became available, and high-rise design at Cabrini–Green and other infamous projects. Federal public housing administrators emphasized cost cutting in construction, which appeased Congressional critics of the program but led to a miserable quality of life for generations who had to live in high-rise towers.

According to Hunt, high youth-to-adult ratios caused chaos in the high-rise towers. In most Chicago neighborhoods, two adults supervise one child. In many public housing sites in Chicago, the ratio is one adult supervising two children. In one of the most crime-ridden, Robert Taylor Homes, the ratio was almost three children for every adult. More than 70% of the apartments built by the Chicago Housing Authority (CHA) from 1954 to 1964 had three or more bedrooms. Did high youth-to-adult ratio lead to crime? Elizabeth Taylor, reviewing the book for the Chicago Tribune, seems skeptical but finds that the book is still an important contribution to the literature.

The loss of the working class is another important theme. Prior to 1967, more than half of the residents of Chicago public housing worked. After 1967, the percentage steadily dropped until it reached approximately 10% in the 1980s. In an important observation, Mr. Hunt explains that when Chicago had a shortage of private sector housing (the 1940s and 1950), public housing was desirable. When private housing became readily available starting in the 1960s, the working class left public housing.

Design is a third theme. Many have written about high-rise design as a contributor to the decline of public housing, so there was a risk that the book would retread familiar ground here. Instead, Mr. Hunt digs into the historical records and unearths some gems tying the design of the Chicago buildings to the cost-cutting obsessions of Washington bureaucrats. Cost cutting first became a political football back in the 1930s when Senator Harry Byrd added construction cost limits to the original public housing statute. Nathan Strauss and John Taylor Egan are federal administrators who are portrayed as driving the design train and running the public housing program into the ground. Their obsession with cost-cutting led them to promote 50 units per acre as the ideal density, with site plans that emphasized long, narrow and tall buildings to minimize sitework cost. While the Corbusier modernism fad might have been a factor in the design decisions, a much more important factor was the construction cost limits imposed by the federal administrators of the public housing program. The public housing program train runs so far off the tracks that Mayor Richard J. Daley begs Congress to put an end to the cost-cutting so he can build normal Chicago communities with the federal program.

The final chapters, on the Gautreaux public housing desegregation case and the rebirth of public housing, cover the messy attempts to remedy Chicago public housing. The lawyer who filed the Gautreaux lawsuit in the 1960s and battled it out for more than 30 years, Alexander Polikoff, is portrayed as a crusader who faced opposition from both the white establishment (especially Mayor Richard J. Daley) and black community activists. Polikoff has fought for Chicago to open all of its neighborhoods to subsidized African-American families, a fight that has drawn many opponents over the years. The final chapter offers a fairly balanced perspective on the effort to rebuild Chicago public housing in the 1990s through a "Plan for Transformation." Hunt views the transformation effort as important in acknowledging the failure of high-rise public housing, but the book recognizes that the plan's implementation may not be kind to the poorest of the poor.

== See also ==
- Hills v. Gautreaux
