= Lee v. Keith =

United States court case

- Court: United States Court of Appeals for the Seventh Circuit
- Full case name: David Lee v. John Keith, et al
- Argued: June 9, 2006
- Decided: September 18, 2006
- Citation: 463 F.3d 763 (7th Cir. 2006)

Court membership
- Judges sitting: Kenneth Francis Ripple, Daniel Anthony Manion, Diane S. Sykes

Case opinions
- Majority: Sykes, joined by Ripple, Manion

Laws applied
- First Amendment; Fourteenth Amendment

Lee v. Keith, 463 F.3d 763 (7th Cir. 2006) was a case in which, on September 18, 2006, the United States Court of Appeals for the Seventh Circuit struck down Illinois' ballot access laws, opining:

In combination, the ballot access requirements for independent legislative candidates in Illinois--the early filing deadline, the 10% signature requirement, and the additional statutory restriction that disqualifies anyone who signs an independent candidate's nominating petition from voting in the primary--operate to unconstitutionally burden the freedom of political association guaranteed by the First and Fourteenth Amendments. Ballot access barriers this high--they are the most restrictive in the nation and have effectively eliminated independent legislative candidacies from the Illinois political scene for a quarter of a century--are not sustainable based on the state's asserted interest in deterring party splintering, factionalism, and frivolous candidacies.
