= List of ecoregions in Illinois =

Illinois ecoregion map prepared by the USEPA

The list of ecoregions in Illinois are lists of terrestrial ecoregions (see also, ecosystem) of the United States' State of Illinois, as defined separately by the United States Environmental Protection Agency (USEPA), and by the World Wildlife Fund. Illinois' ecology is in a land area of 56,400 square miles (146,000 km^{2}); the state is 385 miles (620 km) long and 218 miles (351 km) wide and is located between latitude: 36.9540° to 42.4951° N, and longitude: 87.3840° to 91.4244° W, with primarily a humid continental climate.

== USEPA ==
The EPA ecoregion classification system has four levels, but only Levels I, III, and IV are shown on this list. Level I divides North America into 15 broad ecoregions (or biomes). Illinois is almost entirely within the Eastern Temperate Forest environment Level I region, although very small sections in its extreme west are in the Great Plains, Level I region. Level IV ecoregions (denoted by numbers and letters) are a further subdivision of Level III ecoregions (denoted by numbers alone). In general, Illinois transitions from the forests, to savannah, to tall grass prairie, and is now largely used for agriculture or urbanized, although in its far south are the forested highlands of the Shawnee Hills and along its major rivers varying topography and biome occurs. Its larger ecoregion areas are 'corn belt' plains, known for rich, thick loess (in its north, center and east, particularly 54a) and the 'rivers and hills' region, which also has large till plains in Illinois' south (72j) and west (72i).

=== Great Plains ===
- 40 Central Irregular Plains (small section in the west)
  - 40a - Loess Flats and Till Plains
- 47 Western Corn Belt Plains (small section in the west)
  - 47f - Rolling Loess Prairies

=== Eastern Temperate Forest ===
These forests stretch from eastern Texas and northern Florida to the Adirondacks and Wisconsin. For a general description of these forests, refer to Temperate Deciduous Forest. The standard reference is The Deciduous Forest of Eastern North America.

- 52 Driftless Area (far northwestern Illinois)
  - 52a - Savanna Section
  - 52b - Paleozoic Plateau/Coulee Section
- 53 Southeastern Wisconsin Till Plains (northern Illinois)
  - 53a - Rock River Drift Plain
  - 53b - Kettle Moraines
- 54 Central Corn Belt Plains (northern and central Illinois)
  - 54a - Illinois/Indiana Prairies
  - 54b - Chicago Lake Plain
  - 54c - Kankakee Marsh
  - 54d - Sand Area
  - 54e - Chiwaukee Prairie Region
  - 54f - Valparaiso-Wheaton Morainal Complex
  - 54g - Rock River Hills
- 71 Interior Plateau (far southern Illinois)
  - 71a - Crawford-Mammoth Cave Uplands
  - 71m - Northern Shawnee Hills
  - 71n - Southern Shawnee Hills
- 72 Interior River Valleys and Hills (along the State boundary rivers and into the interior along the Illinois River, also the broad somewhat hillier southern and western till plains)
  - 72a - Wabash-Ohio Bottomlands
  - 72b - Glaciated Wabash Lowlands
  - 72d - Upper Mississippi Alluvial Plain
  - 72e - Middle Mississippi Alluvial Plain
  - 72f - River Hills
  - 72g - Southern Ozarkian River Bluffs
  - 72i - Western Dissected Illinoian Till Plain
  - 72j - Southern Illinoian Till Plain
  - 72k - Cretaceous Hills
  - 72l - Karstic Northern Ozarkian River Bluffs
  - 72m - Wabash River Bluffs and Low Hills
- 73 Mississippi Alluvial Plain (extreme southern Illinois)
  - 73a - Northern Holocene Meander Belts
  - 73c - St. Francis Lowlands

== World Wildlife Fund ==
Realm	Biome	Ecoregion	State Location
Nearctic	Temperate broadleaf and mixed forests	Central U.S. hardwood forests	Southern Illinois
Nearctic	Temperate broadleaf and mixed forests	Mississippi lowland forests	Far Southern Illinois
Nearctic	Temperate broadleaf and mixed forests	Upper Midwest forest-savanna transition	Far Northern Illinois
Nearctic	Temperate grasslands, savannas, and shrublands	Central forest-grasslands transition	Northern and Central Illinois

== See also ==
- Geography of Illinois
- Climate of Illinois
- Geology of Illinois
- Fauna of Illinois
- Illinois Natural History Survey
- List of ecoregions in the United States (EPA)
- List of ecoregions in the United States (WWF)
- List of National Natural Landmarks in Illinois
