= Illinois Clean Jobs Bill =

99th Illinois General Assembly
- Citation: Bill Status of HB2607 - 99th General Assembly

Legislative history
- Bill title: H.B. 2607 / S.B. 1485
- Introduced by: Representative Elaine Nekritz (D-Northbrook); Senator Don Harmon (D-Oak Park)
- Introduced: February 19, 2015
- First reading: February 19, 2015

Summary
- Amends the Illinois Power Agency Act, Public Utilities Act, Environmental Protection Act, and other changes.
- Status: Not passed

The Illinois Clean Jobs Bill is a renewable-energy bill that was introduced in the 99th Illinois General Assembly. It was sponsored by Democratic state senator Don Harmon of Oak Park and Democratic state representative Elaine Nekritz of Northbrook. The bill died in committee.

Proponents of the bill claimed it would create tens of thousands of new jobs in Illinois if the bill is passed and signed into law. Some supporters claim that it would create 32,000 new jobs. Bill supporters claimed that passage of the bill will cause energy demand to decrease by twenty percent by the year 2025.

However, opponents asserted that under the state of Illinois' current energy efficiency law, utility companies pass on new costs to customers. If the Illinois Clean Jobs Bill passed, they claimed, households and businesses that use electricity would pay more money to subsidize the cost of wind turbines and other renewable energy sources.

== Background ==
In 1983, the Illinois state government created the Illinois Citizens Utility Board (CUB). The purpose of the board was to serve as an advocacy group to help households deal with energy prices. The original law that created the CUB mandated one seat on the CUB board for each congressional district. Currently, only nine of Illinois' 18 districts have a representative on the board.

In 2013, CUB had an income of $1.3 million and expenses of $1.9 million, amounting to a deficit of over $600,000.

Currently, the state's energy supply comes from a variety of sources. Renewable energy accounts for seven percent.

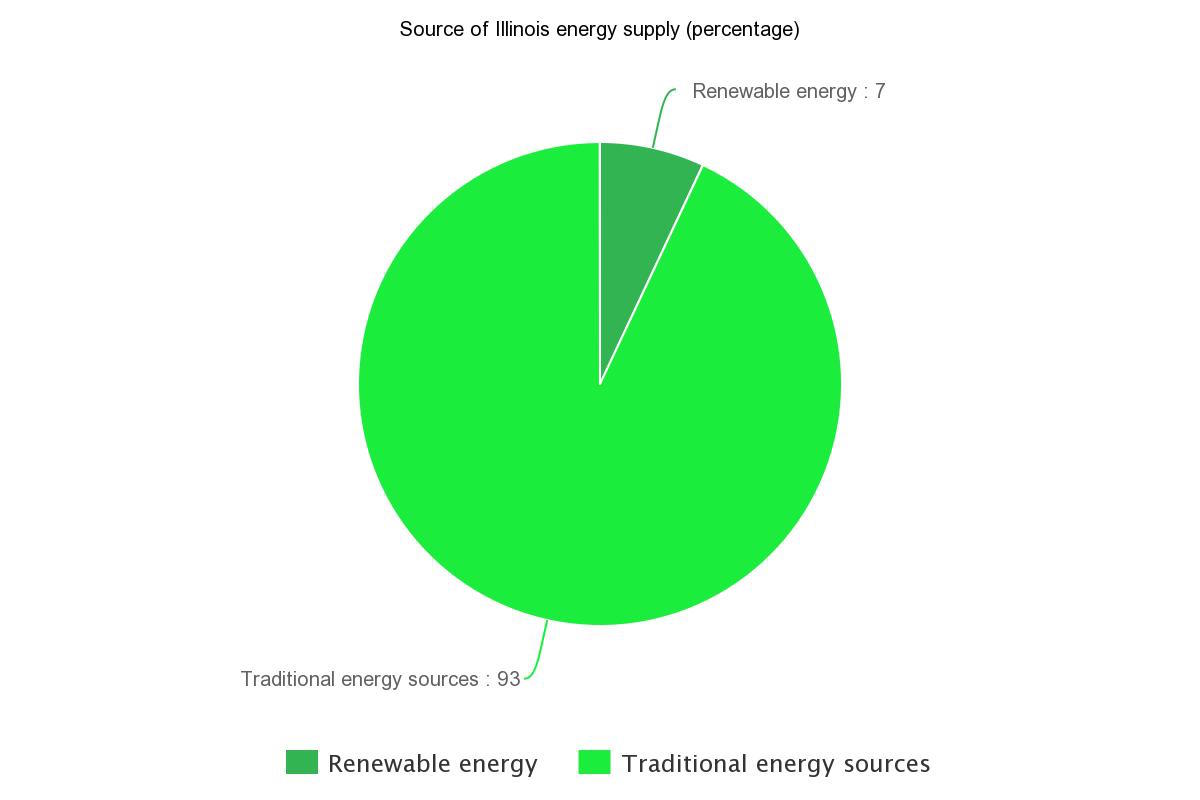
Source of Illinois energy supply

The state's current energy efficiency policy statement includes a declaration: "It serves the public interest to allow electric utilities to recover costs for reasonably and prudently incurred expenses for energy efficiency and demand response measures."

On February 19, 2015, the bill was introduced in the Illinois General Assembly. The main sponsors in the Illinois Senate are state senators Don Harmon, David Koehler, and Jacqueline Collins. The main sponsors of the bill in the Illinois House are state representatives Elaine Nekritz, Robyn Gabel, Michael Fortner, and Christian Mitchell.

In March 2015, a state senate committee voted on the bill. The only senator to vote "no" was Republican Kyle McCarter of Lebanon. In an interview with the Madison County Record, McCarter said, "If we shift to 35 percent the cost is going to be outrageous." His remark referred to the bill's mandate to change the state government goal for renewable energy to 35 percent of all energy used in Illinois by the year 2030.

== Supporters ==
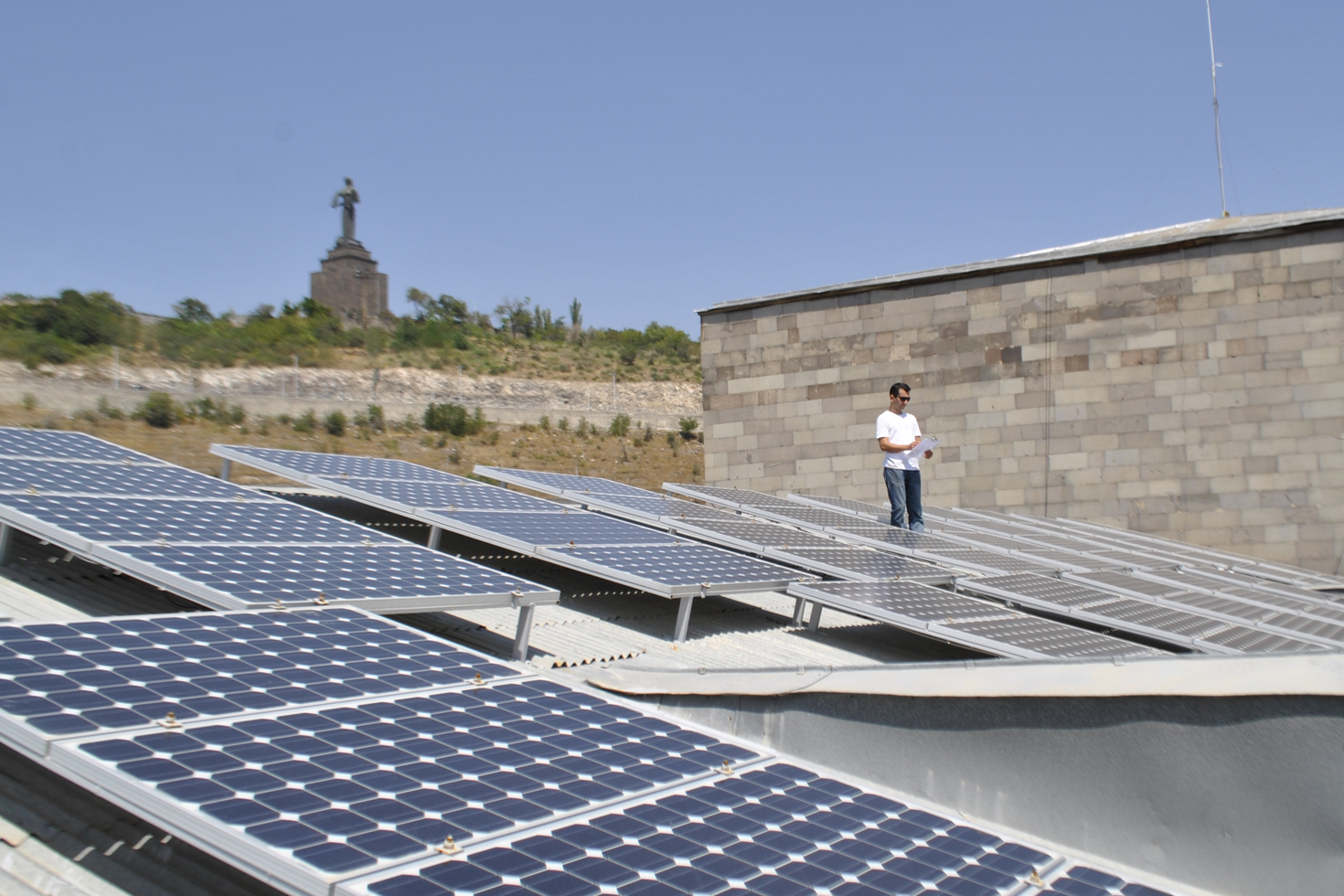
Many supporters of the bill are companies that manufacture and sell solar panels.

Supporters of the legislation formed a group called the Illinois Clean Jobs Coalition. The group boasts over 150 members. Members are a for-profit companies that sell products and services related to renewable energy, as well as political advocacy groups.

For example, for-profit companies that are members of the Illinois Clean Jobs Coalition include:

- Schneider Electric - an energy management company headquartered in Rueil-Malmaison, Île-de-France, France
- Mainstream Renewable Power - an international company that installs solar energy and wind technologies and has multi-billion dollar contracts in Africa, the United Kingdom and other locations
- SoCore Energy - a division of Edson with offices in Chicago, Arizona and Ohio that sells solar panels
- Jul Energy - a company in Minnesota that sells wind, solar, biomass and natural gas systems
- KenJiva Energy Systems LLC - a company based in Chicago that installs solar panels
- Microgrid Solar - a company in Missouri that designs and installs solar panels
- NuMat Technologies - an Illinois-based gas transportation company
- Kerri Barber Consulting - a consulting company that helps companies improve marketing and public relations

According to the Illinois Clean Jobs Coalition, "The bill provides a range of tools to help customers and the environment, including the option of a market-based mechanism to limit carbon pollution." The bill would increase the state's requirement for how much energy in Illinois comes from renewable sources (known as the "Renewable Portfolio Standard"). The current state government goal is 25 percent by 2025. The bill would change that goal to 35 percent by 2030.

One of the most influential non-government advocates of the bill is Duck Munson, the director of the Midwest Clean Energy program for the Environmental Defense Fund.

== Synopsis ==
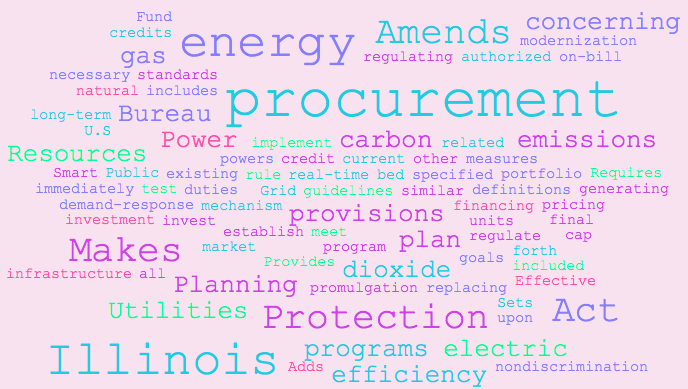
Word cloud of the legislative synopsis

The Illinois General Assembly provides the following synopsis of the legislation (the text provided below is a direct quote):

- Amends the Illinois Power Agency Act.
- Requires the Planning and Procurement Bureau to establish a long-term renewable resources procurement plan that includes all renewable energy credits necessary to meet specified goals (replacing the current renewable portfolio standards).
- Sets forth guidelines for what shall be included in the procurement plan.
- Makes changes to provisions concerning definitions, the powers of the Agency, the Illinois Power Agency Renewable Energy Resources Fund, and the duties of the Planning and Procurement Bureau.
- Amends the Public Utilities Act.
- Makes changes concerning nondiscrimination, energy efficiency and demand-response measures, natural gas efficiency programs, real-time pricing, infrastructure investment and modernization, the Illinois Smart Grid test bed, and on-bill financing programs for electric and gas utilities.
- Amends the Environmental Protection Act.
- Adds provisions related to renewable energy credit procurement.
- Provides that upon promulgation by the U.S. Environmental Protection Agency of a final rule regulating carbon dioxide emissions from existing electric generating units, the Illinois Environmental Protection Agency shall be authorized to implement a cap and invest program or similar market mechanism to regulate carbon dioxide emissions. Makes other changes.
- Effective immediately.

== Amendments to Illinois Compiled Statutes ==
The legislation would amend the following state statutes:

- 20 ILCS 3855/1-5
- 20 ILCS 3855/1-10
- 20 ILCS 3855/1-20
- 20 ILCS 3855/1-56
- 20 ILCS 3855/1-75
- 220 ILCS 5/8-101 from Ch. 111 2/3, par. 8-101
- 220 ILCS 5/8-103
- 220 ILCS 5/8-104
- 220 ILCS 5/16-107
- 220 ILCS 5/16-108.5
- 220 ILCS 5/16-108.8
- 220 ILCS 5/16-111.5
- 220 ILCS 5/16-111.5B
- 220 ILCS 5/16-111.5C (new)
- 220 ILCS 5/16-111.7
- 220 ILCS 5/16-115D
- 220 ILCS 5/19-140
- 415 ILCS 5/9.1
