= Home Fire Sprinkler Coalition =

The Home Fire Sprinkler Coalition (HFSC) was founded in 1996. It is a nonprofit organization working in the United States and Canada. HFSC's web site details its mission statement and board members. For several years, the United States Fire Administration has had a partnership with HFSC. Since 1997, HFSC has worked with Ron Hazelton as its spokesperson. HFSC has earned several federal Fire Prevention & Safety Grants, primarily to develop free educational materials for use by fire departments. In 2010, HFSC collaborated with FM Global to study the environmental impact of home fires.

== Board of directors ==
The founding organizations of HFSC are the National Fire Protection Association (NFPA), the American Fire Sprinkler Association (AFSA), and the National Fire Sprinkler Association (NFSA). Other members of HFSC's Board include the Canadian Automatic Sprinkler Association (CASA), FM Global, the International Association of Fire Chiefs (IAFC), the National Association of State Fire Marshals (NASFM), the National Fallen Firefighters Foundation (NFFF), the National Volunteer Fire Council (NVFC), the Phoenix Society for Burn Survivors, State Farm Insurance, Underwriters Laboratories Inc. (UL) and the United States Fire Administration (USFA).

== Awards ==
In 2011 HFSC received the Senator Paul S. Sarbanes Fire Service Safety Leadership Award. In 2011 HFSC received a Fire Prevention & Safety Grant. In 2012, HFSC received a Fire Prevention & Safety Grant
