= Climate of Illinois =

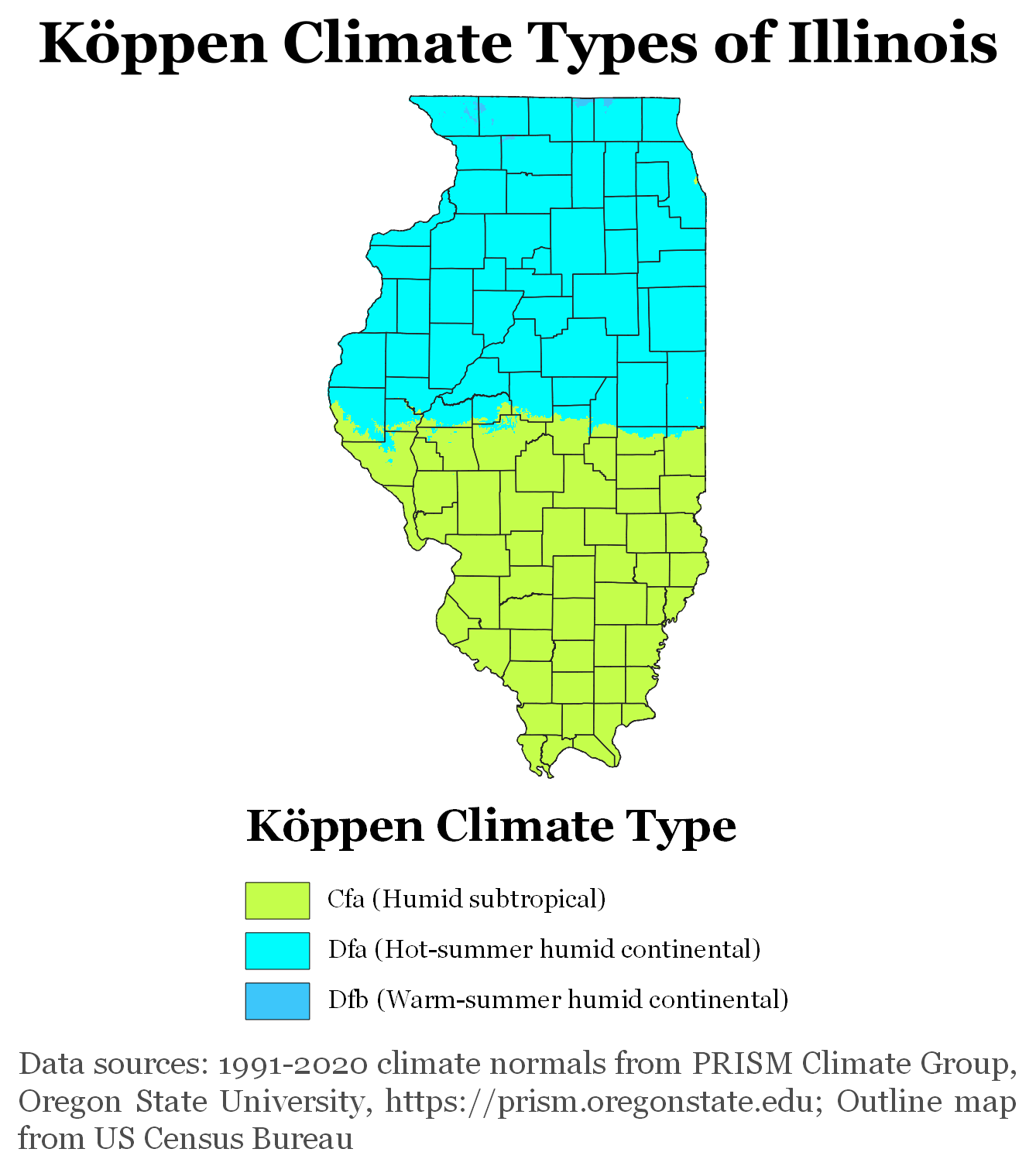
Köppen climate types of Illinois (with counties overlaid), using 1991-2020 climate normals.

The Climate of Illinois describes the weather conditions, and extremes, noted within the state of Illinois, United States, over time.

Because of its nearly 400-mile (640 km) length and mid-continental location, Illinois has a widely varying climate. Most of Illinois has a humid continental climate (Köppen climate classification Dfa) with hot, humid summers and cool to cold winters. However, the southern half of the state, from about Springfield southward, has a humid subtropical climate (Köppen Cfa) with winters becoming more moderate as one travels south. Average yearly precipitation for Illinois varies from 48 inches or 1,220 mm at the southern tip to 35 inches or 890 mm in the northern portion of the state. Normal annual snowfall exceeds 38 inches or 96.52 cm in Chicago, while the southern portion of the state normally receives less than 14 inches or 36 cm. The highest temperature recorded in Illinois was 117 °F (47.2 °C), recorded on July 14, 1954, at East St. Louis, while the lowest temperature was −38 °F (−38.9 °C), recorded on January 31, 2019, at Mount Carroll.

Illinois averages around 50 days of thunderstorm activity a year which put it somewhat above average for number of thunderstorm days for the United States. Illinois is vulnerable to tornadoes with an average of 54 occurring annually, which puts much of the state at around 9.7 tornadoes per 10,000 square miles (30,000 km^{2}) annually. The deadliest tornado on record in the nation occurred largely in Illinois. The Tri-State Tornado of 1925 killed 695 people in three states; 613 of the victims lived in Illinois.

== Temperatures ==
Due to the urban heat island effect, cities tend to be 2 °F or 1.1 °C warmer on average, which is most noticeable overnight.

=== Heat ===
The 1995 Chicago heat wave was one of the worst weather-related disasters in state history, with 525 dead within a five-day period as overnight lows remained as high as 84 °F (28.9 °C) and daytime highs reached up to 106 °F (41.1 °C). The most deadly heatwave in the history of the United States struck Illinois during July 1936, which killed 2,656 people.

=== Cold ===
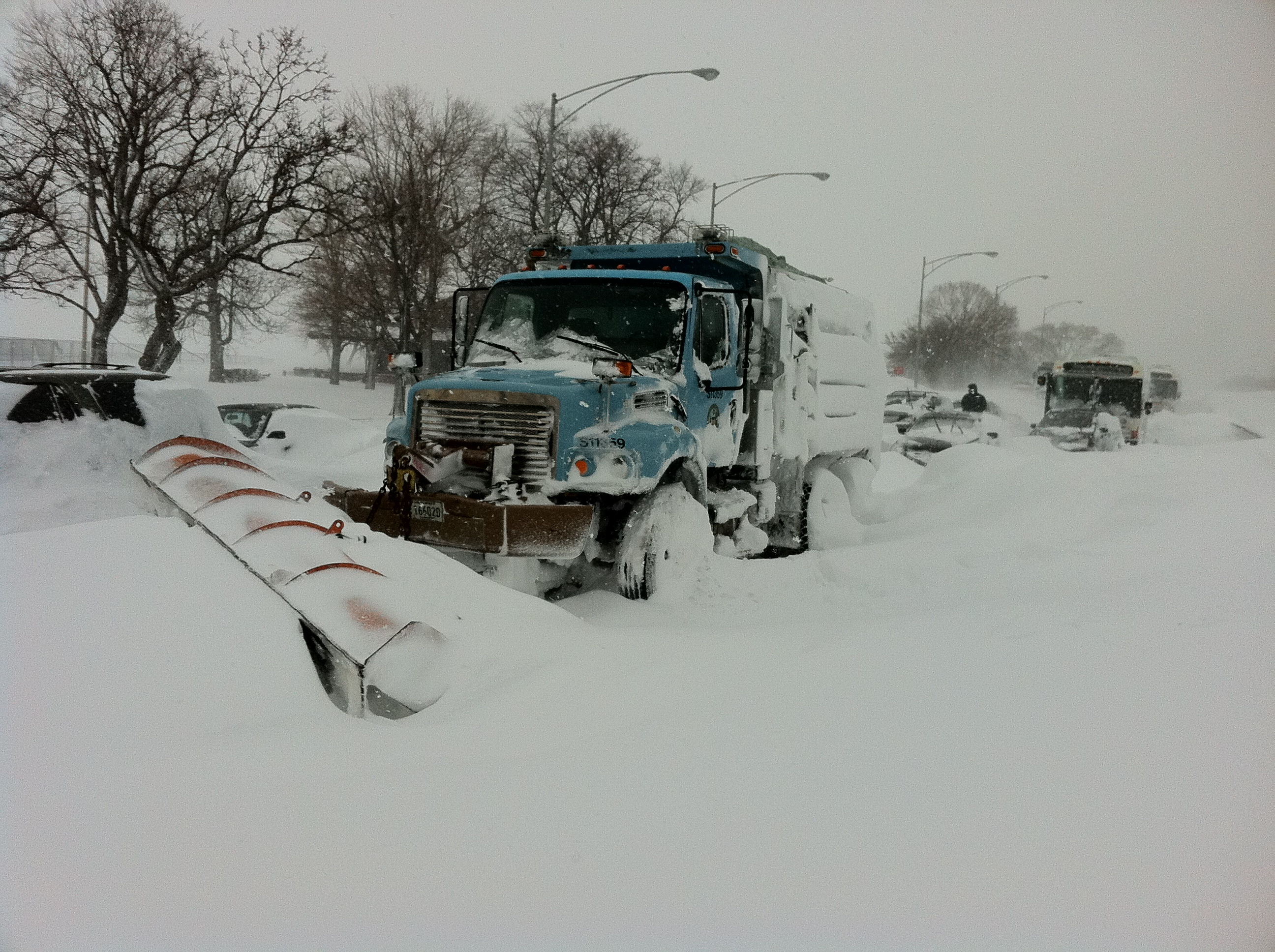
Abandoned vehicles on Lake Shore Drive in Northern Illinois after a large snowstorm

Extreme temperature changes can occur within minutes with the passage of a strong cold front through the state. On December 20, 1836, temperatures fell 40 °F or 22.2 °C in minutes, which supposedly froze people to their saddles and chickens in their tracks. Until 2019, the lowest temperature was −37 °F (−38.3 °C), recorded on January 15, 2009, at Rochelle. However, Illinois did not officially recognize this measurement, as it was made from a small airport and there were no quality control procedures applied to the measurement. As a result, the official record-lowest temperature for the state was −36 °F (−37.8 °C) recorded at Congerville on 5 January 1999. In 2019, the January North American Cold Wave struck Illinois. This resulted in a new record low temperature, −38 °F (−38.9 °C), recorded on January 31, 2019, at Mount Carroll.

Monthly average high and low temperatures in Fahrenheit for various Illinois cities
City	Jan	Feb	Mar	Apr	May	Jun	Jul	Aug	Sep	Oct	Nov	Dec
Cairo	41/25	47/29	57/39	69/50	77/58	86/67	90/72	88/69	81/61	71/49	57/39	46/30
Chicago	31/16	35/20	47/29	59/39	70/48	80/58	84/64	82/63	75/54	62/43	48/32	35/21
Edwardsville	36/19	42/24	52/34	64/45	75/55	84/64	85/59	86/66	79/58	68/46	53/35	41/25
Moline	30/12				73/50	83/60	86/64	84/62	76/53	64/42	48/30	34/18
Peoria	30/12				73/51	82/60	86/65	84/63	77/54	64/42	49/31	36/20
Rockford	30/12				71/48	81/58	84/63	82/61	75/52	62/40	47/30	33/17
Springfield	30/12				74/53	83/62	86/66	84/64	78/55	67/44	51/34	38/23

== Precipitation ==
Average yearly precipitation for Illinois varies from just over 48 inches (1,200 mm) at the southern tip to just under 32 inches (810 mm) in the northern portion of the state. May and June are the wettest months of the year. Flooding is the most damaging weather hazard within the state. Increased warming within urban heat islands leads to an increase in rainfall downwind of cities. Lake Michigan leads to an increase in winter precipitation along its south shore due to lake effect snow forming over the relatively warm lakes. In summer, the relatively cooler lake leads to a more stable atmosphere near the lake shore, reducing rainfall potential.

=== Snowstorms ===
While normal annual snowfall exceeds 38 inches (96.52 cm) in Chicago, the southern portion of the state normally receives less than 14 inches (35.56 cm). The snowiest winter on record for Chicago was 89.7 inches (227.84 cm) during the winter of 1978–79. The city has also recorded two other winters with snowfall in excess of 80 inches (203.20 cm)—1977-78 and 2013-14. During the winter of 1830–31, southern sections of the state were covered with 3 feet (91 cm) of snow, with drifts up to 6 feet (180 cm) tall. Storms exceeding the normal winter value are possible within one day mainly in the southern half of the state. The heaviest snowfall recorded in Chicago history was 23 inches (58.42 cm) during the Blizzard of 1967.

=== Thunderstorms and severe weather ===
Illinois averages around 50 days of thunderstorm activity a year which put it somewhat above average for the number of thunderstorm days for the United States. Thunderstorms contribute over half of the annual precipitation statewide. Illinois is vulnerable to tornadoes with an average of 35 occurring annually, which puts much of the state at around 5 tornadoes per 10,000 square miles (30,000 km^{2}) annually. Peak tornado activity occurs between April and June. Illinois also receives the remnants of tropical cyclones which have struck the Gulf coast. One of the wetter systems, Tropical Storm Claudette, impacted the state in July 1979 bringing rainfall amounts up to 7.64 inches (194 mm).

== See also ==
- Climate change in Illinois
- Cold wave
- Heat wave
- List of wettest known tropical cyclone remnants in Illinois
- List of ecoregions in Illinois
