= List of United States military bases in Illinois =

List of United States military bases in Illinois is a listing of current United States military installations located in the State of Illinois.

== Air Force ==
- Scott Air Force Base, Shiloh, Illinois (Home to USTRANSCOM, AMC, and multiple wings (375th AMW, 126th ARW, 932nd AW)
- Springfield Air National Guard Base, Illinois (Home of the 183rd Wing of the Illinois Air National Guard)
- Peoria Air National Guard Base, Illinois (Home of the 182nd Airlift Wing of the Illinois Air National Guard)

== Army ==
- Rock Island Arsenal, Rock Island, Illinois

== Navy ==
- Naval Station Great Lakes, North Chicago, Illinois

== See also ==
- List of United States military bases
- List of United States Army installations
- List of United States Navy installations
- List of United States Air Force installations
- List of United States Marine Corps installations
