= List of Illinois state forests =

This is a list of state forests in Illinois.

== Illinois state forests ==
Name	Location
Big River State Forest	Henderson County
Hidden Springs State Forest	Shelby County
Lowden-Miller State Forest	Ogle County
Sand Ridge State Forest	Mason County
Trail of Tears State Forest	Union County
Union County State Fish & Wildlife Area	Union County

== See also ==
- List of national forests of the United States
