= List of Illinois state symbols =

Location of the state of Illinois in the United States of America

The state of Illinois has adopted numerous symbols over time.

== Insignia ==
Type	Symbol	Adopted	Image	Ref.
Flag	Flag of Illinois	1969	Illinois flag	
Centennial flag	Centennial Flag of Illinois	1918	Illinois centennial flag	
Sesquicentennial flag	Sesquicentennial Flag of Illinois	1968	Illinois sesquicentennial flag	
Seal	Seal of Illinois	1867	Illinois seal	

== Species, geology, and culture ==
Type	Symbol	Image	Law (Note: Unless otherwise indicated, entries are defined in the Illinois Compiled Statutes, Chapter 5 (General Provisions), State Designations Act (5 ILCS 460/))	Adopted
Amphibian	Eastern tiger salamander (Ambystoma tigrinum)		5 ILCS 460/85	2005
Animal	White-tailed deer (Odocoileus virginianus)		5 ILCS 460/45	1982
Artifact	Pirogue		5 ILCS 460/63	2017
Bird	Northern cardinal (Cardinalis cardinalis)		5 ILCS 460/10	1929
Exercise	Cycling		5 ILCS 460/67	2018
Fish	Bluegill (Lepomis macrochirus)		5 ILCS 460/50	1986
Flower	Violet (Viola spp.)	Purple violet	5 ILCS 460/40	1908
Folk dance	Square dance		5 ILCS 460/65	1990
Fruit	Gold Rush Apple (Malus × domestica)		5 ILCS 460/57	2007
Fossil	Tully monster (Tullimonstrum gregarium)		5 ILCS 460/60	1989
Grain	Corn		5 ILCS 460/56.5	2018
Horse	Thoroughbred horse (Equus caballus)	Thoroughbred horse	5 ILCS 460/90	2006
Insect	Monarch butterfly (Danaus plexippus)		5 ILCS 460/15	1975
Mineral	Fluorite (Calcium fluoride)		5 ILCS 460/25	1965
Motto	"State sovereignty, national union"		5 ILCS 460/5 (Note: The motto is defined in the original legislation defining the state seal. The legislation has been renewed.)	1818
Nickname	"The Prairie State"		Traditional	
Pet	Shelter dogs and shelter cats		5 ILCS 460/47	2017
Pie	Pumpkin pie		5 ILCS 460/100	2016
Prairie grass	Big bluestem (Andropogon gerardii)		5 ILCS 460/55	1989
Reptile	Painted turtle (Chrysemys picta)		5 ILCS 460/90	2006
Rock	Dolostone			2022
Slogan	"Land of Lincoln"		5 ILCS 460/30	1955
Snackfood	Popcorn		5 ILCS 460/80	2004
Snake	Eastern milk snake		5 ILCS 460/87	2022
Soil	Drummer silty clay loam (mesic Typic Endoaquoll)		5 ILCS 460/75	2001
Song	"Illinois"		5 ILCS 460/35	1925
Tartan	Illinois Saint Andrew Society Tartan		5 ILCS 460/95	2012
Theatre	The Great American People Show		5 ILCS 460/70	1995
Tree	White oak (Quercus alba) (replaced "Native Oak" adopted in 1908)		5 ILCS 460/40	1973
Vegetable	Sweet corn (Zea mays convar. saccharata var. rugosa)		5 ILCS 460/56	2015
Wildflower	Milkweed (Asclepias spp.)		5 ILCS 460/43	2017
Mushroom	Giant Puffball (Calvatia Gigantea)			2024

== See also ==
- Index of Illinois-related articles
