= Illinois Soil Nitrogen Test =

The Illinois Soil Nitrogen Test ("ISNT") is a method for measuring the amount of Nitrogen in soil that is available for use by plants as a nutrient. The test predicts whether the addition of nitrogen fertilizer to agricultural land will result in increased crop yields.

Nitrogen is essential for plant development. Indeed, for crops that are destined to be food for farm animal or human consumption, incorporation of nitrogen into the crop is an important goal, since this forms the basis for protein in the human diet.

Nitrogen is commonly present in soils in many forms, and there are many ways to measure this nitrogen. None of these are completely satisfactory as a measure of the nitrogen that is available for use by crops. The ISNT is a new (2007) method for measuring nitrogen available for plant uptake.

ISNT estimates the amount of nitrogen present in the soil as amino sugar nitrogen. With respect to corn and soybeans, the optimal range for plant growth appears to be around 225 to 240 mg/Kg. Some form of nitrogen fertilizer is needed if levels are below this range. On the other hand, if levels are above this range, addition of nitrogen fertilizer will not increase crop yield.

In the Corn Belt, since about 1975, the predominant method of estimating the amount of nitrogen needed for corn has been the "yield-based" method. A farmer first estimates the yield of corn he intends to produce. He then applies 1.1 to 1.4 lbs of nitrogen per bushel of expected yield. ISNT represents an alternative approach to managing nitrogen application. However, ISNT does not offer a simple answer as to the amount of nitrogen fertilizer that is needed, or as to the optimal form of that fertilizer.

In field trials in Illinois, some fields have been found to be under-fertilized when managed according to the "yield-based" method, as judged by the ISNT. In the majority of trials, however, the yield-based method calls for the addition of nitrogen far in excess of the levels needed for optimal crop production. This nitrogen, which is applied by farmers at great cost, does not find its way into the crop, but is lost to the atmosphere or leaches into waterways.

Within the corn belt, stalks and other crop residues are left in the field with the intention of enhancing the amount of organic material in the soil. Excessive nitrogen application, however, appears to promote the rapid decomposition of organic matter in the soil, resulting in release of carbon dioxide. As a result, the amount of organic material in soils managed according to the yield-based method in the corn belt appears to be decreasing in spite of the large amounts of crop residues left in the fields.

== See also ==
- Agriculture
- Agronomy
- Soil science
