= List of professional sports teams in Illinois =

The following is a list of current and former professional sports teams in Illinois.

== Current professional sports teams ==
Major professional teams
Club	Sport	League	Founded	Note
Chicago Cubs	Baseball	Major League Baseball	1875	
Chicago White Sox	Baseball	Major League Baseball	1894	Based in Chicago since 1900
Chicago Bulls	Basketball	National Basketball Association	1966	
Chicago Sky	Basketball	Women's National Basketball Association	2005	
Chicago Bears	Football	National Football League	1919	
Chicago Blackhawks	Ice hockey	National Hockey League	1926	
Chicago Hounds	Rugby union	Major League Rugby	2022	
Chicago Fire FC	Soccer	Major League Soccer	1997	
Chicago Red Stars	Soccer	National Women's Soccer League	2007	

Minor professional teams
Club	Sport	League	Founded	Note
Peoria Chiefs	Baseball	Midwest League	1983	
Kane County Cougars	Baseball	American Association	1991	
Chicago Dogs	Baseball	American Association	2018	
Gateway Grizzlies	Baseball	Frontier League	2001	
Joliet Slammers	Baseball	Frontier League	2002	
Schaumburg Boomers	Baseball	Frontier League	2012	
Windy City ThunderBolts	Baseball	Frontier League	1995	Formerly the Cook County Cheetahs
Windy City Bulls	Basketball	NBA G League	2016	
Quad City Steamwheelers	Football	Indoor Football League	2018	
Chicago Wolves	Ice hockey	American Hockey League	1994	
Rockford IceHogs	Ice hockey	American Hockey League	1991	
Bloomington Bison	Ice Hockey	ECHL	2024	
Peoria Rivermen	Ice hockey	Southern Professional Hockey League	2013	
Quad City Storm	Ice hockey	Southern Professional Hockey League	2009	Founded as the Louisiana IceGators
Chicago Steel	Ice hockey	United States Hockey League	2000	
Chicago Mustangs	Indoor soccer	Major League Indoor Soccer	2012	
Chicago Fire FC II	Soccer	MLS Next Pro	2021	
Peoria City	Soccer	USL League Two	2020	
Windy City Rollers	Roller Derby	Women's Flat Track Derby Association	2005	
Chicago Union	Ultimate	American Ultimate Disc League	2013	Founded as Windy City Wildfire

== Former professional sports teams ==
Club	Sport	League	Seasons	Note
Bloomington Edge	Football	United Indoor Football; Indoor Football League; Champions Professional Indoor Football League; X-League Indoor Football; Champions Indoor Football	2006–2018	Was known as the Bloomington Extreme from 2006 to 2011
Chicago American Gears	Basketball	National Basketball League; Professional Basketball League of America	1944–1947	
Chicago Bandits	Fastpitch softball	National Pro Fastpitch	2005–2021	
Chicago Blaze	Ice hockey	All American Hockey League	2009	
Chicago Blitz	Football	United States Football League	1983–1984	
Chicago Bruisers	Football	Arena Football League	1987–1989	
Chicago Cardinals	Football	National Football League	1898–1959	Moved to St. Louis, Missouri, and became the St. Louis Cardinals, moved again to the Phoenix area and are now the Arizona Cardinals
Chicago Cats	Soccer	American Soccer League	1975–1976	
Chicago Condors	Basketball	American Basketball League	1998	
Chicago Cougars	Ice hockey	World Hockey Association	1972–1975	
Chicago Enforcers	Football	XFL	2001	
Chicago Express	Ice hockey	ECHL	2010–2011	
Chicago Fire	American football	World Football League	1974	
Chicago Fire Premier	Soccer	USL Premier Development League	2001–2016	
Chicago Hounds	Ice hockey	United Hockey League	2006–2007	
Chicago Hustle	Basketball	Women's Professional Basketball League	1978–1981	
Chicago Machine	Lacrosse	Major League Lacrosse	2006–2010	
Chicago Mustangs	Soccer	North American Soccer League	1967–1968	
Chicago Packers/Chicago Zephyrs	Basketball	National Basketball Association	1961–1962 (Packers); 1962–1963 (Zephyrs)	Moved to Baltimore and became the Baltimore Bullets, moved again to Washington, D.C., and are now the Washington Wizards
Chicago Power	Soccer	American Indoor Soccer Association (1988–1990); National Professional Soccer League (1990–1996)	1988–1996	
Chicago Rockstars	Basketball	American Basketball Association	2006–2007	
Chicago Rush	Football	Arena Football League	2001–2008, 2010–2013	
Chicago Shamrox	Lacrosse	National Lacrosse League	2006–2008	
Chicago Skyliners	Basketball	American Basketball Association	2000–2001	Moved to Nevada and became the Las Vegas Slam
Chicago Slaughter	Football	Indoor Football League	2006	
Chicago Stags	Basketball	National Basketball Association	1946–1950	
Chicago Sting	Soccer	North American Soccer League (1975–1984); Major Indoor Soccer League (1984–1988)	1975–1988	
Chicago Thunder	Volleyball	United States Professional Volleyball League	2002	
Chicago Tigers	Football	American Professional Football Association	1920	
Chicago Winds	Football	World Football League	1975	
Danville Dashers	Ice hockey	Federal Prospects Hockey League	2011–2020	
Decatur Staleys	Football	National Football League (1920–1921)	1919–1920 (Decatur); 1921 (Chicago); 1922–present (Chicago Bears)	Moved to Chicago to become the Chicago Staleys and then changed their name to the Chicago Bears.
Lake County Fielders	Baseball	Northern League (2010); North American League (2011)	2010–11	
Normal CornBelters	Baseball	Frontier League	2009–2018	Moved to the Prospect League
Peoria Rivermen	Ice hockey	American Hockey League	2005–2013	Moved to Utica, New York, to become the Utica Comets.
Peoria Rivermen	Ice hockey	ECHL	1996–2005	Ownership obtained an American Hockey League franchise.
Peoria Rivermen	Ice hockey	International Hockey League	1984–1996	Moved to San Antonio, Texas, to become the San Antonio Dragons.
Peoria Pirates	Football	AF2	1999–2009	
Peoria Prancers	Ice hockey	International Hockey League	1982–1984	Became the Peoria Rivermen
Quad City Flames	Ice hockey	American Hockey League	2007–2009	Moved to Abbotsford, British Columbia, as the Abbotsford Heat
Quad City Mallards	Ice hockey	United Hockey League	1995–2007	
Quad City Mallards	Ice hockey	International Hockey League; Central Hockey League; ECHL	2009–2018	
Quad City Steamwheelers	Football	AF2	1999–2009	
Quad City Thunder	Basketball	Continental Basketball Association	1987–2001	
Rockford Lightning	Basketball	Continental Basketball Association	1986–2006	
Rockford Peaches	Baseball	All-American Girls Professional Baseball League	1943–1954	
Rockford Rampage	Soccer	Major Indoor Soccer League	2005–2012	
Rockford RiverHawks/Aviators	Baseball	Frontier League	1993–2008, 2011–2015	
Rockford Thunder	Fastpitch softball	National Pro Fastpitch	2007–2009	
Schaumburg Flyers	Baseball	Northern League	1993–2010	
Southern Illinois Miners	Baseball	Frontier League	2007–2021	
Tri-Cities Blackhawks	Basketball	National Basketball League	1946−1951	The team played 13 games as the Buffalo Bison during the 1946–47 season before moving to Moline, Illinois. Moved to Milwaukee and became the Milwaukee Hawks (1951–1955), moved again to St. Louis, Missouri (1955–1968), then moved once more and are now the Atlanta Hawks (1968–Present). They are the only professional sports team to have played in five cities.
Vermilion County Bobcats	Ice hockey	Southern Professional Hockey League	2021−2023	The Bobcats ceased operations in mid-season on February 9, 2023.

== See also ==
- List of developmental and minor sports leagues
- Professional sports leagues in the United States
- Sports in the United States
