= 2027 in Illinois =

- Decades: 2000s; 2010s; 2020s
- See also: History of Illinois; Historical outline of Illinois; List of years in Illinois; 2027 in the United States

The following is a list of events of the year 2027 in Illinois.

== Events ==
=== Planned or predicted ===
- April 6 - 2027 Chicago mayoral election
- July 13 - 2027 Major League Baseball All-Star Game
