= 2023 in Illinois =

- Decades: 2000s; 2010s; 2020s
- See also: History of Illinois; Historical outline of Illinois; List of years in Illinois; 2023 in the United States

The following is a list of events of the year 2023 in Illinois.

== Incumbents ==
=== State government ===
- Governor: J. B. Pritzker (D)

== Events ==
- January 31 – Governor J. B. Pritzker announces that the state will end its COVID-19 emergency proclamation after three years, beginning on May 11.
- March 31 – Belvidere Apollo Theatre collapse: One person is killed, and 28 others are injured, when a tornado causes the roof of the Apollo Theatre in Belvidere to collapse during a concert.
- April 1 – Tornado outbreak of March 31 – April 1, 2023: The toll from a tornado outbreak rises to 32 people dead and at least 90 injuries, especially in the states of Arkansas and Illinois.
- May 1 – At least six people are killed, and 30 others are injured in Illinois after a dust storm causes a crash involving 70 to 90 vehicles on Interstate 55.
- June 18 – A person is killed and 22 more injured during a mass shooting at a Juneteenth celebration in Willowbrook.
- July 8 – Four people are killed and five are injured in a series of shootings in Chicago.
- July 12 –
  - A series of tornadoes strike Chicago, prompting complete ground stops at O'Hare and Midway International Airports.
  - Three people are killed and 14 others are injured when a Greyhound passenger bus crashes into three parked trucks at a rest area off Interstate 70 in Madison County.
- July 23 – Six people are killed and 20 others are injured in shootings across Chicago.
- July 30 – One person is killed and eight others are critically injured in a mass shooting in the West Side of Chicago.
- September 29 – Five people are killed and five more are hospitalized as a semi truck carrying a toxic substance turns over near Teutopolis, causing evacuations.
- October 15 – Murder of Wadea al-Fayoume: A man kills a 6-year-old Palestinian Muslim boy and seriously injures his mother during a stabbing attack in Plainfield Township. The perpetrator, who was the victims' landlord, states he was motivated by the ongoing Gaza war.
- October 25 – A man is charged with hate crimes after being accused of pepper spraying pro-Palestine protesters that gathered near an Israel solidarity event at a banquet hall in northern Chicago.
- November 16 – Twenty-three people are injured when a Chicago "L" commuter train crashes into snow removal equipment in Chicago.

== See also ==
- 2023 in the United States
