= Illinois Labor History Society =

American nonprofit educational organization

- Formation: 1969
- Type: nonprofit educational organization
- Purpose: Preservation and study of labor history in Illinois
- Members: Academics, unionists, labor historians, and interested individuals
- Website: http://www.illinoislaborhistory.org/
- Remarks: Holds the deed to the Haymarket Martyrs' Monument

The Illinois Labor History Society (ILHS) is a nonprofit educational organization founded in 1969. It is a voluntary organization composed of academics, unionists, and persons interested in labor history. It was formed "To encourage the preservation and study of labor history in the Illinois region, and to arouse public interest in the profound significance of the past to the present."

Since the 1970s, the Society has held the deed to the Haymarket Martyrs' Monument, and been responsible for its maintenance and restoration.

== Culture and impact ==
The Illinois Labor History Society occasionally holds events promoting activism in which certain individuals are honored for their contributions. The most recently held and documented event took place on November 22, 2024, in Chicago.

Aside from its own events, the organization also participates in events with other groups. On the 125th anniversary of the Haymarket Affair, the ILHS celebrated with the Chicago Federation of Labor and the Illinois AFL-CIO federation. In 2009, it gave tribute to the American Federation of Musicians and leader James Petrillo through a concert.

The organization holds walking tours of Chicago centered on labor history.

ILHS also has a magazine, which publishes news on events and anniversaries. In winter of 2025, it noted the 100th anniversary of the Brotherhood of Sleeping Car Porters.

== Membership ==
Notable former members include:

- Leslie "Les" Orear, co-founder of the ILHS, newspaper editor, and organizer for the United Packinghouse Workers of America
- William J. Adelman, co-founder and former vice president of the ILHS as well as professor at the University of Illinois at Chicago

Current members include:

- Larry Spivack, president of the ILHS since 2006 and tour leader
- Debby Pope, first female vice president of the ILHS and representative of District 2B of the Chicago Public Schools school board
- Don Villar, ILHS Board of Trustees member and secretary-treasurer of the Chicago Federation of Labor

Inductees include:

- Harold Washington, the first African-American mayor of Chicago, who served from 1983 until 1987
- Jesse White, former Illinois Secretary of State
- Eric Dean, former president of the International Association of Bridge, Structural, Ornamental, and Reinforcing Iron Workers
- Edward M. Smith, labor leader and former Vice-President of Laborers' International Union of North America Local 773
- Lonnie Stephenson, International President of International Brotherhood of Electrical Workers

== See also ==
- List of historical sites related to the Illinois labor movement
- Wisconsin Labor History Society
- Illinois State Historical Society
