= WLHS (disambiguation) =

WLHS is a radio station (89.9 FM) licensed to West Chester, Ohio, United States.

WLHS may also refer to:

== Schools ==
- West Lafayette Junior-Senior High School, in West Lafayette, Indiana, United States
- West Laurens High School, in Dexter, Georgia, United States
- West Leeds High School, in Armley, Leeds, West Yorkshire, England
- West Lincoln High School, in Lincoln County, North Carolina, United States
- West Linn High School, in West Linn, Oregon, United States
- West Lutheran High School, in Plymouth, Minnesota, United States
- Whitmore Lake High School, in Whitmore Lake, Michigan, United States
- Wilde Lake High School, in Columbia, Maryland, United States
- Wisconsin Labor History Society of Milwaukee, Wisconsin, USA
- Wisconsin Lutheran High School, in Milwaukee, Wisconsin, United States
- Wu-Ling Senior High School, in Taoyuan City, Taiwan

== Other ==
- Wisconsin Labor History Society
