= 2022 in Illinois =

- Decades: 2000s; 2010s; 2020s
- See also: History of Illinois; Historical outline of Illinois; List of years in Illinois; 2022 in the United States

The following is a list of events of the year 2022 in Illinois.

== Incumbents ==
- Governor: J. B. Pritzker (D)
- Lieutenant governor: Juliana Stratton (D)
- Attorney general: Kwame Raoul (D)
- Secretary of State: Alexi Giannoulias (D)
- Comptroller: Susana Mendoza (D)
- Treasurer: Mike Frerichs (D)

== Sports ==
- 2022 Chicago Bears season
- 2021–22 Chicago Blackhawks season
- 2022–23 Chicago Blackhawks season
- 2021–22 Chicago Bulls season
- 2022–23 Chicago Bulls season
- 2022 Chicago Marathon
- 2022 Chicago White Sox season
- 2022 WNBA All-Star Game
- All Out (2022)
- Chicago Hounds (rugby union) established
- Chicago Tigers (cricket) established
- Emergence (2022)
- Hell in a Cell (2022)
- LIV Golf Chicago
- Windy City Riot
- Women's Wrestling Army established

== Events ==
- January 5 - Deidre Silas, a Division of Children and Family Services child protection specialist, is stabbed and killed during a home visit in Thayer.
- February 28 - Governor J.B. Pritzker lifts the indoor mask mandate for Illinois residents.
- April 1 - AMITA Health splits up with AdventHealth and Ascension rebranding their hospitals.
- May 19 - Magnificent Mile shooting: A mass shooting occurred in Chicago's Magnificent Mile shopping district, killing 2 and injuring 8.
- June 2 - AIDS Garden Chicago opened to the public.
- June 14 - A new flag for Cook County was adopted.
- July 4 - Highland Park parade shooting: during an Independence Day parade in Highland Park, 21-year-old Robert Eugene Crimo III shot into the parade, killing 7 and wounding 48.
- July 7 - Lisa Holder White is sworn in as the first black woman to serve on the Illinois Supreme Court.
- July 18 - Santa Khan was murdered by her husband after she shared her divorce experience on TikTok. He then shot himself when police arrived on scene.
- July 31 - One teenager was killed and three others injured in a shooting at the end of a graduation party at a brewpub in Decatur.
- August 2 - Parts of central Illinois received very heavy rainfall and numerous counties were impacted by flooding, including the cities of Decatur, Dawson, Spaulding, and Barclay.
- October 23 - Five men were shot, three fatally, when gunfire erupted at an intersection taken over by a drag-racing caravan of more than 100 cars in the Brighton Park neighborhood.
- October 31 - 14 people were shot, one fatally, in a drive-by shooting in the East Garfield Park neighborhood during a vigil balloon release.
- November 26 - Four people were shot, two fatally, just after midnight in the West Pullman neighborhood in the south side.
- December 4 - Five teenagers were shot inside a home in Zion.
- December 11 - Three adults were killed and one wounded at a birthday party inside Vera Lounge in Portage Park in the northwest side.
- December 16 - Four students were shot, two fatally, outside Benito Juarez Community Academy in the Pilsen neighborhood in the west side.

== See also ==
- 2022 in the United States
