= 2026 in Illinois =

- Decades: 2000s; 2010s; 2020s
- See also: History of Illinois; Historical outline of Illinois; List of years in Illinois; 2026 in the United States

The following is a list of events of the year 2026 in Illinois.

== Incumbents ==
=== State government ===
- Governor: J. B. Pritzker (D)

== Events ==
=== January ===
- January 6 – The Department of Health and Human Services announces it is halting $10 billion in social service programs to Illinois and four other Democratic states.

=== March ===
- March 23 – Immigration and Customs Enforcement agents are deployed to 14 airports nationwide, including O'Hare International Airport.

=== April ===
- April 25 – A Chicago Police officer is killed and another injured in a shooting at the Endeavor Swedish Hospital. The suspect, a man who was in police custody, flees the scene but is later apprehended.

=== May ===
- May 20 – A married couple and two of their foster children are killed in a suspected arson at their home in West Englewood, Chicago. Their two other foster children are injured.

=== June ===
- June 4 – The Chicago Bears board of directors vote in favor of building a new stadium for the team in Hammond, Indiana.
- June 9 – A burning cross is left in Grant Park in Chicago. A 21-year-old man is later arrested.
- June 19
  - The Barack Obama Presidential Center opens in Chicago.
  - 12 people are injured in a drive-by shooting on the South Side of Chicago.
- June 21 – The Chicago Hounds beat the California Legion 35–17 to win the 2026 Major League Rugby final. It is their first championship and finishes an undefeated season.

=== July ===
- July 2 – Douglas DePodesta, head of the Chicago FBI office, abruptly resigns.
- July 12 – Five family members are fatally shot across three different locations in East St. Louis. A 15-year-old relative and her 16-year-old boyfriend are charged with the murders.

=== August ===
- August 1 – The Women's Pro Baseball League (WPBL) holds its first match at Robin Roberts Stadium in Springfield, in which the Los Angeles Queens beat the New York Heights 10–8. The stadium serves as the field for all four teams in the WPBL during its inaugural season.
- August 6 – The remains of 56 people are found improperly stored at a Chicago funeral home.
- August 23 – Sean Grayson, the Sangamon County Sheriff's deputy convicted of murdering Sonya Massey at her home in 2024, dies in prison.

=== September ===
- September 20 – ICE agents beat an American citizen in Evanston after mistaking him for a fugitive.

=== October ===
- October 11 – A 19-year-old white supremacist is arrested for allegedly attempting to commit a mass shooting at a Hindu temple in Aurora. According to police, the man arrived in the temple's parking lot and attempted to shoot Indian people, but his rifle jammed. He is arrested after returning home and telling a coworker that his gun jammed; the coworker reports him to police. Representative Raja Krishnamoorthi is at the temple during the attempted shooting.
- October 20 – A man is arrested for firing shots outside the Kluczynski Federal Building. The suspect is arrested at the scene.
- October 30 – Pope Leo XIV, an American citizen registered to vote in Illinois, votes by mail ballot, the first time a pope has done so.

=== November ===
- November 1 – A 19-year-old woman is killed and seven people are injured in a shooting near the Illinois Wesleyan University campus in Bloomington.
- November 3:
  - 2026 Illinois Senate election
  - 2026 Illinois Attorney General election
  - 2026 Illinois State Comptroller election
  - 2026 Illinois gubernatorial election: JB Pritzker wins reelection, beating former State Senator Darren Bailey.
  - 2026 Illinois House of Representatives election
  - 2026 Illinois Secretary of State election
  - 2026 Illinois State Treasurer election
  - 2026 United States House of Representatives elections in Illinois
- November 13 – A bomb is discovered at an ethanol plant in Peoria, prompting evacuations in a one-mile radius.

== Deaths ==
- October 3: Dennis Hastert, 84, former Speaker of the House from Illinois-14 and admitted sexual abuser.

== See also ==
- 2026 in the United States
