= 2021 in Illinois =

- Decades: 2000s; 2010s; 2020s
- See also: History of Illinois; Historical outline of Illinois; List of years in Illinois; 2021 in the United States

The following is a list of events of the year 2021 in Illinois

== Incumbents ==
- Governor: J. B. Pritzker (D)
- Lieutenant governor: Juliana Stratton (D)
- Attorney general: Kwame Raoul (D)
- Secretary of State: Jesse White (D)
- Comptroller: Susana Mendoza (D)
- Treasurer: Mike Frerichs (D)

== Sports ==
- 2021 Chicago Bears season
- 2021 Chicago Cubs season
- 2021–22 Chicago Blackhawks season
- 2020–21 Chicago Bulls season
- 2021–22 Chicago Bulls season
- 2021 Chicago White Sox season
- 2021 Chicago Marathon
- All Out (2021)
- AEW The First Dance
- Chicago Women's Open

== Events ==
- January 9 - Jason Nightengale shot and killed five people during a shooting spree that began on Chicago's South Side and ended in Evanston.
- March 29 - Adam Toledo was shot and killed by Chicago Police Department officer Eric Stillman in the Little Village neighborhood on the West Side of Chicago.
- March 31 - Anthony Alvarez, was shot and killed by a Chicago Police Department officer in the Portage Park neighborhood on the Northwest Side of Chicago.
- June 14 - A maintenance accident at the Chemtool Incorporated manufacturing plant in Rockton triggered a chemical fire that lasted four days and injured two emergency workers.
- August 31 - A mass shooting occurred at a mobile home park in Normal that left three people dead and three more injured.
- November 9 - Zheng Shaoxiong was fatally shot by Alton Spann in Hyde Park.
- December 10 - An EF3 tornado touched down near Pontoon Beach and tracked north towards Edwardsville. It hit an Amazon warehouse, killing 6 and injuring 1.

== See also ==
- 2021 in the United States
