= Wisconsin Workers Memorial =

Public memorial in Milwaukee, Wisconsin

- Artists: Terese Agnew and Mary Zebell
- Year: 1995
- Type: Gazebo, plantings, chains and 21 plaques
- Location: E. Michigan St. between N. 3rd St. and N. 4th St., Milwaukee; 43°2′13.38″N 87°54′55.186″W

The Wisconsin Workers Memorial is a public artwork by American artists Terese Agnew and Mary Zebell located in Zeidler Park, which is in downtown Milwaukee, Wisconsin, United States. The artwork, created in 1995, takes the whole park as its theme, and includes a gazebo in the middle of the park with handles of tools and grills forming the ornamental grillwork. There are also decorative chains around the park spelling out popular labor slogans, as well as graphic panels explaining significant moments in Wisconsin's labor history.

== Description ==
Agnew and Zebells' Wisconsin Workers Memorial makes use of the entire Zeidler Park, integrating landscape and sculpture to create the final work. The designers kept in mind the park's character when creating the memorial. They believed that the park resembled a 19th-century village green, and thus created a gazebo that resembles a bandstand as the symbol of a democratic gathering place. The gazebo, situated in the middle of the park, is decorated with salvaged gears and tools of the modern workplace. There is a huge clock inside the edifice, referencing the time spent at work as well as the fight for the eight-hour workday. The bandstand is accessible by wheelchair ramps, which serve as a useful reminder of workers injured on the job. Paths lined with ornamental chains and bollards lead from the sidewalk up to the structure. The chains display popular labor slogans and tell the story of Milwaukee's labor history from 1800 to the present through graphic panels stating important historical facts. The memorial is designed to commemorate the workers who have faced dangers and hazards on their job, as well as the struggles to overcome these hazards, thus the emphasis on Wisconsin labor history. "We want to find personal stories and worker experiences that illustrate milestones in the history of working men and women,,' said Zebell, a landscape architect, and Agnew, a public sculptor. 'Wisconsin is so important nationally for being a first in legislature such as Workers Compensation."

The Wisconsin Workers Memorial has been a collaboration between the Milwaukee Labor Council and the Wisconsin Labor History Society. Terese Agnew and Mary Zebell's design was chosen in a competition sponsored by the Milwaukee County Labor Council and the Milwaukee County Parks Design and Review Committee.

== Information ==
The gazebo/bandstand located in the middle of the park is the focal point of the memorial. It commemorates Wisconsin workers' tools, while emphasizing the struggles encountered by the laborers. The fabricating of all the ornamental grillwork, which is composed of salvaged gears, was done by skilled union members. A drive was held in order to raise funds to pay for the artwork.

The Wisconsin Workers Memorial was dedicated on April 28, 1995. The Wisconsin Labor Society was the original sponsor for the project, but it is currently managed by the Milwaukee County Labor Council. Each year the site is used as a gathering point for Workers Memorial Day, which is held on April 28 to honor workers who have been killed or injured on the job. It is also the staging point for Milwaukee's annual Labor Parade on Labor Day.

== Artist ==
Terese Agnew was born in Milwaukee, Wisconsin in 1959. Her parents encouraged her to pursue art, while her stepfather, who was a labor organizer, introduced her to the laborers' struggles worldwide. This later became a central theme in Agnew's work. She attended the University of Wisconsin–Milwaukee from 1981 to 1984 where she studied painting and sculpture. Agnew began her career as a public sculptor, creating works such as the Wisconsin Workers Memorial and her 35 concrete tree stumps at the Sharon Lynne Wilson Center for the Arts in Brookfield, Wisconsin. She became notorious when in 1985 she wrapped a "huge fiberglass sculpture of a dragon around a Gothic Revival water tower on the east side of Milwaukee- an intervention that required months of legal wrangling but was only a five day installation." The artist also started making quilts in 1990 centering, just as her sculpture, on themes of freedom, human dignity and man's role in nature. She is well known for engaging with public space and communities, as well as devoting as much time and effort as is necessary to achieve the desired aesthetic effect. Terese Agnew was a 2004 recipient of a Greater Milwaukee Foundation's Mary L. Nohl Fund Fellowship for Individual Artists in the established category.

Landscape architect Mary Zebell grew up in Milwaukee, Wisconsin. She obtained her Bachelor of Fine Arts from the University of Wisconsin-Milwaukee in 1980. Zebell then proceeded to obtain her Masters of Landscape Architecture from Cornell University. She currently resides in Ithaca, New York where she works as an independent architecture and planning professional.

== See also ==
- Rockmen Guardians
- Letter Carriers' Monument
