= Wisconsin Labor History Society =

- Abbreviation: WLHS
- Formation: 1981
- Field: Labor history
- President: Steven Cupery
- Vice President: Laurie Wermter
- Treasurer: Robin Lundgren
- Board of directors: Christopher F. Burkley, Paul Cigler Jr., Judith Gatlin, Jessica Gibson, Sergio Gonzalez, Jillian Marie Jacklin, Ginger Jefferson, Anita Johnson, Elizabeth Jozwiak, Harvey Kaye, David Newby, Joanne Ricca, Jon Shelton, Hugh Sloan, Luz Sosa
- Key people: Kenneth Germanson, Judith Burnick
- Main organ: Wisconsin Labor History Society Newsletter (quarterly)
- Website: www.wisconsinlaborhistory.org

The Wisconsin Labor History Society (WLHS), founded in 1981, is a non-profit association based in Milwaukee, Wisconsin, to research and inform academics, workers, and general public on the labor history in the US state of Wisconsin. It commemorates the Bay View Tragedy of May 5, 1886, when state militia opened fire and killed eight of 1,500 workers marching during a national strike for an 8-hour work-day.

== Public sponsorship ==
WLHS sponsors the "Struggle for Justice" photo exhibit about farm workers' organizing in the 1960s in Wisconsin.

WLHS participates in a network of labor history organizations in the US and Canada including Illinois Labor History Society and the Pacific Northwest Labor History Association and holds joint meetings with them.

WLHS co-sponsors the Wisconsin Workers Memorial located in Zeidler Union Square Park in Milwaukee.

== Publications ==
- Quarterly printed newsletter reports on events in labor history and WLHS activities
- Monthly online newsletter
- Books, curricula, videos and other materials on labor history

== Conferences ==
WHLS sponsors an annual conference to highlight significant events in Wisconsin labor history. The first annual conference was held on May 1, 1982, at the Historic Turner's Hall. Speakers are often university members, historians, or prominent figures in the field; for example, in 1982, two labor historians Rick Pifer and Steve Meyer spoke, and in 2026, the editor of The Nation magazine, John Nichols, as well as Organizing Director of the Minnesota AFL-CIO, Todd Dalhstrom, spoke.

WLHS co-sponsors an annual Bay View Tragedy commemoration to honor workers killed in 1886 march during a national strike for an eight-hour work-day.

== Grants, awards ==
WLHS promotes labor studies in colleges and universities:

- Daitsman Awards: special grants for labor history projects
- Zeidler Academic Award: annual award to graduate and undergraduate college students for original research into Wisconsin labor and working-class history

WLHS promotes labor studies in high and middle schools, including the Labor History Essay Contest, which offers cash awards to Wisconsin high school students.

- National History Day Contest: Sponsors awards for labor history projects by Wisconsin middle and high school students

WLHS also provides a Lifetime Achievement Award to one recipient annually. It is given to an individual determined to have a specific background and history of voluntary leadership.

== Archives ==
WLHS has a strong relationship with the Wisconsin Historical Society (WHS), which regularly refers labor-related inquiries to WLHS and posts WLHS news and events. WHS also maintains a labor collection.

The WLHS archive includes histories of local labor unions and councils, buttons and badges, photos, and meeting minutes. As of 2018, WLHS acquired a project to map important Wisconsin labor sites.

Although not archived on the WLHS website directly, the website for WORT-FM - a radio station located in Madison - has an archive of a radio segment in which a member of the WLHS, Roger Bybee, was interviewed on the 1954-61 Kohler Strike.

== See also ==
- Labor history of the United States
- Bay View Massacre
- Wisconsin Workers Memorial
- Illinois Labor History Society
- Labor and Working-Class History Association
- List of historical societies in Wisconsin
