= 2024 in Illinois =

- Decades: 2000s; 2010s; 2020s
- See also: History of Illinois; Historical outline of Illinois; List of years in Illinois; 2024 in the United States

The following is a list of events of the year 2024 in Illinois.

== Incumbents ==
=== State government ===
- Governor: J. B. Pritzker (D)

== Events ==
- January 21 – 2024 Joliet shootings: A man commits a spree shooting in three locations in Illinois killing eight people and injuring one other before committing suicide a day later after he was confronted by police.
- February 27 – A tornado hits Palatine, and Inverness.
- March 19 –
  - The Democratic Party holds presidential nominating contests in Illinois.
  - The Republican Party holds presidential nominating contests in Illinois.
- March 27 – Four people are killed and seven others are injured during a stabbing spree in Rockford.
- May 4 – Police arrest 68 protesters who attempt to set up a pro-Palestinian encampment outside the Art Institute of Chicago.
- July 4th weekend – Across the extended July 4th weekend, 11 people are killed and 55 others injured in unrelated Chicago shootings.
- July 6 – A Sangamon County Sheriff's deputy Sean Grayson fatally shoots unarmed Sonya Massey at her home near Springfield. Grayson is fired and later charged with first-degree murder.
- July 16 – Heavy rainfall across the Midwestern United States causes a dam failure in Washington County, Illinois, prompting an immediate evacuation order in the nearby city of Nashville.
- August 20 – Several pro-Palestinian demonstrators are arrested after protestors clashed with police near the Israeli consulate in Chicago, on the second night of the Democratic National Convention.
- September 2 –Four people are killed in a mass shooting targeting homeless people on a Chicago Transit Authority train in Forest Park.

== See also ==
- 2024 in the United States
