= List of historical sites related to the Illinois labor movement =

The following are historic points of labor history in the state of Illinois:

== Downstate labor history sites ==
=== Beckemeyer Coal Miners Monument ===
Monument dedicated to Joseph Koch, who along with eight other local miners died in the 1947 Centralia mine disaster. Plaque Reads: Centralia Coal Company Mine No 5 Disaster

On March 25, 1947, a violent explosion struck Centralia coal company mine number 5 located in Wamac, Illinois. By March 29, it was confirmed that the explosion, combined with the subsequent release of poisonous gas, had taken the lives of 111 of the 142 men working in the mine at the time of the accident.

This statue is dedicated to the memory of Joseph Koch Sr. and the other Beckemeyer miners who lost their lives in the explosion. Other victims include: Rodrigo Alvarez, Andrew Farley, Luther Frazier, John Mazeka, Joseph Peiler, John Placek, Anton Skrobul, Alfred Stevens.

=== Belleville Labor and Industry Museum ===
The museum is located in 160-year-old former cigar factory at 123 North Church Street in Belleville, Illinois. It contains a collection of photographs, documents and patents relating to labor and industry in the city. The museum is open on Saturdays from 10-4 or by appointment.

=== George Franklin Bilyeu Monument ===
Located in Taylorville, Illinois, and erected in memory of George Franklin Bilyeu (1854–1898) who was killed in Virden, Illinois in 1898 during a United Mine Workers of America confrontation with armed guards who were bringing strike breakers into the Virden mine. The monument is located at the Oak Hill Cemetery, 820 S. Cherokee St., Taylorville, Illinois.

=== Bloomington Workers' Memorial Monument ===
This monument is located in White Oak Park. The park, built around a quarry, has 100 trees that were donated by labor unions, to honor local asbestos workers and others who died of work-related accidents and disabilities. It also includes a large flag pole, built from steam locomotive bearings, that was moved to the site by local unions in 1996. The flag pole was fabricated in 1942 by Chicago & Alton Railroad Shops employees, as a symbol of war-time patriotism. The Bloomington Normal Trades & Labor Assembly, AFL–CIO, hosts a ceremony each Workers' Memorial Day April 28.

=== Bloomington labor history mural ===
A 12-foot-tall by 18-foot-wide labor history mural adorns the inside of Laborers Local 362's old hall, 2005 Cabintown Road, Bloomington, Illinois. The mural depicts local labor history, including the Chicago & Alton Railroad shops and the 1922 Shops workers' strike; a 1917 visit by Mary Harris "Mother" Jones in supporting of striking streetcar workers; a 1937 strike at the Beich Candy Company and the 1978 Normal Fire Fighters' strike. The mural was painted by Kari Sandhaas from 1984 to 1986.

=== Bloomington & Normal bike trails ===
Bloomington and Normal have an extensive bike trail system, mostly on former railroad right of way. On these trails are historic markers, some concerning local industries and neighborhoods. On the "Constitution Trail," which runs from East Jefferson and Robinson Streets in Bloomington north through Normal, are ten historic markers. This trail is on the former 1850s Illinois Central right-of-way. On this trail are markers detailing the railroad's construction, noting a restored wooden bridge carrying Virginia Street in Normal over the trail, plus 19th century horse breeding and nursery businesses in Normal. Another east–west trail in Bloomington, built along the Peoria & Eastern (New York Central system) right of way, runs from East Lincoln and South Clayton Streets in Bloomington north and then west. It follows the currently operative Norfolk Southern Railway right of way. This trail has markers noting the local meat packing industry (Oakland Avenue), warehouse district (under South Madison Street overpass), the 1917 Streetcar strike , which featured Mary Harris "Mother" Jones (South Roosevelt Street), a German immigrant neighborhood (Mason Street) and the Union Depot (west of Alton Depot Park at South Western and West Front Street).

=== Bloomington Labor leaders ===
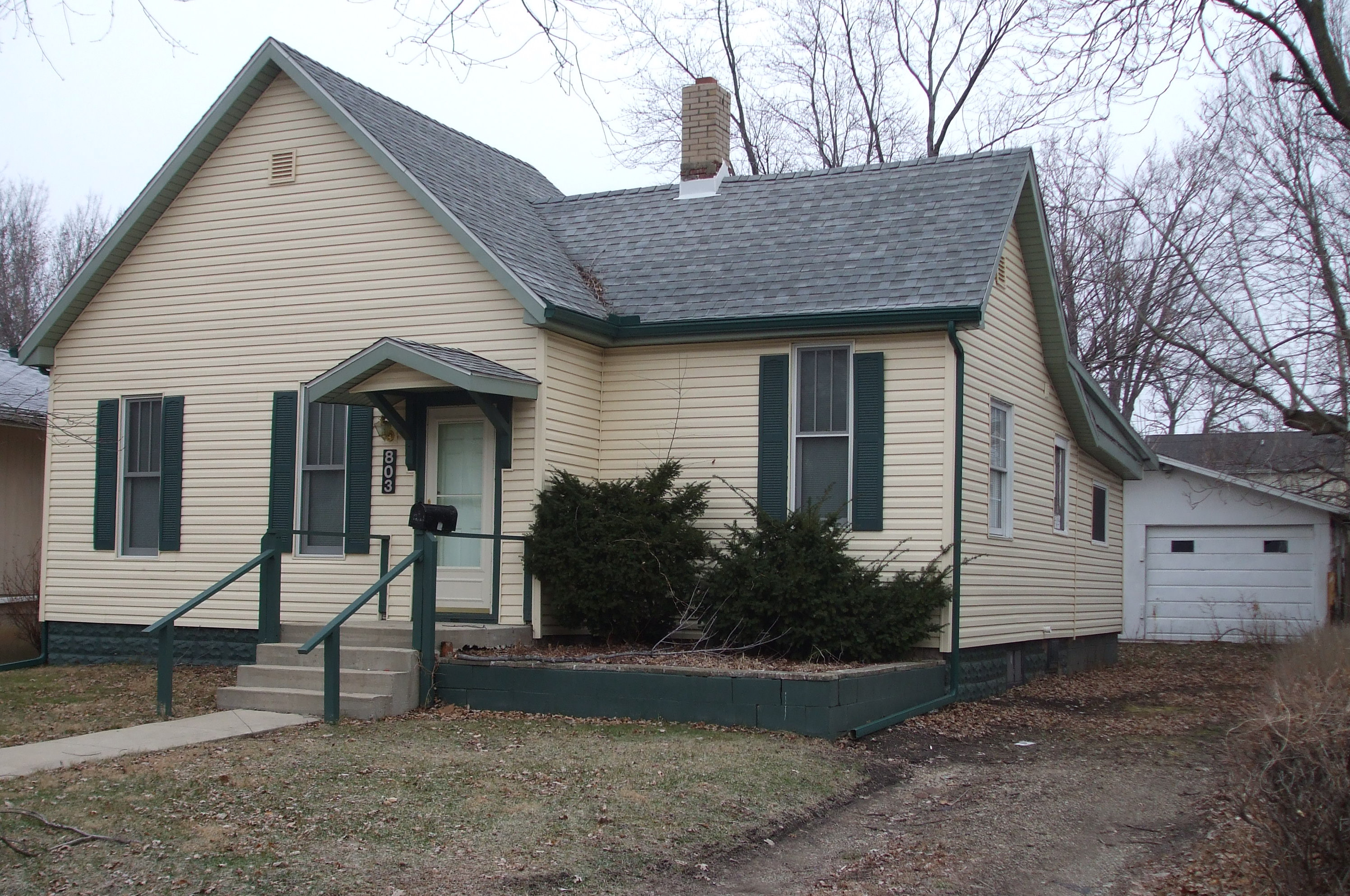
1860s childhood home of P.H. Morrissey, Brotherhood of Railroad Trainmen early 1900s leader. The home is located at 803 W. Monroe St., Bloomington, Illinois.

Patrick H. Morrissey (1862–1916) headed the Brotherhood of Railroad Trainmen from 1895 to 1909. The son of Chicago & Alton Railroad section foreman John Morrissey and his wife Mary, Morrissey grew up on Bloomington's west side near the railroad yards. He completed a rare event for a 19th-century working class child – he was one of 27 graduates from Bloomington High School in 1879. Morrissey worked through his schooling as a "call boy," summoning railroaders from their homes when it was time for their run. After graduation he followed his dad to the railroad, working as a clerk, brakeman and conductor.

In 1883, trainmen on the Delaware & Hudson Railroad formed the Brotherhood of Railroad Brakeman, the Brotherhood of Railroad Trainmen after 1890. In 1885 Bloomington workers organized a lodge and Morrissey was a charter member. That year his fellow workers elected young Morrissey to represent them at the union's Burlington, Iowa convention. He caught the eye of S.E. Wilkinson, the new organization's Grand Master, and Morrissey became the BRT's clerk, editing the union's "Journal."

In 1889, Morrissey was elected Vice-Grand Master, traveling the country helping establish new lodges. The financial downturn of the 1890s and the Pullman strike defeat left the BRT penniless and dwindling. Wilkinson retired and in 1895 Morrissey was elected BRT Grand Master. The organization had less than 10,000 members and was $105,000 in debt. Morrissey saved the organization, strategically uniting with the Order of Railway Conductors. Following the Pullman strike all the operating brotherhoods attempted cooperative efforts, but this fell apart within three years. In 1902 the Conductors and Trainmen confronted the western railroads together, winning a contract which they replicated in other regions. The key strategic move the two organizations made was confronting railroads regionally, rather than individually, thus thwarting the companies' attempts to play workers on one line against another. Although the railway brotherhoods tended to be conservative and often aloof from other unions, Samuel Gompers noted Morrissey as one of 20 "outstanding fellows" who answered his pleas for support for West Virginia coal miners in 1902.

When Morrissey left the BRT in 1909, it had 120,000 members, held $2 million in insurance funds and had a $1.5 million strike fund. The union also opened a home for disabled and aged trainmen in Highland Park, Illinois in 1910. He was noted for his education and as a public spokesman for the rail brotherhoods. With a varied training in railroading, in insurance, and in labor organization work.

For the next five years, Morrissey worked in Chicago for the American Association of Railway Employees and Investors, which invested union funds in rail companies. In 1914, he became a special assistant to the president of the Chicago, Burlington and Quincy Railroad. Two years later he was diagnosed with a "nervous breakdown," which was actually a brain tumor. He died at age 54 on November 25, 1916 and is buried in Galesburg, Illinois.

Morrissey's brothers all were politically active in local affairs and moved beyond their working-class background and the railroad. Brother Michael was elected Bloomington Police Magistrate, learned law, and served as a successful labor arbitrator and lawyer, becoming Bloomington postmaster during Democratic administrations. James Morrissey joined the Bloomington Fire Department, retiring as an assistant chief. John was on the Bloomington Election Commission. The one brother to leave town was William, who went to Denver, was active in the labor movement, wrote for the Denver Post and served on the Colorado Boxing Commission.

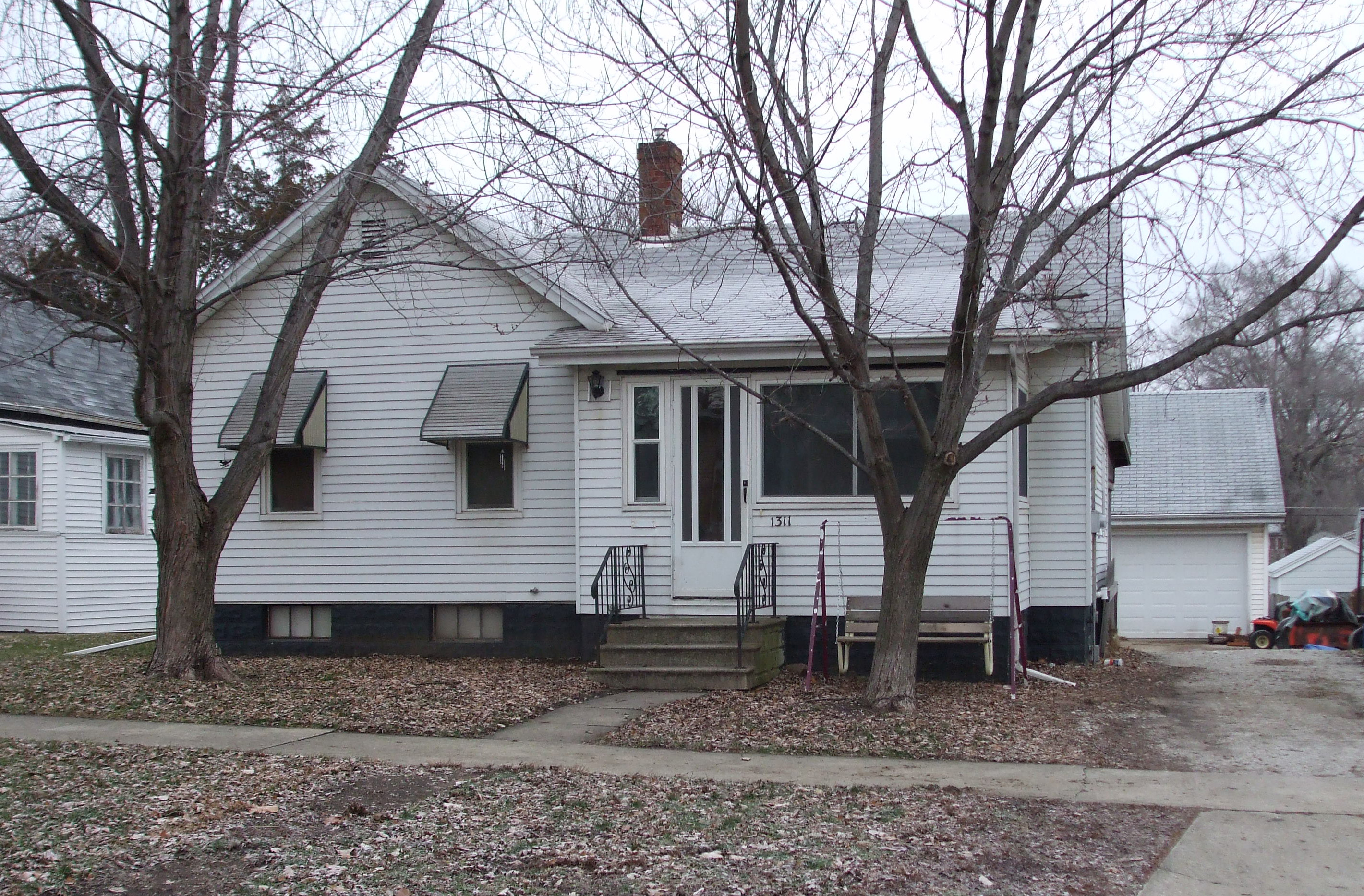
1880s Childhood home of Daniel W. Tracy, IBEW leader, located at 1311 W. Walnut Street, Bloomington, Illinois.

Daniel W. Tracy (1886–1954) was another west-side Bloomington Irish rail worker's son who achieved national leadership, as president of the International Brotherhood of Electrical Workers. New electric technology provided Tracy's road to success. After 1893 his father worked for the local street railway. Tracy completed grade school, worked briefly at the C&A shops and then began working for the street railways, occasionally listed as a laborer and later as an electrician.

Tracy last listed Bloomington as his address in 1913, migrating to the southwest. That year he joined IBEW Local 716 in Houston, working as a lineman in Texas and Oklahoma. Within three years he was business agent for two Houston locals and by 1920 was an International Vice-President for the union, representing the southwest. In 1933, with the union's membership at a record low because of the Depression, Tracy assumed the national organization's leadership, when there were 50,000 members.

By 1940, under Tracy's leadership and thanks to new legislation favorable to union organization, the IBEW had 200,000 members. A strong supporter of President Franklin D. Roosevelt, Tracy left the union in 1940 to serve as assistant Secretary of Labor under Frances Perkins. He returned to the union's presidency in 1947, served on the AFL's executive council, and led the IBEW as it grew to 360,000 members. He helped strengthen the union's apprenticeship programs and established a pension fund in 1946. A fierce anti-communist, Tracy's post-war reign was marked by tension with unions accused of being communist-led. He resigned his union presidency in 1954 and died in 1955. He's buried in Bloomington's St. Mary's Cemetery.

John Brown Lennon (1850–1923) is perhaps the most fascinating labor leader to impact Bloomington labor. Born in Lafayette County, Wisconsin on October 12, 1850, Lennon's family moved to Hannibal, Missouri within two years, where he learned the tailor's trade from his father. After some education, including seven months at Oberlin College in Ohio, Lennon moved to Denver, where he worked farming and mining before returning to the tailor's trade. He married June Allen in 1871 and they had one son. Lennon also dates his union membership from that year. He quickly became active in Colorado activities, helping organize the city's central labor council and running for mayor on a labor-socialist ticket. In August 1884 the Journeyman Tailors Union (JTU) reorganized and Lennon represented the Denver tailors. The next year 23 local unions, representing 2,481 tailors, met in convention again. Lennon was elected vice-president.

In 1886, the JTU elected Lennon general secretary, responsible for the union's affairs and editor of "The Tailor." He relocated to New York, where half the union's membership lived. The union's income that first year was $300. By 1907, the union had grown to 22,000 members in 400 local unions. Lennon also moved forward in the larger labor movement, becoming AFL treasurer in 1890. AFL President Samuel Gompers and Lennon became friends and in 1894 when the AFL president lost his post for one year to a socialist opponent, he operated from Lennon's office.

1894 almost destroyed the JTU after a disastrous New York strike. With the union's membership centered now in the Midwest, Lennon decided to relocate its national headquarters to Bloomington, setting up shop on January 1, 1896 in the Eddy Building, 427 N. Main Street. The family residence was at 614 East Mulberry Street.

Lennon quickly became active in local union affairs and helped lead the Trades & Labor Assembly, assisting and promoting local unions. Gompers came to Bloomington on June 23, 1899 to visit Lennon and addressed a labor rally that evening. Lennon took his AFL treasurer position seriously and warned the organization against over-expenditure. He also strongly supported Gompers' stances, drawing criticism from Gompers' opponents. In 1909 Lennon was the first president of the AFL's Union Label Department and helped form a Labor Press Association.

Lennon lost power in 1910, when he was defeated as JTU general secretary by Eugene Brais, a Canadian socialist. Brais publicly advocated socialism, but another pressing issue of the early 20th-century might account for Lennon's defeat—alcohol. Unlike many trade unionists, who often met and organized in neighborhood taverns, Lennon was a strict prohibitionist and temperance advocate. In a national union movement dominated by Irish Catholic surnames, Lennon was a traditional White Anglo-Saxon Protestant, active in the Masons. He wrote strident articles for national Protestant and temperance magazines, condemning strong drink.

Although no longer a national union officer, Gompers insisted on retaining Lennon as AFL treasurer, referring to him as "my minister without portfolio." In 1912 Congress established an industrial relations study to hold national hearings. Gompers appointed, to the protest of progressive groups, Lennon as his personal representative.

In 1917, Daniel Tobin of the Teamsters replaced Lennon as AFL treasurer. Although he had taken an anti-war stance in 1916, Lennon was appointed by President Woodrow Wilson to the new U.S. Department of Labor's board of mediators, a position he served on through the war years. In 1919, when Lennon was one year short of 70, his wife died. Lennon quickly remarried Barbara Eggers, a Bloomington school teacher with whom he had developed a friendship after her graduation from Bloomington High School in 1900. Barbara Lennon was an early advocate for teacher unionization in Bloomington schools.

1919 was also a politically auspicious year for Lennon. He took a stance Gompers frowned on, actively participating in forming an Illinois Labor Party. He ran for Bloomington mayor that year on a Labor Party ticket and narrowly lost election. He died in 1923 and is buried in Bloomington's Park View Cemetery, 1001 South Morris Avenue, Lot D-41, between his two wives.

=== Centralia Fairview Park ===
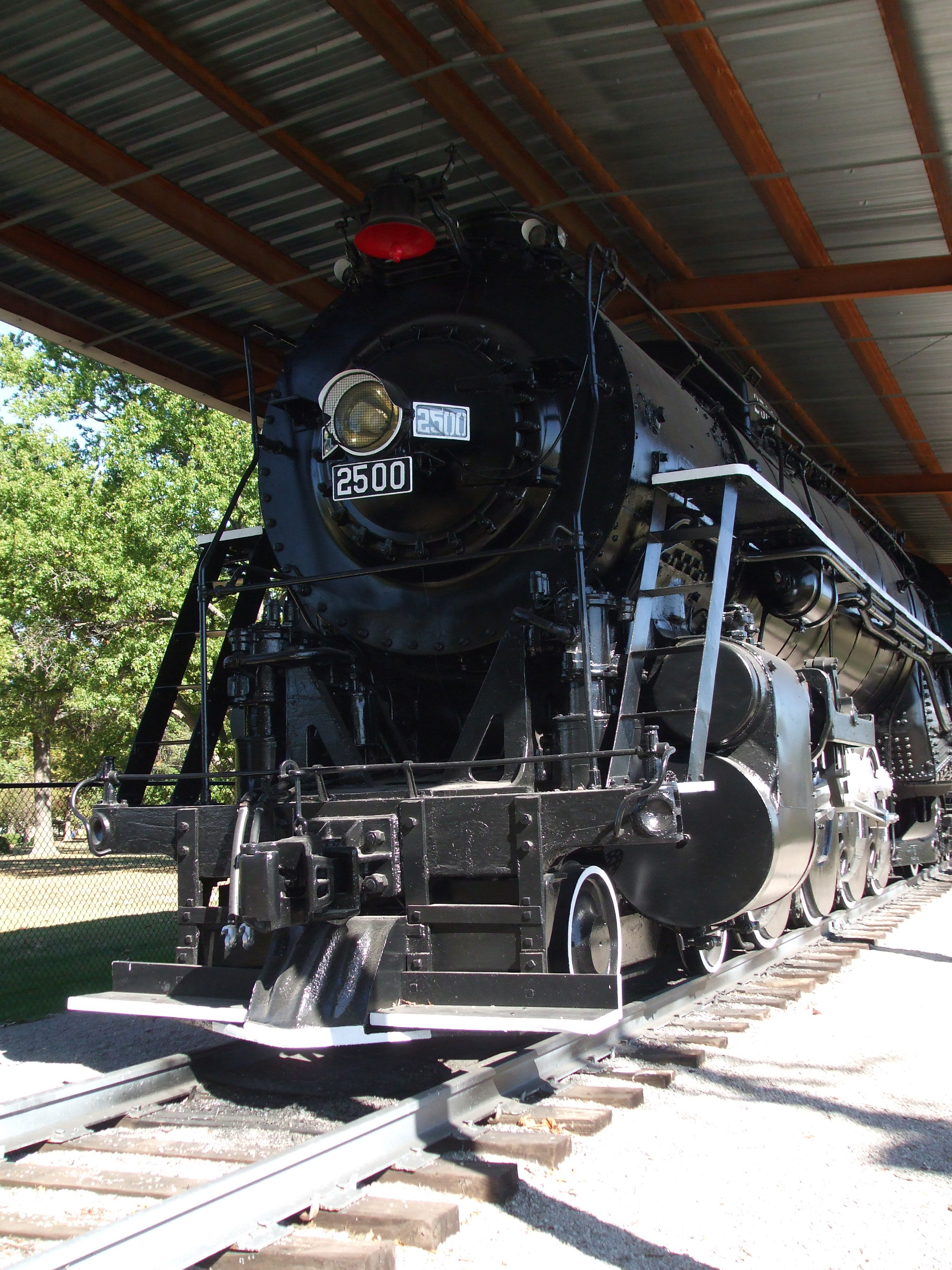
Illinois Central steam locomotive 2500 salutes the community's railroad heritage at Fairview Park.

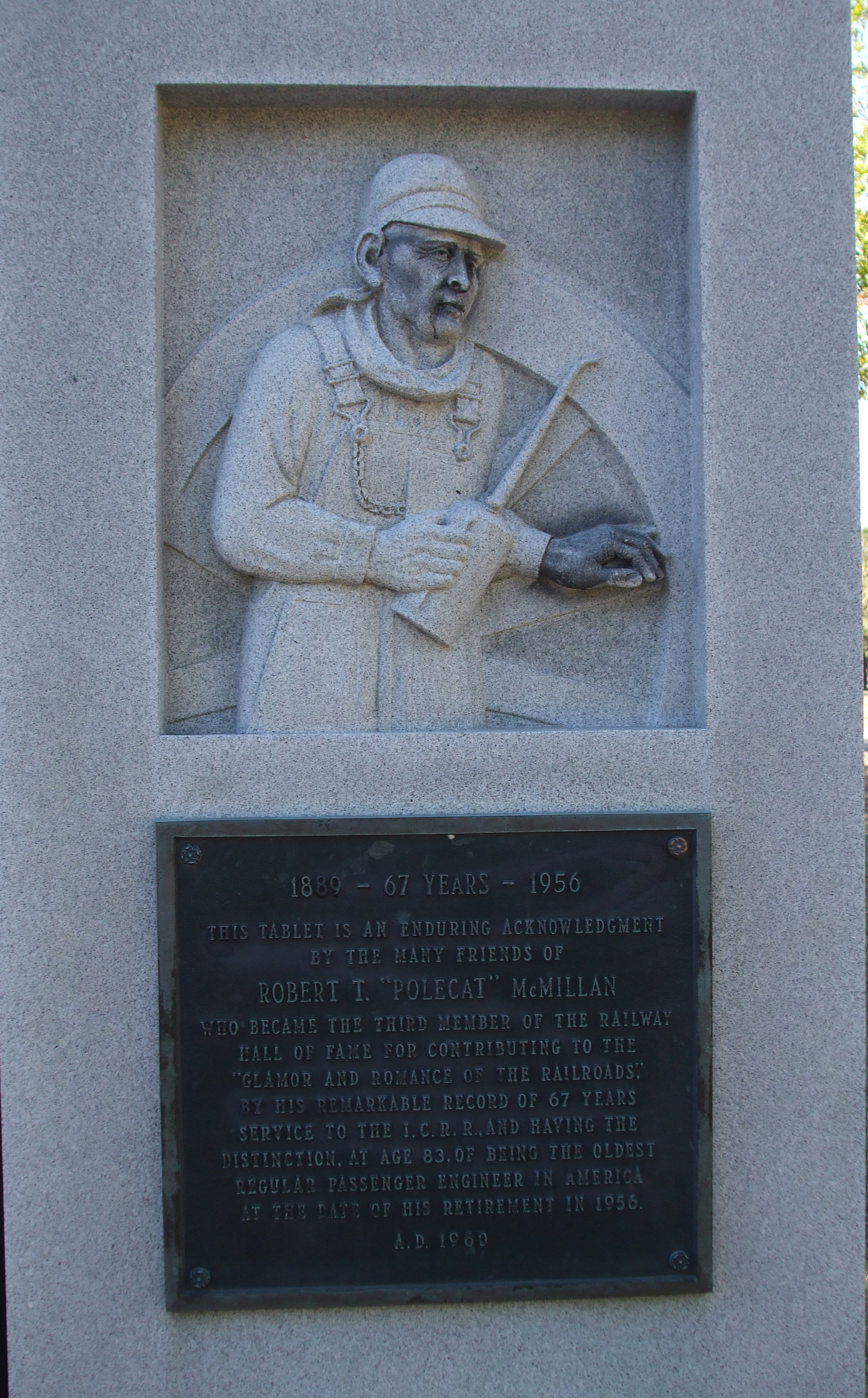
This tablet honors rail engineer Robert "Polecat" McMillan in Centralia's Fairview Park.

Located in Centralia's Fairview Park are two memorials to the area's railroad heritage. Locomotive 2500 is an Illinois Central Railroad 4-8-2 "Mountain" locomotive, one of 76 built within the railroad's Paducah, Kentucky shops between 1937 and 1943. Centralia had large car repair and building shops for the Illinois Central and a large roundhouse. Adjoining the locomotive is a tablet honoring railroad engineer Robert I. "Polecat" McMillan. McMillan retired in 1956 after 67 years of railroad service, at age 83. At that time, he was the "oldest locomotive engineer" in the United States. The tablet was erected in 1960.

=== Chicago & Alton Railroad Shops site ===
Now closed and demolished, Bloomington once was a center for railroad repair and construction by the Chicago and Alton Railroad. Located half-way between Chicago and St. Louis, with a secondary line from Bloomington to Kansas City, this central point on the railroad is where the railroad located its main shops. Here locomotives, passenger and freight cars were renovated. Once McLean County's largest employer, this railroad reached Bloomington from Springfield in 1853.

It began business in 1847 as the Alton & Sangamon Railroad, beginning construction in 1850 and reaching Springfield in 1853. In 1852 the railroad became the Chicago and Mississippi. In 1855 they located their main repair shops on Bloomington's west side, building locomotives, freight and passenger cars. Local merchants and lawyers donated land to the railroad to induce them to locate their construction and repair facilities here. The Shops eventually extended along the Railroad from Locust Street on the south to Seminary Street on the north. By 1857 the Shops had 185 employees. George Pullman came here in 1858 to build his first sleeping car. The line from Bloomington to Joliet was completed in 1856 and to Chicago in 1858. In 1861 the line became the Chicago & Alton. On November 1, 1867 a fire destroyed the Shops; Bloomington citizens again donated funds to rebuild them. A branch from Bloomington to Kansas City was completed in 1879. It terminated in Bloomington because local citizens again raised $75,000 to have the line end in Bloomington, rather than curving northward toward Washington to meet up with an existing eastern branch of the company.

These repair shops necessitated skilled craft workers: boilermakers, machinists, woodworkers, pipefitters, sheet metal workers, blacksmiths and others, employing almost 1,200 at its peak in the early 20th century. The C&A's payroll in 1905 locally was $1.2 million. In 1882 the Shops burned and the community raised $55,000 to expand and rebuild them, after the company threatened to move them to Springfield. A major fire again struck the Shops in 1908. In 1910-12 the community raised $650,000 to buy land to allow for construction of a new locomotive backshop.

In 1917, 1,200 workers from the repair shops sympathy struck in support of the workers of the Bloomington Streetcar Strike. On July 1, 1922 the workers, organized in AFL craft unions, participated in the national rail shop workers strike and the Illinois National Guard was brought in and encamped around the Shops complex. The workers returned to work in October 1922 on company terms.

In 1936, the company had 1,500 workers in Bloomington, both shop employees and operating crews, who brought in an annual payroll of almost $2 million. The C&A was absorbed by the Baltimore and Ohio Railroad in 1931, released by that company in 1942, bankrupt in 1946 and then absorbed by the Gulf, Mobile & Ohio Railroad, which quickly switched from steam to diesel power, greatly cutting employment at the Bloomington Shops. Today the former C&A line is operated by the Union Pacific Railroad.

What was the Shops complex can be viewed northward from the West Locust Street bridge or southward from the West Seminary Street bridge in Bloomington. At one time, 31 buildings were part of this complex, stretching on the west side of the railroad yards between these two bridges. Only two buildings remain. On the west side of the former complex, at the east end of Perry Street, is a brick building from the 1910 era. On the east side of the complex, at West Chestnut and North Allin Street, is the 19th Chicago & Alton freight house, built of dolomite stone quarried in the Joliet area. This structure is typical of the 19th century buildings which once filled the site. It is now used by a local printing company.

=== Champaign County Workers' Memorial Monument ===
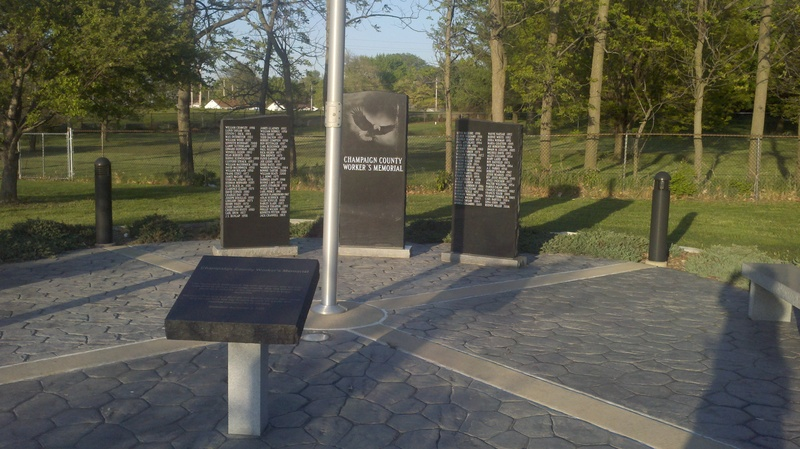
Champaign County Workers' Memorial at Dodds Park

Located in Dodds Park, on Parkland Way just west of Mattis Avenue in Champaign, Illinois, near the Olympic tribute. It consists of a circular concrete pad with three large black standing tablets, two engraved with the names of those who have died on the job in Champaign County since 1950. The memorial was dedicated on September 2, 2002.

=== Decatur Workers' Memorial Monument ===
Located at the northwest corner of the Macon County Courthouse lawn on the corner of Wood and Water streets in Decatur, Illinois. This monument is dedicated to workers who have perished due to occupational death or illness on the job. It serves as a reminder for all workers to continue the fight for safe and healthy workplaces. It was erected by Decatur Trades & Labor Assembly, AFL–CIO, and was dedicated in 2000. A ceremony is held each Workers' Memorial Day April 28.

=== Chatham Railroad Museum ===
This museum is located in the old Chicago & Alton Railroad Depot at 100 N. State Street in Chatham, Illinois. The permanent collection includes a library of railroad-related books, photographs, memorabilia, and examples of railroad equipment. The museum is open from 2-4 PM on the second and fourth Sundays of each month. Admission is free.

=== Cherry Mine Disaster Site ===
Cherry Mine Disaster Centennial observance, Nov. 2009 Cherry, Illinois

A historical marker is located in the Cherry Village Park on Illinois Route 89. Just north of Cherry are the remnants of the Cherry Coal Mine where 259 miners lost their lives in the 1909 Cherry Mine disaster, one of the worst mine disasters in United States history. The fire was apparently caused by the ignition of a load of hay intended for mule stables in the mine and it spread rapidly. The disaster led to the passage of stricter mine safety regulations and of the Illinois Workmen's Compensation Act. The cemetery at the south end of Cherry has a memorial erected in 1914 by the United Mine Workers of America; next to the Public Library & Town Hall is a new memorial, listing the names of the miners killed, erected to mark the centennial of the disaster in 2009. An exhibit of items relating to the disaster is in the Cherry Public Library.

=== The Coal Miner ===
This statue is located on the northeast grounds of the state capitol in Springfield. Sculpted by John Szaton, this figure honors miners killed on the job in over a century of mining in Illinois. At the urging of Vachel Davis, a Southern Illinois coal miner, poet and artist, the state Representative Paul Powell introduced a bill to appropriate $15,000 for the creation of a monument honoring the Illinois coal miner. Davis worked with Tinley Park sculptor John Szaton to transform Davis' famous painting into a 7-foot bronze statue. Dedicated on October 16, 1964. The plaque identifying the sculptor and dedication date was added on December 7, 1981.

=== Coal Miners' Memorial ===
The memorial located at 100 E. Main Street, in West Frankfort, Illinois, adjacent to the Depot Veterans Museum. The granite pyramid is a symbol of Little Egypt and honors all coal miners. On December 21, 1951, around 8:30 PM, a methane gas explosion caused a fire in the New Orient Mine No. 2 at West Frankfort, killing 119 miners. The blast was so strong it knocked cars weighing several tons off tracks and brought down overhead timbers. The explosion blew out the ventilating equipment in the mine, which had to be repaired before rescue operations could begin.

=== Coal Miners' Memorial Monument ===
This monument is located in Union Cemetery in Panama, Illinois, which is about 60 miles south of Springfield. The 10-foot tall monument is made of black marble and bears an etching of an early coalminer and a quotation from John L. Lewis, former president of the United Mine Workers, who lived in Panama and served as president of the local union in 1910. It is especially dedicated to the 6 miners who lost their lives in a 1915 gas explosion in the Panama mine and who are buried in unmarked graves in the cemetery. A total of 144 engraved memorial bricks, which were sold to raise funds for the monument, are laid at the site. This monument was dedicated on May 25, 2003.

=== Diamond Mine Disaster Site ===
1883 Diamond Mine Disaster marker, Illinois Route 113, Diamond, Illinois

This historical marker is located in Diamond Park in Diamond, Illinois, near Braidwood on the Grundy-Will County line. On February 16, 1883, part of the mine collapsed from the weight of melting snow, ice and heavy rains, trapping miners below. Numerous men and boys were killed, some as young as 13 years old. Steam pumps pumped water out of the mine for 38 days and recover efforts did not begin until March 25. Shortly after, the mine was sealed with the remaining 46 miners entombed.

=== First Coal Mine ===
An historical marker (since vanished) located on the north side of Illinois Route 127 at the east end of the bridge over the Big Muddy River east of Murphysboro, Illinois, commemorates the first commercial coal mining operations in Illinois. These were located in the Big Muddy River bluffs about 100 yards west of the highway bridge. These outcroppings not only supplied local needs, but perhaps as early as 1810, coal from them was sent by flatboat to market in New Orleans.

=== Zeigler Coal Miners' Memorial ===
Coal Miner Statue, town square, Zeigler, Illinois

In the main square in Zeigler, Illinois is the Miners Memorial of Zeigler, with a statue erected in 1974.

=== Granite City Steel Mill ===
This mill is probably the longest operating flat roll carbon steel integrated steel mill in the Western Hemisphere. The parent company, Granite Iron Rolling Mills started operations in 1878. It may also be the longest continuously unionized steel mill. When five local unions (United Steelworkers 16, 30, 67, 4063 & 9325) merged in 2003, the new became Local 1899. The number was chosen because historical documents verified that a labor agreement between owners and workers existed continuously since 1899.

The United Steelworkers currently represent most of the 2000+ workforce as Locals 50, 68 and 1899. Other than a brief shutdown from December 2008 to June 2009, during the national financial crisis, the plant has operated continuously since 1878.

In the late 1960s, financial pressures forced the closely held corporation to be sold to National Steel Corporation which operated the facility until sold in bankruptcy to United States Steel. US Steel currently owns and operated the 130+ year old facility which has been modernized and updated many times in the last forty years.

=== Illinois Department of Corrections Memorial ===
A memorial wall at the Pontiac Correctional Center in Pontiac, Illinois, honors the memory of Illinois Department of Corrections workers who died on the job. Dedicated May 9, 2002.

=== Illinois Firefighters' Memorial ===
Located at the lawn of the State Capitol building in Springfield, Illinois, near Monroe Street, the memorial was dedicated on May 13, 1999, "to the firefighters of Illinois who have given their lives in the line of duty and to those who heroically serve with courage, pride and honor." The memorial of four life-size, bronze firefighters and a rescued child on a 14-foot-tall stone cairn is surrounded by 2,400 red paver bricks and enclosed by a 2-foot wall. It was built through public contributions and the sale of Firefighter Memorial license plates. A ceremony is held at the memorial each May honoring Illinois' fallen Firefighters.

=== Illinois Workers' Memorial ===
Located on the lawn of the State Capitol building in Springfield, Illinois near Monroe street. Paid for by donations from union members, this 3,000 pound memorial "is dedicated to the memory of the thousands of Illinois workers killed and injured on the job." The bronze sculpture of three workers on top of a polished granite base was dedicated on April 28, 1992, with about 800 people in attendance. Illinois AFL–CIO President Richard Walsh and Chicago Federation of Labor President Robert Healey moderated the ceremony, with National AFL–CIO President Lane Kirkland giving the keynote speech.

=== Irish Railroad Workers' Monument ===
The memorial, which consists of a 6-foot marble Celtic cross with an inscription in English and Gaelic on a bronze plaque, is at the site of a mass grave of 50 Irish immigrant railroad workers anonymously buried in Funk's Grove cemetery, 8 miles south of Bloomington, Illinois. The laborers laid a rail line from Springfield, Illinois to Bloomington in 1852. It is presumed they were the victims of a cholera epidemic. Dedicated on Workers' Memorial Day, April 28, 2000.

=== Ironworkers' Memorial ===
The polished granite memorial is located along Lorentz Avenue, just off of Route 29 in Peoria, Illinois, and honors three members of Ironworkers Local 112 killed when a portion of the scaffolding they were standing on while repairing the McClugage Bridge in Peoria gave way, plunging them 60 feet into the Illinois River. The 4 by 5 foot granite slab has a picture of the McClugage Bridge and the names of the workers etched in it. It includes a granite bench and landscaping and was dedicated on April 24, 2001.

=== Jacksonville Labor Temple ===
The Labor Temple in Jacksonville, Illinois, is perhaps the oldest standing structure associated with organized labor in the United States and is listed on the National Register of Historic Places in Washington, D.C. It was built by pioneering members of the Jacksonville Trades and Labor Assembly in 1904 in downtown Jacksonville and was used for many decades as a headquarters for Labor. In recent years, the building had fallen into disrepair and was deemed unsafe and was in danger of being demolished by the City. The Springfield and Central Illinois Central Labor Council, assisted by the Illinois AFL–CIO and concerned union members, formed the Central Illinois Labor Temple Trust committee and established a trust to purchase the building and restore it to its original beauty. In June 2004 a check for $10,000 was presented to the City of Jacksonville from the state to help with restoration.

=== John L. Lewis Grave ===
The grave is located in Oak Ridge Cemetery on Monument Avenue in Springfield, Illinois. John L. Lewis (1880–1969), was president of the United Mine Workers of America from 1920 to 1960. He founded the Congress of Industrial Organizations in 1935 and served as its president until 1940. Lewis was born in Iowa and worked as a coal miner in Illinois and Iowa.

=== Madison County Workers' Memorial ===
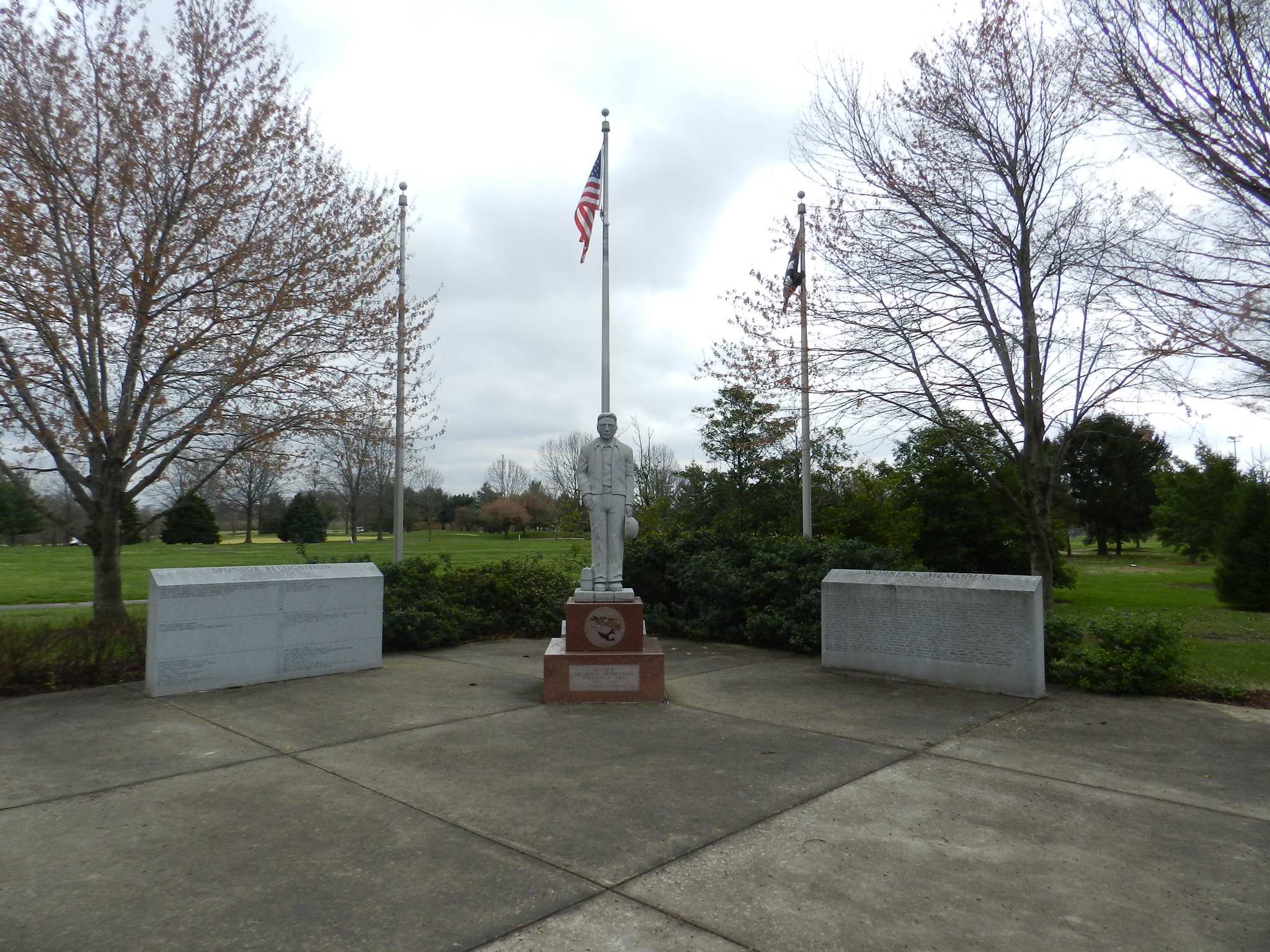

Located at the entrance to Gordon F. Moore Park in Alton, Illinois. This memorial is a life-size sculpture of a worker carrying his hard hat and lunch pail on a red granite base and with winged memorials of granite containing the names of men and women of Madison who died on the job.

=== John Mitchell Marker ===
Historical markers are located in three places in Spring Valley, Illinois. These locations include: the intersection of May Street and East Dakota Street (US Route 6), the intersection of Strong Avenue and West Dakota Street, and the intersection of Caroline Street and County Spaulding Street (Illinois Route 89). John Mitchell was born in Braidwood, Illinois, on February 4, 1870 and began work as a breaker boy in the Braidwood coal mines at the age of 12. From 1890 to 1910 he lived at 210 E. Dakota Street in Spring Valley. He joined the United Mine Workers of America in 1890 and its founding, rising through the ranks, and he served as president of the union from 1899 to 1908. He achieved national prominence in the settlement of the Pennsylvania anthracite miners strike in 1902. During World War I, he served on several city, state and regional agencies, including as chairman of the New York State Industrial Commission. Mitchell died September 9, 1919, in New York City and was buried at Scranton, Pennsylvania.

=== Mother Jones Monument ===
The monument was erected in 1936 and marks the grave of Mary Harris Jones ("Mother Jones", 1830–1930) in the Union Miners' Cemetery in Mount Olive, Illinois. The monument consists of a granite obelisk with a medallion bearing Mother Jones' likeness flanked by two bronze statues of coal miners. The monument is listed on the National Register of Historic Places.

=== Moweaqua Coal Mine Museum ===
The museum is located on Route 51 in Moweaqua, Illinois. It was opened in 1985 to commemorate the 1932 Moweaqua Coal Mine disaster, in which a gas explosion killed 54 miners. Methane gas escaped into the mine and was ignited by open flame carbide lights. Such lights were subsequently no longer used. Exhibits include coal mining tools and equipment, contemporary accounts of the disaster, and related artifacts. Each Christmas and Memorial Day, a ceremony is held during which 54 flags, each containing an image of a coal miner and his lamp, are displayed.

=== Normal Fire Fighters strike ===
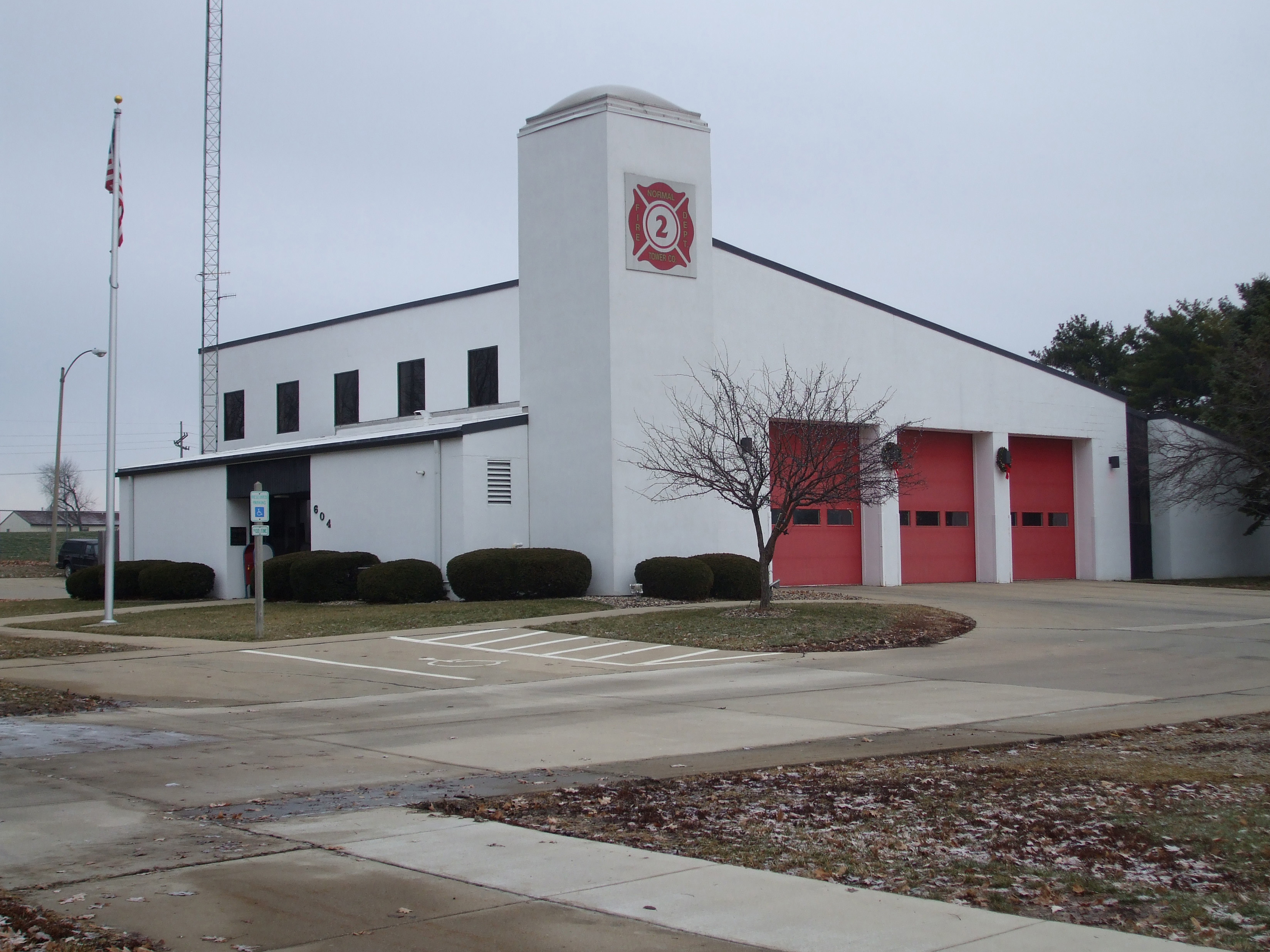
This fire station at 604 N. Adelaide Street, Normal, Illinois, was the focal point for the 1978 fire fighters strike.

In the spring of 1978, fire fighters in Normal struck for 56 days to win a first contract. Illinois had no public employee collective bargaining law until the 1980s. Seeking union recognition, Normal Fire Fighters Local 2442 struck in March 1978. The fire fighters maintained fire service from the picket line, refusing to enter the fire station. The Town quickly won a court injunction; the fire fighters were sentenced, en masse, to jail, becoming "Local 24/42"—24 fire fighters who were sentenced to 42 days in jail. They were broken into two shifts, one shift in the county jail, the second sentenced to work release at the fire station at 604 N. Adelaide Street in Normal. This brought national attention to the strike and frequent demonstrations were mounted outside the fire station and at town council meetings. After serving their 42 days in jail, negotiations resumed between the Town and Local 2442, resulting in a May 1978 contract between the union and the Town of Normal.

=== Ottawa Radium Girls Monument ===
This 2011 statue at Clinton and West Jefferson Streets memorializes the "radium girls," young women who died of radiation poisoning while painting clock dials in the 1920s and 1930s. The resulting publicity over their court case led to stricter industrial exposure laws.

=== Peoria Workers' Memorial ===
The memorial is located in front of the Peoria city hall in Peoria, Illinois, and was erected by the West Central Illinois Labor Council to honor union members who have died on the job.

=== Peoria Rocky Glen Park ===
In late 2012 the City of Peoria purchased the Rocky Glen area, a wooded, rugged area off Farmington Road. On the limestone outcroppings are carvings that point to this area as a secret organizing and meeting point for early mine workers' union efforts.

=== Railroad Workers' Monument ===
The monument, dedicated in 1982, is located in Miller Park in Bloomington, Illinois, and commemorates the railroad car building and repair shop workers in the former Chicago & Alton Railroad Company shops in the city, which opened in 1854 and ceased operations in the late 1970s. It is composed of a 6-foot tall whistle, which was blown for beginning and ending work and for lunch breaks at the old shops, mounted on limestone blocks salvaged from the steel car shop walls. A plaque dedicates the monument to the thousands who worked in the shops. The monument was built as a Comprehensive Employment and Training Act (CETA) project, giving unemployed youth experience at the construction trades, under the leadership of retired union construction workers. Adjoining the monument is Nickel Plate Road steam locomotive 639, which was moved to the park in 1959, also with help from donated union labor. This 1923 product from Lima, Ohio's Lima Locomotive Works is a typical 20th century freight steam locomotive, a 2-8-2 wheel arrangement, known as a "Mikado" type. Behind the locomotive is a Southern Pacific Railroad baywindow caboose, which was moved to the park by donated union labor in 1996.

=== Seneca Shipyard Monument ===
Located in Crotty Park in Seneca, Illinois, is a monument to the Landing Ship, Tank (LST), a World War II naval landing vessel. LSTs were built in inland shipyards like Seneca, and then floated down the Illinois and Mississippi Rivers to New Orleans, for use throughout the war. Between 1942 and 1945, 157 LSTs were launched from Seneca, Illinois, which had a workforce of 11,000. The monument includes a reproduction of an LST and panels that reflect the various tasks involved in ship building.

=== Refinery History Museum ===
The museum is located at Illinois Route 111 and Madison Avenue in Roxana, Illinois, in a former diagnostic center used for testing cars and engines to produce more efficient fuel. It was founded by retirees from the Shell Wood River Refining Company in 1993 and contains artifacts and memorabilia from the company. The museum is open from 10 AM to 4 PM on Wednesdays and Thursdays.

=== Reuben Soderstrom statue ===
At the northwest corner of Kent & Park Streets in City Park in downtown Streator, Illinois is a statue to Reuben Soderstrom (1888–1970), erected and dedicated on Labor Day 2012. Soderstrom, born in Minnesota to immigrant Swedish parents, was an Illinois state representative, elected as a Republican, from 1918 to 1936. He became president of the Illinois AFL in 1930 and then the combined Illinois AFL–CIO from 1958 until 1970.

=== Southern Illinois Coal Miners' Memorial ===
The monument consists of a stone slab with the figure of a coal miner etched in it. It is located in the city park in Marissa, Illinois, and honors the coal miners of Southern Illinois. It was dedicated August 1, 1921.

=== Union Miners' Cemetery ===
Located in Mount Olive, Illinois. The cemetery was founded in 1899 originally to house the graves of Mt. Olive miners killed in the Battle of Virden, October 12, 1898. It contains the graves of Mary Harris "Mother" Jones and coal miners. The cemetery is on the National Register of Historic Places.

== Chicago labor history sites ==
=== Chicago Labor Mural – Teamster Power ===
This huge mural celebrates the 1997 United Parcel Service strike victory and includes images of Albert Parsons, Haymarket martyr and his labor activist wife Lucy Parsons. Created in 1998 by Mike Alewitz, located at 300 S. Ashland Teamster City. The building has since been replaced and the mural is gone. Few at Teamster City remember it.

=== Chicago Labor Mural – The Worker ===
Presents the 20th century history of labor-management struggle in the meatpacking industry of Chicago. Located at 4859 S. Wabash (south exterior), the former headquarters building of District 1, United Packinghouse Workers of America, CIO. The building is now the Charles Hayes Family Investment Center operated by the Chicago Housing Authority. The mural was created in 1974 by William Walker,"father of the Chicago mural movement" and commissioned by the Illinois Labor History Society with funding from the Illinois Arts Council. The mural was restored in 1998 by Bernard Williams.

=== Chicago Labor Mural – Fabric of our Lives ===
Ceramic and glass tile mosaic, 12 × 14 foot depicting the life, labor and culture of Jewish immigrants in Chicago. Located at 3003 W. Touhy Avenue and created in 1980 by Miriam Socoloff & Cynthia Weiss.

=== Cigar Makers' Union Monument ===
Honors the surrounding graves of Chicago cigar makers. Located in Forest Home Cemetery (Waldheim); DesPlaines Avenue in Forest Park, Illinois.

=== Gompers Park, Chicago ===
Located at the corner of Foster and Pulaski Avenues in the North Park community, Gompers Park covers nearly 39 acres. The park straddles the Chicago River and features rehabilitated wetlands and a lagoon with pier access that lends itself to many environmental activities. A bronze statue by Susan Clinard memorializes Samuel Gompers (1850–1924), an important figure in the American labor movement. Born in London to a poor family of Jewish immigrants from the Netherlands, Gompers began working with his father as a cigar maker at the age of ten. He continued this work after he and his family settled on New York's Lower East Side in 1863. The following year, Gompers joined the United Cigar Makers and became increasingly concerned about conditions for workers and for relations between labor organizations. He was elected as the president of the Cigar Makers' International Union in 1875 and went on to help found the Federation of Trade and Labor Unions, which was later reorganized as the American Federation of Labor. Gompers served as the organization's first and longest–serving president.

=== Graceland Cemetery ===
The cemetery is located at 4001 N. Clark Street in Chicago, with the main entrance near Clark Street and Irving Park Road. Among those buried here are company founders George Pullman, Philip D. Armour, and Cyrus Hall McCormick; Governor John Peter Altgeld, who pardoned the remaining men convicted of the Haymarket bombing; and Allan Pinkerton, founder of the detective agency. The cemetery is open from 8 am to 4:30 pm.

=== Margaret A. Haley Plaque ===
A plaque honoring Margaret Haley is located in the headquarters of the Chicago Teachers' Union in the Merchandise Mart in Chicago. Margaret Haley was a pioneer of teacher unionism in the city. She was the first business representative of the Chicago Teachers Federation and a founder of and the first national organizer of the American Federation of Teachers.

=== Haymarket affair memorials ===
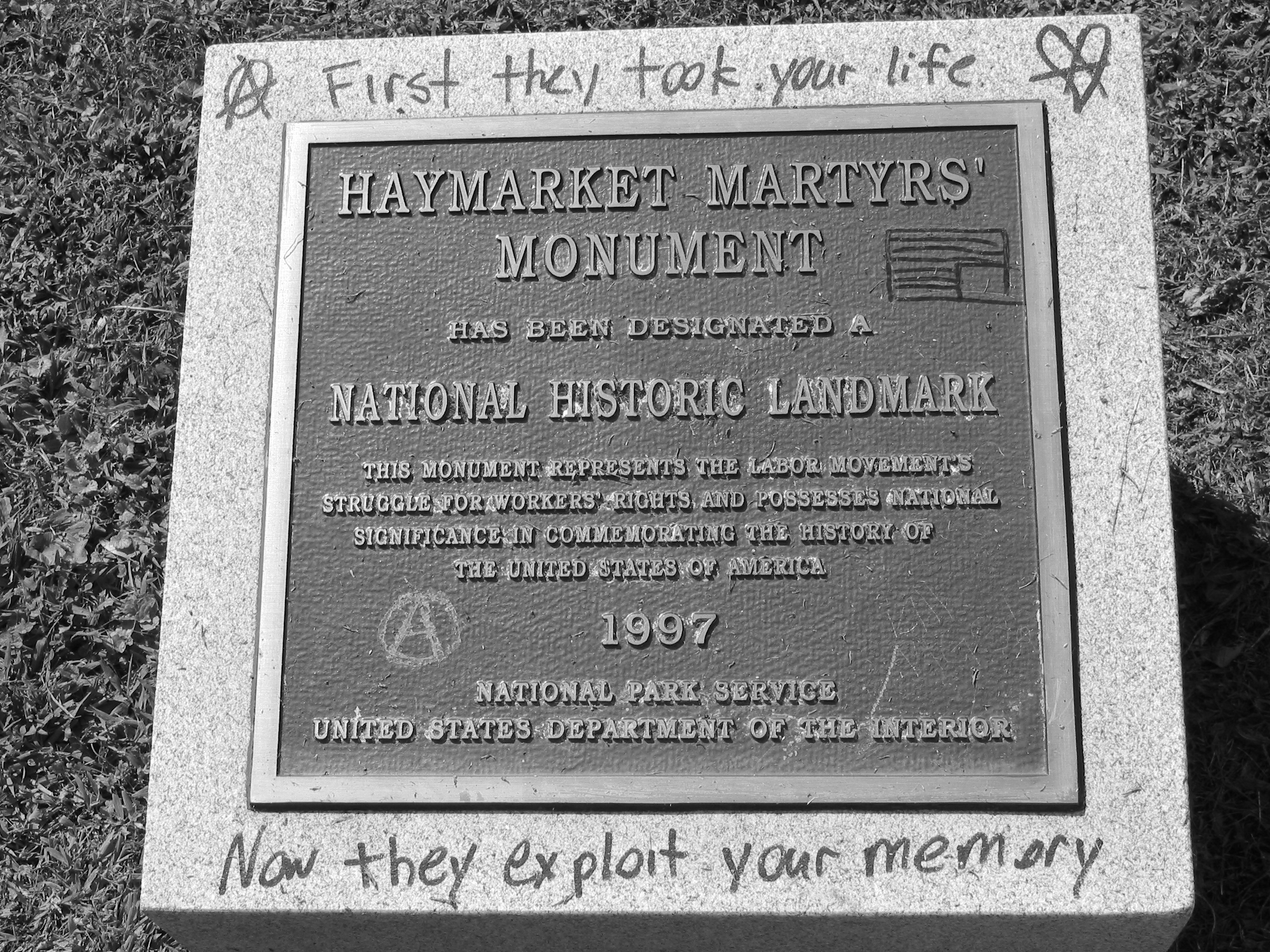
Haymarket Martyrs' Monument

On May 4, 1886, hundreds of workers gathered at Haymarket Square to demand an eight-hour day and to protest police action of the previous day against strikers at the McCormick Reaper plant. A bomb was thrown into the crowd by an unknown person, killing one police officer and wounding about 100 other people. Police started shooting, killing and injuring other police and workers. Eight anarchist leaders who were involved in organizing the meeting were found guilty of murder, and four were hanged.

Haymarket Martyrs' Monument, by sculptor Albert Weinert, is located in Forest Home (Waldheim) Cemetery, in the 900 block of S. Des Plaines Avenue, just south of the Eisenhower Expressway in Forest Park, Illinois. It marks the graves of seven of the eight Haymarket martyrs and is dedicated to the four men hanged for the Haymarket bombing on May 4, 1886. This monument takes its inspiration from "La Marseillaise", the national anthem of France. It depicts a laurel wreath being placed on the brow of the fallen hero, as the figure of Justice, the Goddess of Liberty represented by Marianne, advances resolutely toward the future. The Pioneer Aid and Support Society erected the monument and dedicated it on June 25, 1893. It was designated a National Historic Landmark in 1997.

Haymarket Square Memorial, dedicated to the struggles leading to the Haymarket riot, was dedicated on Labor Day 2004 on the corners of Randolph and Des Plaines streets in Chicago.

=== Hull House Museum ===
Two restored original buildings from Chicago's first settlement house, founded by Jane Addams in 1889, are located at 800 S. Halsted Street in Chicago. Addams devoted her life to social improvement, the abolishment of sweatshops and securing the passage of legislation to improve working conditions. Hull House is a National Historic Landmark and is operated by the University of Illinois at Chicago. Hours are weekdays 10 am-4 pm, Sunday noon-5. Admission is free.

=== Joliet Labor Murals – Preparing the World ===
Mural in 1996 by Kathleen Scarboro and Kathleen Farrell is located on the northwest corner of Michigan and Cass Streets in Joliet, Illinois. Features workers on the job in Joliet's important wallpaper industry.

=== Joliet Labor Murals – City of Steel ===
Mural in 1997 by Javier Chavira is located on the northeast side of Michigan Street at East Washington Street in Joliet, Illinois. Honors the workers, both women and men, of Joliet's former steel industry.

=== Memorial Day Massacre ===
A memorial to the persons who died in the Memorial Day massacre of 1937 is located at the union hall of United Steelworkers of America Local 1033 at 11731 Avenue O, Chicago. When Republic Steel refused to recognize the Steelworkers Organizing Committee, supporters from around Chicago gathered at the union's headquarters on Memorial Day 1937 and marched toward the Republic Steel mill. Police tried to stop the march and fired into the crowd killing 10 people and pursuing fleeing demonstrators.

=== Lucy Parsons Park ===
Located at 4712 W. Belmont Avenue in the Portage Park neighborhood of Chicago, the pocket park is named for Lucy Ella Gonzales Parsons (1853–1942), organizer, feminist, and anarchist, the wife of Albert Parsons, who was hanged in 1887 for participation in the Haymarket Riot. Lucy Parsons was a noted public speaker and writer. She attended the founding convention in Chicago of the Industrial Workers of the World in 1905 and led a march of Chicago unemployed in 1915.

=== Pullman Historic District ===
centering on 111th Street and Cottage Grove Avenue in Chicago, the district extends east to I-94. The first planned industrial town in the nation, Pullman was founded in 1880 by George Pullman, inventor of the railroad sleeping car, for his workers. In 1894 violence connected with a strike over wage cuts caused President Cleveland to send federal troops to restore order. In 1907 the town was annexed to Chicago. A visitor center is located at the Florence Hotel, 11111 S. Forrestville.

=== A. Philip Randolph Pullman Porter Museum ===
This privately run museum was founded in 1995 as a tribute to Pullman porters, whose union, the Brotherhood of Sleeping Car Porters, was the first black labor union to negotiate a collective bargaining agreement with a major corporation. The museum is located at 10406 S. Maryland Avenue in Chicago.

=== Workers' Memorial Mural ===
A mural dedicated to workers who died on the job is located in the lobby of International Brotherhood of Electrical Workers (IBEW) Local 134, 600 W. Washington Blvd. in Chicago. The memorial was dedicated in 1998.

== See also ==
- Illinois Labor History Society
