= List of historical societies in Illinois =

The following is a list of historical societies in the state of Illinois, United States.

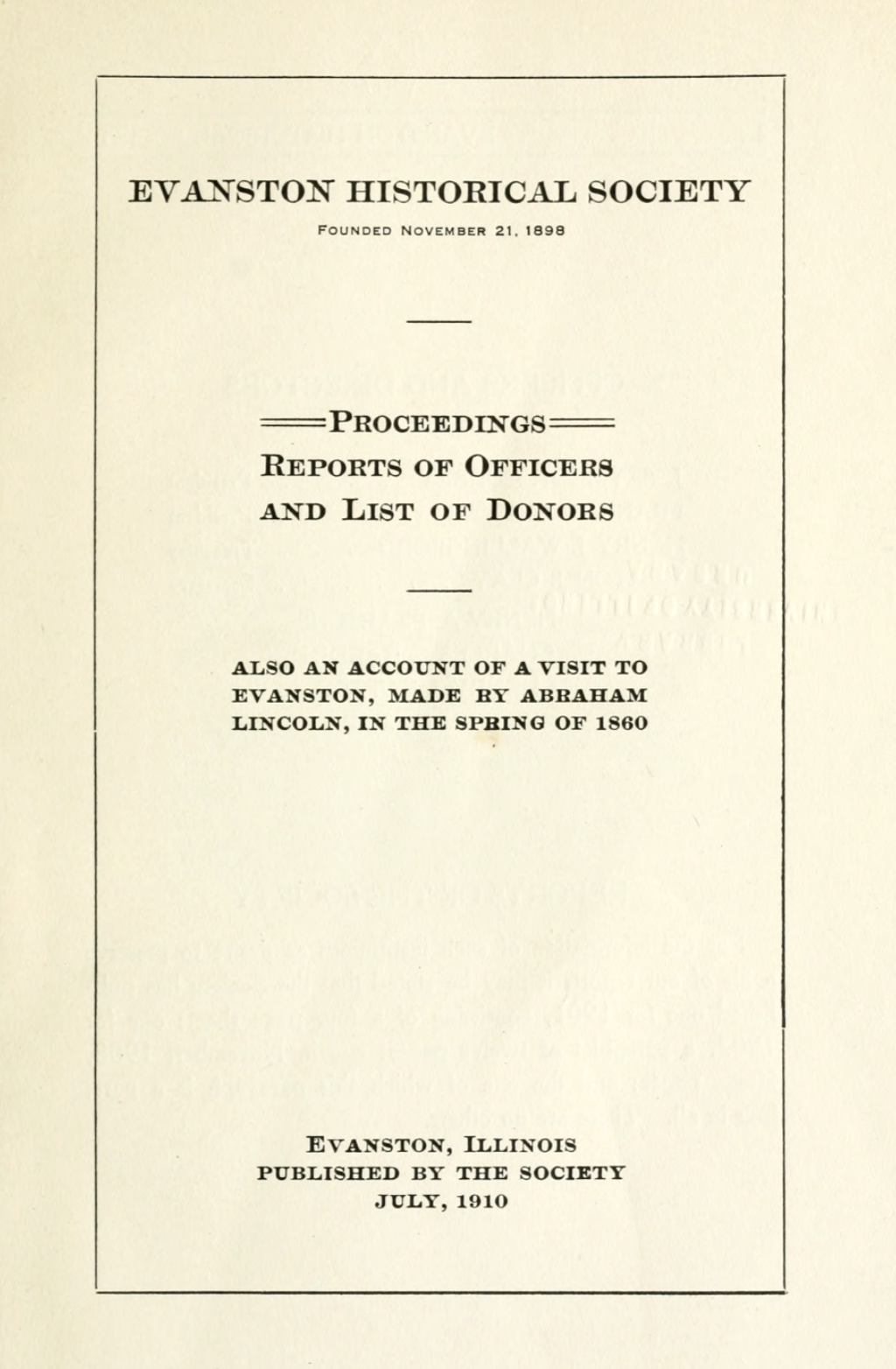
1910 Proceedings of the Evanston Historical Society, Illinois

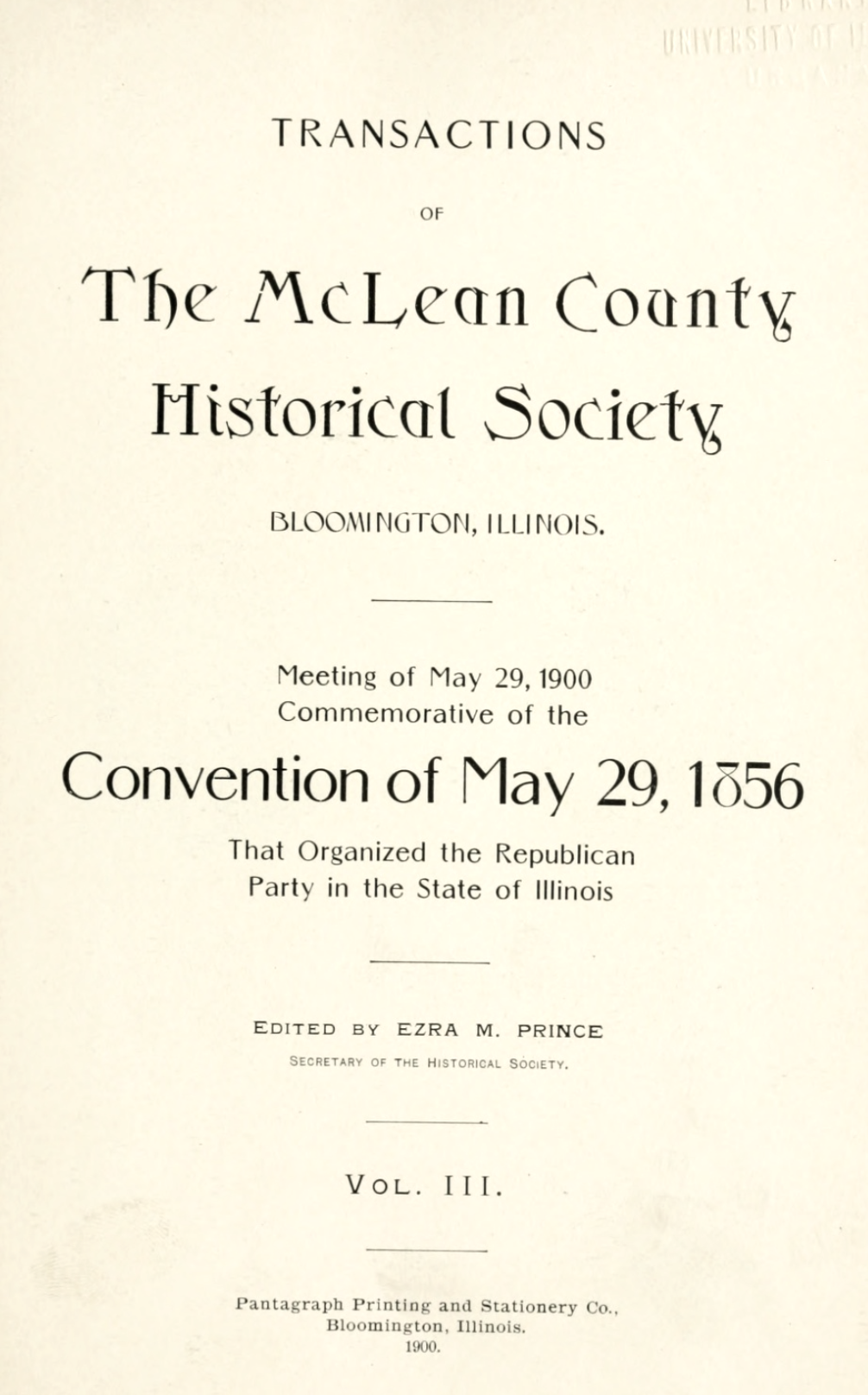
1900 Transactions of the McLean County Historical Society, Illinois

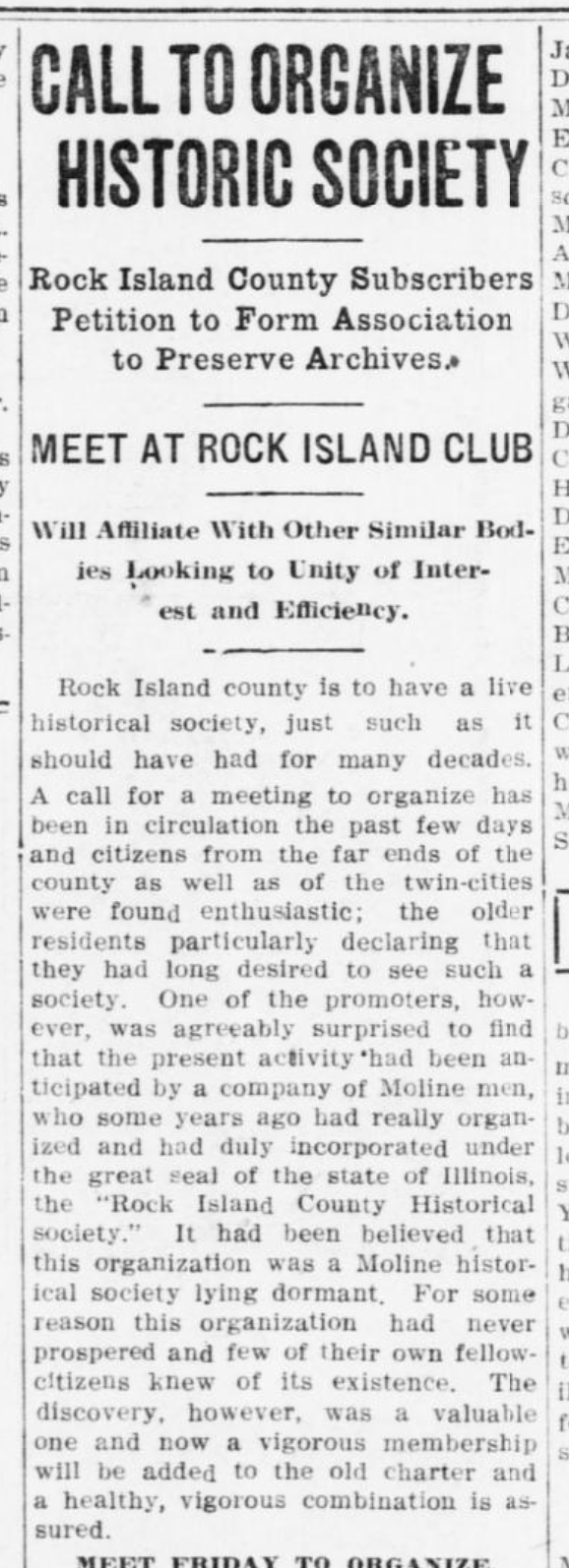
1912 newspaper item about the re-establishment of the Rock Island County Historical Society, Illinois

== Organizations ==
- Antiquarian and Historical Society of Illinois
- Augustana Historical Society
- Aurora Historical Society
- Bond County Historical Society
- Boone County Historical Society
- Bureau County Historical Society
- Cairo Historical Society
- Calhoun County Historical Society
- Carroll County Historical Society
- Cass County Historical Society
- Champaign County Historical Society
- Chicago Historical Society
- Chicago Lawn Historical Society
- Christian County Historical Society
- Clark County Historical Society
- Clinton County Historical Society
- Cole County Historical Society
- Cook County Historical Society
- Crawford County Historical Society
- Cumberland County Historical Society
- DeKalb Historical Society
- DeWitt County Genealogical Society
- DuPage County Historical Society
- East Peoria Historical Society
- Edwards County Historical Society
- Edgar County Historical Society
- Effingham County Historical Society
- Englewood Historical Association
- Evanston Historical Society
- Franklin Grove Historical Society
- Franklin Society (in Chicago)
- Gallatin County Historical Society
- German American Historical Society of Illinois
- Golden Historical Society
- Glencoe Historical Society
- Grundy County Historical Society
- Hamilton County Historical Society
- Harvey Historical Society
- Hyde Park Historical Society (in Chicago)
- Illinois State Historical Society
- Jefferson County Historical Society
- Jersey County Historical Society
- Historical Society of Joliet
- La Grange Historical Society
- Lee County Historical Society
- Libertyville-Mundelein Historical Society
- Kankakee County Historical Society
- Kendall County Historical Society
- Macon County Historical Society
- Macoupin County Historical Society
- Madison County Historical Society
- McLean County Historical Society
- Morgan County Historical Society
- Morgan Park Historical Society
- Oak Park Historical Society
- Peoria Historical Society
- Perry County Historical Society
- Pioneer Association of Will County
- Historical Society Of Quincy & Adams County
- Ravenswood-Lake View Historical Association
- Ridge Historical Society (in Chicago)
- Rock Island County Historical Society
- St. Charles Historical Society
- St. Clair County Historical Society
- Historical Association of Greater St. Louis
- Saline County Historical Society
- Schuyler County Historical Society
- South Shore Historical Society (in Chicago)
- Thebes Historical Society
- Vermilion County Historical Association
- West Side Historical Society (in Chicago)
- Wheeling Historical Society
- Winnebago County Historical Society
- Historical Society of Woodlawn

== See also ==
- History of Illinois
- List of museums in Illinois
- National Register of Historic Places listings in Illinois
- List of historical societies in the United States
