= 2025 in Illinois =

- Decades: 2000s; 2010s; 2020s
- See also: History of Illinois; Historical outline of Illinois; List of years in Illinois; 2025 in the United States

The following is a list of events of the year 2025 in Illinois.

== Incumbents ==
=== State government ===
- Governor: J. B. Pritzker (D)

== Events ==
=== January ===
- January 5 – Illinois is affected by the January 5–6, 2025 United States blizzard.

=== February ===
- February 28 – Joseph Czuba, who stabbed 6-year-old Wadea al-Fayoume to death in Plainfield Township in 2023, is found guilty on all charges. He is sentenced to 53 years in prison on May 2 and dies in prison on July 24.

=== April ===
- April 23 – 2025 Southwest United States measles outbreak: The Illinois Department of Public Health confirms the state's first measles case in 2025.
- April 28 – A car drives into a building used as an after-school camp in Chatham, killing three children and a teenager. Police state the driver may have suffered a medical emergency that led to the crash.

=== June ===
- June 25 – A fire at an apartment building in Austin, Chicago kills four residents and injures three. A man is arrested and charged with arson. Investigators say the suspect was intending to kill his ex-girlfriend and a friend she was dating, though neither were in the building at the time.

=== July ===
- July 2 – Four people are killed and 14 injured in a Chicago drive-by shooting.
- July 31 – Governor Pritzker signs a bill requiring all public school students from grades 3 through 12 to undergo annual mental health screenings. The law makes Illinois the first state with mandated mental health screenings for students.
- July 31–August 3 – Lollapalooza music festival

=== August ===
- August 30 – Chicago Mayor Brandon Johnson signs an executive order forbidding local police from aiding in federal immigration enforcement in response to President Trump saying he would send troops to the city.

=== September ===
- September 4 – Northwestern University President Michael Schill announces he is resigning.
- September 8 – The Department of Homeland Security begins an operation dubbed "Operation Midway Blitz", which the department says will target "criminal illegal aliens".
- September 12 – ICE agents kill undocumented immigrant Silverio Villegas-Gonzalez in Forest Park after he allegedly drags an officer with his car during an attempted arrest.

=== October ===
- October 4
  - Governor Pritzker announces that the Department of Homeland Security is planning on federalizing the Illinois National Guard and sending guardsmen to Chicago, against the wishes of him and Mayor Brandon Johnson.
  - Border Patrol agents shoot and injure American citizen Marimar Martinez while on patrol. The DHS claims Martinez was part of a group who boxed in agents with ten vehicles. DHS initially says officers shot the woman because she had a firearm, but later say they shot her because she attempted to drive a car into an agent.
- October 14 – A Cook County judge signs an order that bars ICE from arresting people at courthouses.
- October 16
  - A federal judge orders federal immigration officers in the Chicago area must wear body cameras.
  - ICE arrests a Hanover Park Police officer from Montenegro and accuses him of being in the United States illegally.
- October 23 – Border Patrol Commander-at-large Gregory Bovino throws a tear gas canister at protesters in Chicago. Five days later, a federal judge orders Bovino to report to her daily with a report on arrests and incidents involving Border Patrol.
- October 29 – Former Sangamon County Sheriff's deputy Sean Grayson is found guilty of second-degree murder for the shooting of Sonya Massey, who Grayson shot in her home in 2024.

=== November ===
- November 4 – Trinity Christian College in Palos Heights announces it will close after the 2025–26 school year.
- November 17 - A man sets a woman on fire on a Chicago Transit Authority train in Chicago. He is charged with federal terrorism offences.
- November 20 – Prosecutors drop charges against Marimar Martinez, who was accused of attempting to strike Border Patrol agents with her car in October. The woman had been shot and injured by an agent, who later bragged about it via text message.

=== December ===
- December 23 – The Supreme Court rules that Trump cannot send the National Guard to Chicago.
- December 31 – Trump says he is dropping his push to deploy National Guard troops in Chicago, as well as Los Angeles and Portland.

== Deaths ==
- October 9 – Sister Jean, 106, chaplain for the Loyola Ramblers men's basketball team.

== See also ==
- 2025 in the United States
