= Rockmen Guardians =

The Rockmen Guardians (also known as the Four Rock Guardians) are a group of sculptures located in Rockford, Illinois, United States, south of the Sinnissippi greenhouse on the west side of the Rock River recreation path. There are four figures composed of granite rocks and cement, depicting larger-than-life male warriors in armor. The artist is Terese Agnew of Milwaukee, Wisconsin.

The work was built in autumn 1987 and spring 1988 and the statues are about 12 feet (3.7 m) tall. They are located at 42°16′50.11″N 89°4′35.85″W. They are popular with tourists using the Rock River recreation path.
