= Illinois State Historical Society =

Nonprofit based in Springfield, Illinois, US

The Illinois State Historical Society (ISHS) is a private sector organization, organized as a nonprofit, that edits and disseminates public knowledge of history throughout the U.S. state of Illinois. It was founded in 1899 and operates from Springfield.

The ISHS has a journal, which was established in 1908. The journal is issued quarterly by the University of Illinois Press. Subjects include early women's education, socialism, coal mining, and anti-Mormon sentiment in Illinois. Its volumes can be browsed on the Illinois Digital Archives, an office of the Secretary of State.

== History and functions ==
The ISHS was created as an entity with the original purpose of gathering and publishing materials on paper relating to Illinois' early history. American Civil War veterans and the grandchildren of the state's early settlers were eager to learn how Illinois had organized itself in the years prior to the 1860 presidential election of Abraham Lincoln. As time passed, the focus of the Society shifted from books to periodicals and symposia. Affiliated and independent scholars were given a venue to publish their findings. As paved highway mileage increased in Illinois in the early 1900s, the ISHS began to build and maintain state highway historic markers. The Society's work continued to focus on pioneer years and the 19th century.

Although historically affiliated with the state government of Illinois and the agencies that developed into the Illinois Historic Preservation Agency, the ISHS was emancipated in 1997 and fully launched into the private sector. As of 2014, the ISHS publishes the quarterly Journal of the Illinois State Historical Society, a scholarly publication, and the bimonthly Illinois Heritage, a newsletter with short historical features. The Society holds meetings and symposia, and offers small prizes and scholarships for continued work and studies in Illinois history, with growing emphasis on the social history of the 20th century in Illinois.

== See also ==
- List of historical societies in Illinois
- Illinois Historic Preservation Division
