= Dodds Park =

Park in Illinois, United States

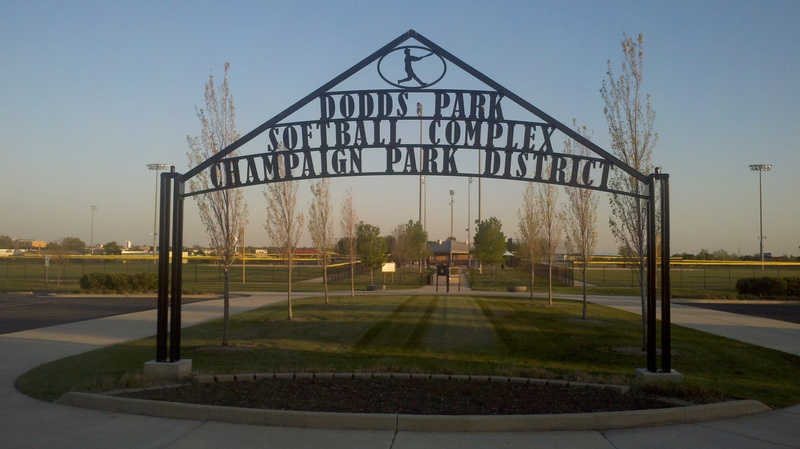
- Dodds Park Softball Complex
- Interactive map of Dodds Park
- Location: Champaign, Illinois
- Coordinates: 40°07′53″N 88°16′58″W
- Area: 110 acres (45 ha)
- Elevation: 748 feet (228 m)
- Created: 1969
- Operator: Champaign Park District
- Status: Open all year
- Public transit: MTD

Dodds Park is located in northwestern Champaign, Illinois near Parkland College. This 110-acre (45 ha) park (roughly one fifth of the total Park District holdings) is noted for the "Tribute to Olympic Athletes Monument" on its grounds. The park was purchased in 1969 for the sum of $298,495.

== Facilities ==
The park has seven lighted baseball fields and 12 soccer fields on its grounds. Additionally, it features a small playground and picnic tables.

== Champaign County Workers' Memorial ==
The memorial was dedicated on Labor Day September 2, 2002, and serves as a memorial to those workers who had lost their lives while working on the job. The memorial consists of two tablets which bear the names of those who have died working in Champaign County.

== Tribute to Olympic athletes ==
The "Tribute to Olympic Athletes" was created to honor those residents of Champaign County who have competed in the Olympics. To date, 41 athletes are commemorated on the monument since the tribute's dedication on July 4, 1991. The monument consists of several rising plateaus forming a walkway leading to a large granite gateway. Beyond the gateway a pedestal overlooking the playing fields in Dodds Park is inscribed with the names of those who have represented Champaign County in the Olympics.

=== Notable Olympic athletes ===
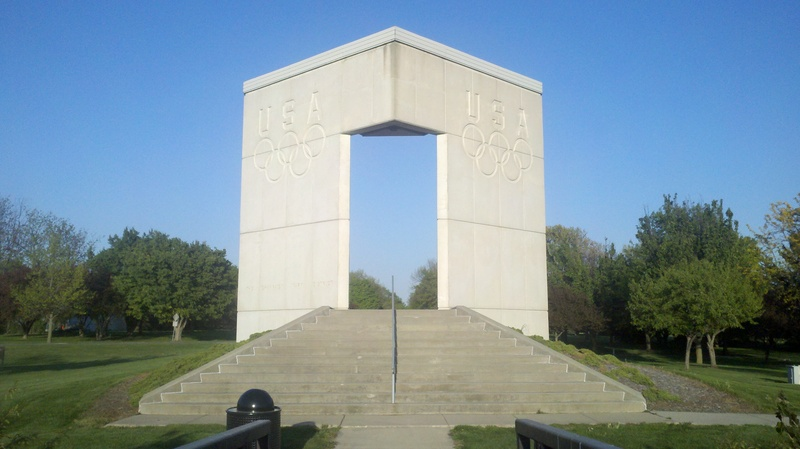
Tribute to Olympic Athletes, Dodds Park, Champaign, Illinois

- Jean Driscoll, Wheelchair racing, 5x, 3x, 4x, 2000 Sydney, 1996 Atlanta, 1992 Barcelona, 1988 Seoul
- Bonnie Blair, Speedskating, 5x,, 1984 Sarajevo, 1988 Calgary, 1992 Albertville, 1994 Lillehammer
- Bob Richards, Pole Vault, 2x,, 1948 London, 1952 Helsinki, 1956 Melbourne
- Nichole Millage, Paralympic volleyball, 2x, 2012 London, 2008 Beijing
- Tyler McGill, 4 × 100 m medley,, 2012 London
- Robert Espeseth, Rowing,, 1976 Montreal, 1980 Moscow, 1984 Los Angeles, 1988 Seoul
- Gia Lewis-Smallwood, Discus, 2012 London
- Karen Brems-Kurreck, Cycling, 2000 Sydney
- Dwight "Dike" Eddleman, High Jump, 1948 London
