= History of Illinois =

Historical population
Year	Pop.	±% p.a.
1800	2,458	—
1810	12,282	+17.45%
1820	55,211	+16.22%
1830	157,445	+11.05%
1840	476,183	+11.70%
1850	851,470	+5.98%
1860	1,711,951	+7.23%
1870	2,539,891	+4.02%
1880	3,077,871	+1.94%
1890	3,826,352	+2.20%
1900	4,821,550	+2.34%
1910	5,638,591	+1.58%
1920	6,485,280	+1.41%
1930	7,630,654	+1.64%
1940	7,897,241	+0.34%
1950	8,712,176	+0.99%
1960	10,081,158	+1.47%
1970	11,113,976	+0.98%
1980	11,426,518	+0.28%
1990	11,430,602	+0.00%
2000	12,419,293	+0.83%
2010	12,830,632	+0.33%
2020	12,812,508	−0.01%
Source: 1910–2020

The history of Illinois may be defined by several broad historical periods, namely, the pre-Columbian period, the era of European exploration and colonization, its development as part of the American frontier, its early statehood period, growth in the 19th and 20th centuries, and the contemporary Illinois of today.

== Pre-Columbian era ==
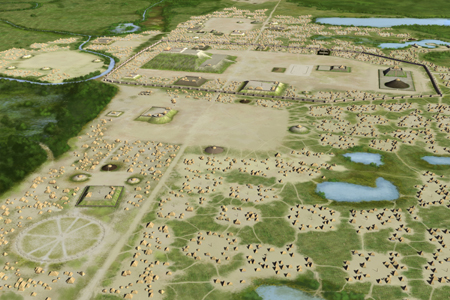
Cahokia, urban center of the pre-Columbian Mississippian culture

Cahokia, the urban center of the pre-Columbian Mississippian culture, was located near present-day Collinsville, Illinois. Several burial mounds and adobe structures were created in Southern Illinois across the Mississippi River from St. Louis. A gigantic mound, known as Monks Mound near Cahokia, is about the same height from its base as the Pyramid of Giza. Built around 1050 AD by an immense marshaling of human labor, this huge earth-work faced the site of a palisaded city that contained more than one hundred small artificial mounds marking burial sites. This Mississippi valley city of Cahokia is estimated to have had a population of about 16,000 to 20,000, the most concentrated population north of the Rio Grande until the late 1700s. Radiating out from Cahokia for many miles were tilled fields that supplied the corn for the urban dwellers. That civilization vanished circa 1400–1500 for unknown reasons. A severe earthquake that damaged Monk's Mound at that time might have challenged the supernatural powers claimed by the Cahokian chiefs. Cahokians might have also outstripped their water supply caused in part by large-scale deforestation, and the period of global cooling or mini Ice Age of the era might have caused recurring famines and migration.

The next major power in the region was the Illiniwek Confederation, a political alliance among several tribes. The Illiniwek gave Illinois its name. The Ho-Chunk, a Siouan people of the Chiwere subgroup & the alleged oldest continuous Siouan society, were also believed to claim some land north of the Rock River. During the Beaver Wars period of the 17th century, the Iroquois pushed through and briefly conquered Ohio, Indiana & Southern Michigan, forcing several peoples out of those regions. Several migrating groups of Miami & Mascouten—the oldest known inhabitants of Indiana & S. Michigan—spread throughout the western Great Lakes & Upper Mississippi region, living wherever they could. The known tribes were the Miami, Mascouten, Wea, Atchatchakangouen, Pepicokia, Mengakonkia, Pinakashaw & Kilatika. The Beaver Wars also caused a secondary conflict in the greater Wisconsin area known as the Second Fauk War, which pushed the ancestors of the Lakota/ Dakota out onto the plains & destabilized the Dakotas.

The French, who arrived during the 1670s–80s and established the Illinois colony, helped to stabilize the region. The Miami & Mascouten subtribes merged back into two—the Miami & Wea-- & returned to the east in the 1690s. In the aftermath of the Yamasee War (1715–1717) in the early 18th century, the French also offered aid to a breakaway group of Yuchi known as the Chisca, who had once resided in southeast Kentucky and had them migrate into Illiniwek territory. During the French & Indian War, English influence spread deep into and destabilized the Illinois Colony. The largely Algonquian-ized Chisca split away and returned to Kentucky, taking several of the Illiniwek peoples with them (although, some remained) and became known as the Kispoko. The Kispoko soon after merged with the Shawnee. Later, the remaining Illiniwek were pushed out onto the Great Plains, alike many other tribes and were broken down as several peoples fought for adequate land. Today, the remaining Illiniwek are part of a single tribe—the Peoria of Oklahoma.

== European exploration and colonization ==
French explorers Jacques Marquette and Louis Jolliet explored the Mississippi and Illinois Rivers in 1673. As a result of their exploration, the Illinois Country was part of the French empire until 1763, when it passed to the British, who later annexed the area to Canada in 1774. It was later ceded to the new United States in 1783 and became part of the Northwest Territory. The Illinois campaign was part of the Western theater of the American Revolutionary War.

== American Territory ==
The Illinois-Wabash Company was an early claimant to much of Illinois. An early western outpost of the United States, Fort Dearborn, was established in 1803 (at the site of present-day Chicago), and the creation of the Illinois Territory followed on February 3, 1809.

== Statehood ==
On December 3, 1818, Illinois became the 21st U.S. state. Early U.S. expansion began in the south part of the state and quickly spread northward, driving out the native residents. In 1832, some Native American "Indians" returned from Iowa but were driven out in the Black Hawk War, fought by militia.

Illinois is known as the "Land of Lincoln" because it is here that the 16th President spent his formative years. Chicago gained prominence as a lake and canal port after 1848, and as a rail hub soon afterward. By 1857, Chicago was the state's dominant metropolis. (see History of Chicago).

=== Slavery ===
The state has a varied history in relation to slavery and the treatment of African Americans in general. The French had black slaves from 1719 to as late as the 1820s. Slavery was nominally banned by the Northwest Ordinance, but that was not enforced. When Illinois became a sovereign state in 1818, the Ordinance no longer applied, and there were about 900 slaves in the state. As the southern part of the state, known as "Egypt", was largely settled by migrants from the South, the section was hostile to free blacks and allowed settlers to bring slaves with them for labor. Pro-slavery elements tried to call a convention to legalize slavery, but they were blocked by Governor Edward Coles who mobilized anti-slavery forces, warning that rich slave owners would buy up all the good farm lands. A referendum in 1823 showed 60% of the voters opposed slavery and efforts to make slavery official failed. Nevertheless, some slaves were brought in seasonally or as house servants as late as the 1840s. The Illinois Constitution of 1848 was written with a provision for exclusionary laws to be passed. In 1853, state senator John A. Logan helped pass a law to prohibit all African Americans, including freedmen, from settling in the state. After 1865 Logan reversed positions and became a leading advocate of civil rights for blacks.

=== Mormons at Nauvoo ===
In 1839, members of the Church of Jesus Christ of Latter Day Saints, usually called Mormons, created a city they named Nauvoo. By 1840 church leadership envisioned Nauvoo as an economic, cultural and spiritual center—a religious utopia guided by church leaders. The city, situated on a prominent bend along the Mississippi River, quickly grew to 12,000 inhabitants and was for a time rivaling for the title of largest city in Illinois. By the early 1840s, the Latter Day Saints built a large stone temple in Nauvoo, one of the largest buildings in Illinois at the time, which was completed in 1846. In 1844 Joseph Smith, the church's founder was killed in nearby Carthage, Illinois. In 1846, the Mormons following Brigham Young left Illinois for what would become Utah, but what was still then Mexican territory. A small breakaway group remained, but Nauvoo fell largely into abandonment. Nauvoo today has many restored buildings from the 1840s.

=== American Civil War ===
During the Civil War, over 250,000 soldiers from Illinois served in the Union Army, the fourth most by state. Starting with President Lincoln's first call for troops and continuing throughout the war, Illinois sent 150 infantry regiments; they were numbered from the 7th IL to the 156th IL. Seventeen cavalry regiments also served as well as two light artillery regiments. The most well worked soldier was Ulysses S. Grant of Galena. Throughout the war the Republicans were in control, under the firm leadership of Governor Richard Yates The Democrats had a strong Copperhead element that opposed the war and tried in local areas to disrupt the draft. In Chicago, Wilbur F. Storey made his Democratic newspaper the Chicago Times into Lincoln's most vituperative enemy.

== 20th century ==
=== Economy ===
Northern Illinois, particularly Chicago and its surrounding areas, was a major industrial powerhouse. The steel industry along the Calumet River was a significant employer and economic driver, especially in the early to mid-20th century. Chicago grew rapidly and remained a crucial Midwestern center for manufacturing, trade, and transportation.

Coal mining in central and southern Illinois was important in the late 19th and early 20th centuries. The 1909 Cherry Mine disaster was an underground fire that killed 259 miners in the third worst disaster in the history of American coal mining. After 1940 there was a steady decline in coal mining.

Chicago and Urbana played international roles in scientific and technological advancements. Under the leadership of Enrico Fermi, the University of Chicago in 1942 was the site of Chicago Pile-1. It was the world's first self-sustained Nuclear chain reaction, ushering in the Atomic Age.

=== Progressive era: 1900-1929 ===
The Progressive Era in Illinois and Chicago, roughly from 1900 to the 1920s, was characterized by multiple overlapping middle class movements to address the social, economic, and political problems arising from rapid industrialization, urbanization, and immigration. Political leaders included Edward F. Dunne a Democrat as mayor of Chicago (1905-1907) and governor of the state 1913–1917. He was succeeded by Republican Frank O. Lowden, who led the state's war effort in World War I.

Chicago was a national leader in the settlement house movement, most famously with Jane Addams. Her Hull House provided vital services to immigrant communities, including education, childcare, vocational training, and cultural programs. It served as centers for social research and advocacy, bringing attention to issues like child labor, poor housing, and public health.

Women took the lead as reformers pushed for improvements in urban living conditions, including better housing standards, garbage collection, and sewage systems. Muckrakers exposed unsanitary conditions in meatpacking (as famously depicted by Upton Sinclair in exaggerated form in 1905 in The Jungle. This best-selling novel was set in southside Chicago. It stimulated the national reform movement, especially the Pure Food and Drug Act passed by Congress in 1906. Activists in Illinois successfully campaigned for laws to end child labor by prohibiting employment of children under 14, and to limit working hours for women.

The temperance movement to restrict or prohibit alcohol was strong in Protestant strongholds in rural Illinois, driven by concerns about its social impact, particularly on families and the working class. Urban saloons were denounced as centers of political corruption and social ills. War with Germany (1917-1918) became a cudgel to shut down German beer gardens and taverns across the state.

Progressives supported reforms that increased citizen participation in government, especially the direct election of senators and, most significantly, women's suffrage. Illinois played a role in the national women's suffrage movement, culminating in the 19th Amendment in 1920. see Women's suffrage in Illinois.

Chicago was the base for the crusade by Ida B. Wells-Barnett to fight against the upsurge of lynching Blacks in the South. She also founded the Alpha Suffrage Club, the first such organization for Black women in Illinois. She helped elect Oscar Stanton De Priest as the first Black alderman in Chicago; he later served as the only Black man in Congress 1929 to 1935. When the outbreak of World War one cut off immigration of workers from Europe, many thousands of Blacks from the Deep South migrated to Chicago and other Northern industrial cities. Race relations were troubled, with major riots attacking Blacks in the East St. Louis massacre in 1917 and in the much larger Chicago race riot of 1919. On a smaller scale there was an anti-Black riot in Springfield in 1908

==== Good roads ====
In 1905 Illinois had 90,000 miles of dirt roads—locally built as cheaply as possible and badly maintained. Most farmers were frozen in place for weeks at a time in the muddy season. In the 1890s bicyclists organized and demanded good roads. After 1900 automobiles started appearing, and experts at the University of Illinois demonstrated that concrete roads were needed. The dilemma was the downstate Republican coalition. There were multiple well-organized factions, each wanted someone else to pay more of the cost. Study after study was made, and almost no roads were upgraded. Edward Dunne was elected governor in 1912 when the Republicans split between President William Taft and a new party under ex-President Theodore Roosevelt. Dunne was a Chicago Democrat, and was not beholden to any of the downstate factions. He realized that good roads would dramatically enhance the Chicago economy, as farmers shipped their crops and animals more cheaply to Chicago. In turn, they would buy their household goods mail order from Montgomery Ward and Sears Roebuck based in Chicago. Paved roads would benefit, to a greater or lesser extent, all of the downstate factions. Dunne’s solution was to impose a new plan that most of the downstate factions could support, pouring in millions of dollars of state money in a long-term program that would upgrade the roads in every county In Illinois. Furthermore, when Democrat Woodrow Wilson became president in 1913, Dunne helped convince Congress to add federal money to the spending on roads. Good roads became a national priority, and by the 1920s it was a major boost to the economy as the United States took the world lead in automobiles and in good roads.

==== 1920s ====
The 1920s was a time of rapid economic. growth and prosperity in the Chicago area, and a decline in prosperity for the agricultural regions in the state. Cultural shifts were dramatic in with the "Roaring Twenties" This included the rise of new forms of entertainment: silent movies, radio and jazz music. Social norms were loosening: young women in short skirts were called. "Flappers". Advertising and consumerism drove the economy, and mortgages made home buying popular. However, there was often a clash between these modern trends and more traditional, often rural, values.

Thanks to decades of crusading by evangelical Protestants across the country, and hostility to all things German. during the Great World War, nationwide prohibition. was enacted by the 18th Amendment to the US Constitution. The promise was a reduction in crime and disorder, but the result was a dramatic increase in "bootlegging" (illegal alcohol production), with sales in secret speakeasies. Chicago, in particular, became notorious for its powerful bootlegging gangs, with figures like Al Capone dominating the city's criminal underworld. This fueled widespread political corruption, especially under Chicago's corrupt Republican mayor Big Bill Thompson. Bootlegging was also a significant problem in most downstate cities.

The 1920s saw the widespread appearance across the nation of a newly formed organization the second Ku Klux Klan (KKK) . Illinois had about 200,000 members. Membership was secret but historians have discovered old lists and report that members came from a cross section of middle class and working class white Protestants, both urban and rural. The new KKK presented itself as a "morality police" in favor of prohibition. Its political agenda was strongly nativist, targeting Catholics especially, while supporting restriction on immigration and advocating for "100% Americanism" and traditional Protestant values. The many local Klan chapters organized parades and burned crosses at nighttime rallies, but were poorly led and seldom cooperated with each other. However, in the coal mining districts, especially in Williamson County in southern Illinois, Klansmen and bootleggers engaged in. bloody attacks and counterattacks. The Klan collapsed and practically disappeared in the late 1920s.

=== Depression and war, 1929 to 1945 ===
{{Further| Great Depression in the United Stareceived. Bankrutcy hit the huge network of electric utilities run by Samuel Insull, hurting 600,000 stockholders and 500,000 bondholders. However, the great majority of large businesses survived by cutting back operations and laying off workers. Small businesses often closed. Urban unemployment soared to 25%. Corporate hiring offices typically turned away inexperienced young people, and rarely hired anyone over the age of 50. It was standard practice in many government and private organizations to have a policy against employing both the husband and the wife. Typically only the main breadwinner—the husband—was retained. In Chicago ethnic commnities operated 199 small neighborhood banks in the booming 1920s. They specialized in financing mortgages for their community. As incomes dropped rents went unpaid, families had to spend their savings, and housing prices plunged. That meant that the old mortgage was costing far more money than the house was worth, and foreclosure was the safest policy. The banks lost heavily on their mortgages. By 1933, only 33 of the 199 survived. Frustrated depositors eventually received about 80 cents on their dollar. Local charity operations were soon overwhelmed, including the Catholic Charities, Jewish Charities, Salvation Army, United Charities, and the Chicago Chapter of the American Red Cross. Chicago's city government was virtually insolvent even before the stock market crash of late 1929 due to a fiscal crisis and a widespread tax strike. Psychologically, people coped and doubled up or tripled up. Teenagers stayed in school longer, which paid off in the long run. Older boys from impoverished families took to the road so their siblings would have more to eat. Illinois families suffered and survived and promised themselves never again.

=== World War II ===
World War II ended the depression, as federal money poured into the city and people who were unemployed or on relief were hired by factories. Washington's policy on war contracts was to pay all the wages, but companies realized that with most young men headed to the army and navy there would be a shortage of workers, so they hired as many people as fast as possible, including youths, women and the elderly. People now had money and paid off old debts. Rationing of food and a shortage of new houses meant that the extra cash went into savings. Marriages were no longer postponed—indeed with the draft looming couples married as soon as possible. The baby boom began. All the ingredients were in place for a spectacular boom into the suburbs as soon as the soldiers returned home in 1946.

=== Great Migration of Blacks to Chicago ===
The Great Migrations from 1910 to 1960 brought hundreds of thousands of Black Americans from the rural South to Chicago. Some also came to East St. Louis. They had been locked into rural poverty, with very poor prospects for education, medical care, or decent housing. With the cutoff of immigration from Europe in 1914, and the surge in military spending during World War I, there were many job openings in Chicago. They created churches, community organizations, businesses, music, and literature. African Americans of all classes built a community on the South Side of Chicago for decades before the Civil Rights Movement, as well as on the West Side of Chicago. Residing in segregated communities, almost regardless of income, the Black residents of Chicago aimed to create communities where they could survive, sustain themselves, and have the ability to shape better lives.

The 800,000 African Americans accounted for 29% of the city's population as of the 2020 census. As per 2023 Census estimates the metro area had just under 1.5 million residents claiming Black alone ancestry, making it the metropolitan area with the fourth-highest Black population after New York, Atlanta, and Washington DC.

=== Politics after 1945 ===
Democrat Adlai Stevenson served as governor in 1948–1952. William G. Stratton led a Republican statehouse in the 1950s. In 1960 Otto Kerner Jr. led the Democrats back to power. He promoted economic development, education, mental health services, and equal access to jobs and housing. In a federal trial in 1973, Kerner was convicted on 17 counts of bribery while he was governor, plus other charges; he went to prison. Richard B. Ogilvie, a Republican, won in 1968. Bolstered by large Republican majorities in the state house, Ogilvie embarked upon a major modernization of state government. He successfully advocated for a state constitutional convention, increased social spending, and secured Illinois' first state income tax. The latter was particularly unpopular with the electorate, and the modest Ogilvie lost a close election to the flashy Democrat Dan Walker in 1972. The state constitutional convention of 1970 wrote a new document that was approved by the voters. It modernized government and ended the old system of three-person districts which froze the political system in place.

Walker did not repeal the income tax that Ogilvie had enacted and wedged between machine Democrats and Republicans had little success with the Illinois legislature during his tenure. In 1987 he was convicted of business crimes not related to his governorship. In the 1976 gubernatorial election, Jim Thompson, a Republican prosecutor from Chicago won 65 percent of the vote over Michael Howlett. Thompson was reelected in 1978 with 60 percent of the vote, defeating State Superintendent Michael Bakalis. Thompson was very narrowly reelected in 1982 against former U.S. Senator Adlai E. Stevenson III (the son of the presidential candidate in 1952 and 1956), and then won decisively in a rematch in 1986.

Thompson was succeeded by Republican Jim Edgar who won a close race in 1990 against his Democratic opponent, attorney general Neil Hartigan, and was reelected in 1994 by a wide margin against another Democratic opponent, state comptroller and former state senator Dawn Clark Netsch. In the elections of 1992 and 1994, the Republicans succeeded in capturing both houses of the state legislature and all statewide offices, putting Edgar in a very strong political position. He advocated increases in funding for education along with cuts in government employment, spending and welfare programs.

Edgar was succeeded as governor by yet another Republican, George H. Ryan. Ryan worked for extensive repairs of the Illinois Highway System called "Illinois FIRST". FIRST was an acronym for "Fund for Infrastructure, Roads, Schools, and Transit". Signed into law in May 1999, the law created a $6.3 billion package for use in school and transportation projects. With various matching funds programs, Illinois FIRST provided $2.2 billion for schools, $4.1 billion for public transportation, another $4.1 billion for roads, and $1.6 billion for other projects. In 1993 Illinois became the first Midwestern state to elect a black person to the US senate before the term of Carol Moseley Braun.

== 21st century ==
Ryan gained national attention in January 2003 when he commuted the sentences of everyone on or waiting to be sent to death row in Illinois—a total of 167 convicts—due to his belief that the death penalty was incapable of being administered fairly. Ryan's term was marked by scandals; he was convicted of corruption in federal court and sent to prison.

Rod Blagojevich, elected in 2002, was the first Democratic governor in a quarter century. Illinois was trending sharply toward the Democratic party in both national and state elections. After the 2002 elections, Democrats had control of the House, Senate, and all but one statewide office. Blagojevich signed numerous pieces of progressive legislation such as ethics reform, death penalty reform, a state Earned Income Tax Credit, and expansions of health programs like KidCare and FamilyCare. Blagojevich signed a bill in 2005 that prohibited discrimination based on sexual orientation in employment, housing, public accommodations, and credit. Other notable actions of his term include a strict new ethics law and a comprehensive death penalty reform bill. Despite an annual budget crunch, Blagojevich oversaw an increase in funding for health care every year without raising general sales or income taxes. Republicans claimed that he simply passed the state's fiscal problems on to future generations by borrowing to balance budgets. Indeed, the 2005 state budget called for paying the bills by shorting the state employees' pension fund by $1.2 billion, which led to a backlash among educators. In December 2008, Blagojevich was arrested on charges of conspiracy and solicitation to commit bribery with regard to appointing a U.S. Senator. He was convicted in federal court and sent to prison.

=== Financial crisis ===
Pat Quinn became governor on January 29, 2009, after Blagojevich was removed from office. Quinn was elected to a full term in office in the 2010 gubernatorial election. As governor he faced severe short-term budget shortfalls and a long-term state debt, all in the context of the worst national economic slump since the Great Depression of the 1930s. Quinn has pushed for spending cuts and tax increases, while trying to raise ethical standards, protect public-sector labor unions, and maintain environmental standards. Quinn faced a state with a reputation for corruption—the two previous governors both went to federal prison—and after two years polls showed Quinn himself was the "Nation's most unpopular governor." Quinn in 2012 feared Illinois was "on the verge of a financial meltdown because of pension systems eating up every new dollar and health care costs climbing through the roof." The state for decades had underfunded its pension system for state employees. By early 2013 the main issue remained a financial crisis in meeting the state's budget and its long-term debt as the national economic slump—the Great Recession—continued and Illinois did poorly in terms of creating jobs. In May 2013, Illinois' state (public) universities, colleges, and community colleges agreed, pending formation and passage of the legislation before the end of the state's legislative session, at Illinois House Speaker Michael Madigan and other members' repeated urging, to gradually assume more of the burden- half of a percent of the retirement and pension costs per fiscal year starting in 2015 (it would likely take roughly 10 to 20 years for them to assume the full cost; school districts likely will have to do the same at some point- Chicago Public Schools already bear the entire cost). Programs will likely be cut, tuition will probably keep on being raised too, and property taxes also might well increase, but it would make a sizable dent in the almost $100 billion unfunded retiree pension liability that is a large part of the state's fiscal crisis.

== Famous people ==
Most pre-1940 names have been selected from the WPA Guide This is a list of people from Illinois; people are not included if they left the state before beginning a career.

=== Before 1940 ===
- Jane Addams, social work
- Philip D. Armour, business
- Louis Armstrong, music
- Edward Beecher, religion
- Lydia Moss Bradley, philanthropy
- Daniel H. Burnham, architect
- Joseph Gurney Cannon, politics, GOP
- Anton Cermak, politics, Dem
- John Coughlin, politics, Dem
- Clarence Darrow, law
- John Dewey, philosophy
- Stephen A. Douglas, politics, Dem
- Finley Peter Dunne, author
- Ninian Edwards, politics
- James T. Farrell, author
- Theodore Dreiser, author
- Eugene Field, author
- Marshall Field I, business
- Thomas Ford, politics, Dem
- John T. Frederick, literature
- Lyman J. Gage, business
- Ulysses S. Grant, general and president
- Red Grange, sports
- Frank W. Gunsaulus, education
- William Rainey Harper, education
- Carter Harrison II, politics, Dem
- Carter Harrison IV, politics, Dem
- George Peter Alexander Healy, artist
- Ben Hecht, author
- William Holabird, architect
- Raymond Hood, architect
- Henry Horner, politics, Dem
- Robert Maynard Hutchins, education
- Robert Ingersoll, religion
- Samuel Insull, business
- William Le Baron Jenney, architect
- Leslie Keeley, medicine
- Florence Kelley, social work
- John Kinzie, settler
- Frank Knox, newspapers
- Christian C. Kohlsaat, judge
- H. H. Kohlsaat, newspapers
- René-Robert Cavelier, Sieur de La Salle, explorer
- Julia C. Lathrop, social work
- Victor F. Lawson, newspapers
- Abraham Lincoln, politics, Whig, GOP, president
- Mary Todd Lincoln, Lincoln's wife
- Robert Todd Lincoln, Lincoln's son
- Vachel Lindsay, author
- John A. Logan, politics, Dem, GOP
- Frank O. Lowden, politics, GOP
- Cyrus Hall McCormick, business
- Robert R. McCormick, newspapers
- James Robert Mann, politics, GOP
- Edgar Lee Masters, author
- Joseph Medill, newspapers
- Charles E. Merriam, political science
- Harriet Monroe, poet
- Dwight L. Moody, religion
- William Vaughn Moody, author
- George Mundelein, Roman Catholic archbishop and cardinal
- William Butler Ogden, business
- Richard James Oglesby, politics, GOP
- John M. Palmer, politics, GOP, Dem
- Potter Palmer, business
- Bertha Palmer, society
- Francis W. Parker, education
- John Mason Peck, author
- Jean Baptiste Point du Sable, settler
- George M. Pullman, business
- Henry T. Rainey, politics, Dem
- Ronald Reagan (1911–2004), 40th President of the United States, GOP
- John W. Root, architect
- Julius Rosenwald, business and philanthropy
- E. W. Scripps, newspapers
- Richard Warren Sears, business
- Albion W. Small, sociology
- Joseph Smith, religion
- John Spalding, religion
- Amos Alonzo Stagg, sports
- Ellen Gates Starr, social work
- Bernard James Sheil, religion
- Melville E. Stone, newspapers
- Adlai Stevenson, politics; Vice President, Dem
- Gustavus F. Swift, business
- Graham R. Taylor, social work
- Theodore Thomas, conductor
- Lyman Trumbull, politics, Dem, GOP, Dem
- Jonathan Baldwin Turner, education
- Charles Rudolph Walgreen, business
- A. Montgomery Ward, business
- John Wentworth, politics, Dem, GOP
- Frances E Willard, social activist, head of the Woman's Christian Temperance Union
- Frank Lloyd Wright, architect
- Richard Yates, politics, GOP
- Charles Yerkes, business

=== Recent ===
- Saul Alinsky (1909–1972), politics
- John Bardeen (1908–1991) winner of two Nobel prizes in physics
- Joseph Bernardin (1928–1996), Catholic archbishop and cardinal
- Gwendolyn Brooks 1917–2000), poet; first African American to receive a Pulitzer Prize.
- Richard J. Daley (1902–1976), Chicago mayor; Dem
- Richard M. Daley (born 1942), Chicago mayor, son of Richard J. Daley; Dem
- Everett Dirksen (1896-1969), politics, GOP
- Enrico Fermi(1901-1954), nuclear physics
- Marshall Field III (1893-1956), business
- Andrew Greeley (1928–2013), author; Catholic religion; sociology
- George Halas, (1895–1983), sports
- Jackie Joyner-Kersee, (born 1962), sports, philanthropist
- Ray Kroc (1902-1984). business
- Robert H. Michel, (born 1923), politics, GOP
- Ludwig Mies van der Rohe, (1886–1969), architect
- Barack Obama (born 1961), politics, Dem; president of the U.S. 2009–2017.
- William Shockley, (1910–1989), physicist invented transistor
- Adlai Stevenson II (1908–1965), politics, Dem
- Harold Washington (1922–1987), politics, Dem

== See also ==
- Frontier Illinois
- History of Chicago
  - History of education in Chicago
  - History of African Americans in Chicago
- History of the Midwestern United States
- Women's suffrage in Illinois
- List of historical sites related to the Illinois labor movement
- List of historical societies in Illinois

== Sources ==
- Nash, Gary B. (2000). Red, White and Black: The Peoples of Early North America. Los Angeles. ISBN 9780139567568.
