= Demographics of Illinois =

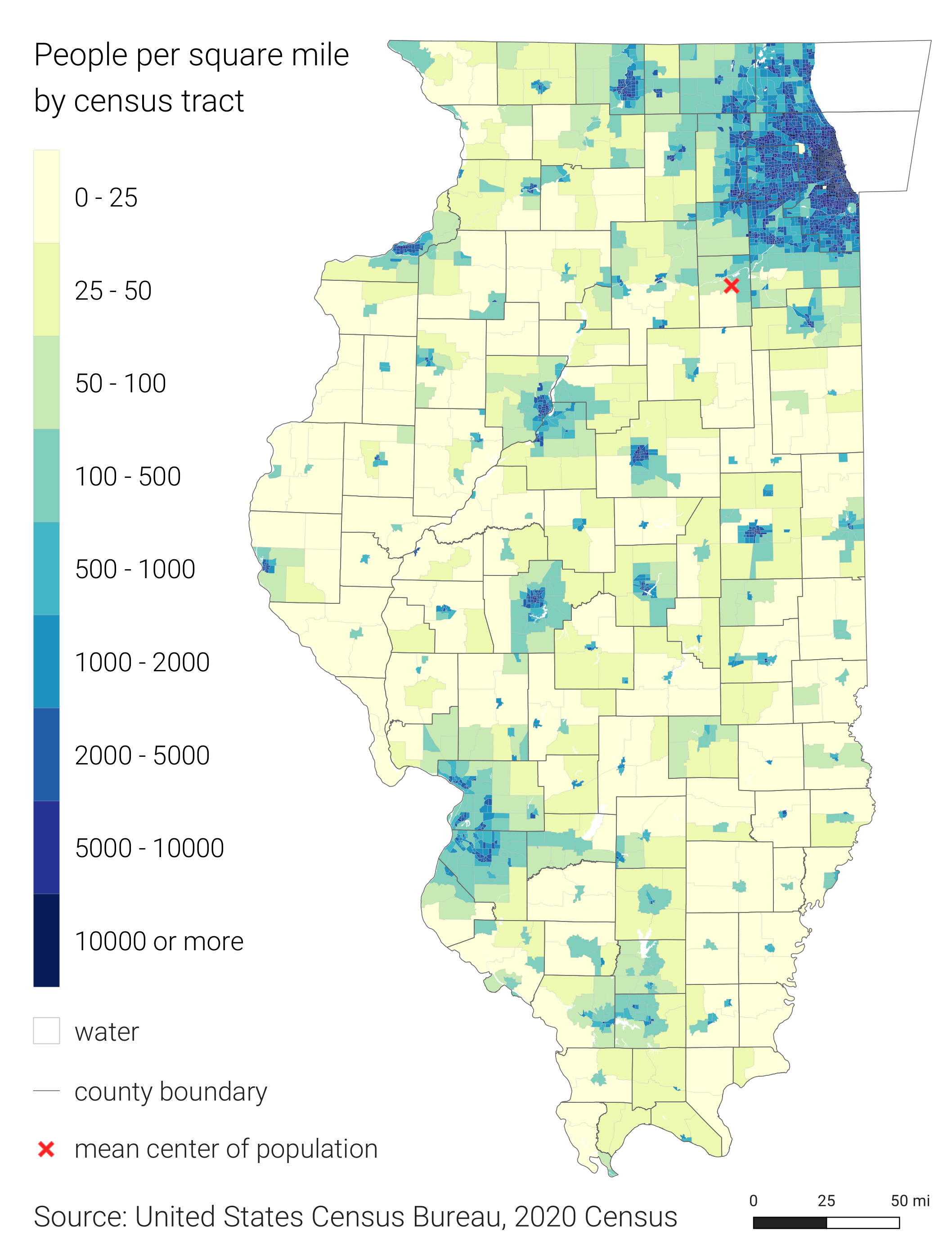
Illinois 2020 population density map

The United States Census Bureau found that the population of Illinois was 12,812,508 in the 2020 United States census, moving from the fifth-largest state to the sixth-largest state (losing out to Pennsylvania). Illinois' population slightly declined in 2020 from the 2010 United States census by just over 18,000 residents and the overall population was quite higher than recent census estimates.

Illinois is the most populous state in the Midwest region. Chicago, the third-most populous city in the United States, is the center of the Chicago metropolitan area or Chicagoland, as this area is nicknamed. Although the Chicago metropolitan area comprises only 9% of the land area of the state, it contains 75% of the state's residents, with 21.4% of Illinois' population living in the city of Chicago itself as of 2020. The five most populous counties in the state, as of 2024, are Cook (5,182,617), DuPage (937,142), Lake (718,604), Will (708,583), and Kane (520,997), all located in the Chicago metropolitan area. While the state's population has declined in recent years, according to the 2020 census, these losses do not arise from the Chicago metro area; rather the declines are from the Downstate counties. As of the 2020 census, the state's geographic mean center of population is located at 41° 18′ 43″N 88° 22 23″W in Grundy County, about six miles northwest of Coal City.

Illinois is the most racially and ethnically diverse state in the Midwestern United States. By several metrics, including racial and ethnic background, religious affiliation, and percentage of rural and urban divide, Illinois is the most representative of the larger demography of the United States.

Historical population
Census	Pop.	Note	%±
1800	2,458		—
1810	12,282		399.7%
1820	55,211		349.5%
1830	157,445		185.2%
1840	476,183		202.4%
1850	851,470		78.8%
1860	1,711,951		101.1%
1870	2,539,891		48.4%
1880	3,077,871		21.2%
1890	3,826,352		24.3%
1900	4,821,550		26.0%
1910	5,638,591		16.9%
1920	6,485,280		15.0%
1930	7,630,654		17.7%
1940	7,897,241		3.5%
1950	8,712,176		10.3%
1960	10,081,158		15.7%
1970	11,113,976		10.2%
1980	11,426,518		2.8%
1990	11,430,602		0.0%
2000	12,419,293		8.6%
2010	12,830,632		3.3%
2020	12,812,508		−0.1%
2025 (est.)	12,719,141		−0.7%
Source: 1910–2020

== Race and ethnicity ==
Illinois – Racial and ethnic composition Note: the US Census treats Hispanic/Latino as an ethnic category. This table excludes Latinos from the racial categories and assigns them to a separate category. Hispanics/Latinos may be of any race.
Race / Ethnicity (NH = Non-Hispanic)	Pop 1980	Pop 1990	Pop 2000	Pop 2010	Pop 2020	% 1980	% 1990	% 2000	% 2010	% 2020
White alone (NH)	8,911,705	8,550,208	8,424,140	8,167,753	7,472,751	77.99%	74.80%	67.83%	63.66%	58.32%
Black or African American alone (NH)	1,661,910	1,673,703	1,856,152	1,832,924	1,775,612	14.54%	14.64%	14.95%	14.29%	13.86%
Native American or Alaska Native alone (NH)	16,283	18,213	18,232	18,849	16,561	0.14%	0.16%	0.15%	0.15%	0.13%
Asian alone (NH)	159,595	275,568	419,916	580,586	747,280	1.40%	2.41%	3.38%	4.52%	5.83%
Native Hawaiian or Pacific Islander alone (NH)	x (Note: included in the Asian category in the 1980 Census)	x (Note: included in the Asian category in the 1990 Census)	3,116	2,977	2,959	x	x	0.03%	0.02%	0.02%
Other race alone (NH)	41,423	8,464	13,479	16,008	45,080	0.36%	0.07%	0.11%	0.12%	0.35%
Mixed race or Multiracial (NH)	x (Note: not an option in the 1980 Census)	x (Note: not an option in the 1990 Census)	153,996	183,957	414,855	x	x	1.24%	1.43%	3.24%
Hispanic or Latino (any race)	635,602	904,446	1,530,262	2,027,578	2,337,410	5.56%	7.91%	12.32%	15.80%	18.24%
Total	11,426,518	11,430,602	12,419,293	12,830,632	12,812,508	100.00%	100.00%	100.00%	100.00%	100.00%

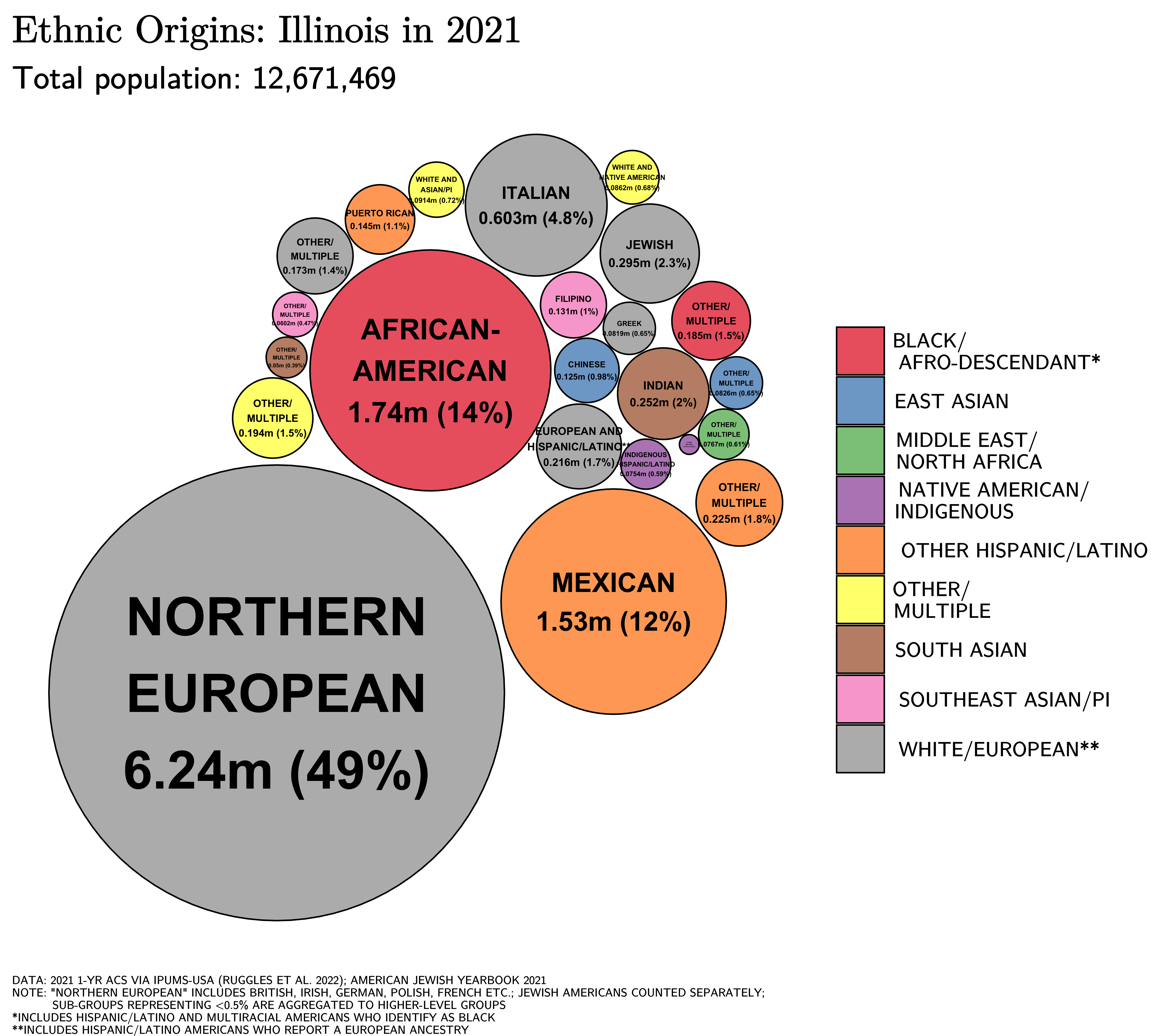
Ethnic origins in Illinois Largest alone or in any combination ethnic origin by county in Illinois, per the 2020 census

Map of counties in Illinois by racial plurality, per the 2020 U.S. census Non-Hispanic White: 40–50% 50–60% 60–70% 70–80% 80–90% 90%+

Ethnic composition as of the 2020 census
Race and ethnicity	Alone	Total
White (non-Hispanic)	58.3%	61.3%
Hispanic or Latino (Note: Persons of Hispanic or Latino origin are not distinguished between total and partial ancestry.)	—	18.2%
African American (non-Hispanic)	13.9%	15.0%
Asian	5.8%	6.7%
Native American	0.1%	1.1%
Pacific Islander	0.02%	0.1%
Other	0.4%	1.1%

Illinois Racial Breakdown of Population
Racial composition	1940	1950	1960	1970	1980	1990	2000	2010	2020
White	95.0%	92.4%	89.4%	86.4%	80.8%	78.3%	73.5%	71.5%	61.4%
Black	4.9%	7.4%	10.3%	12.8%	14.7%	14.8%	15.1%	14.5%	14.1%
Asian	0.1%	0.2%	0.2%	0.4%	1.4%	2.5%	3.4%	4.6%	5.9%
Native American	0%	0%	0%	0.1%	0.1%	0.2%	0.2%	0.3%	0.8%
Pacific Islander	—	—	—	—	—	—	0.0%	0.0%	0.0%
'Some Other race'	—	—	—	0.2%	3%	4.2%	5.8%	6.7%	8.9%
Two or more races	—	—	—	—	—	—	1.9%	2.3%	8.9%
Hispanic or Latino (Any race)	0.3% (Note: Estimate based on the white population "of Spanish mother tongue" in the 1940 Census. Prior to the introduction of 'some other race' as a census category, the vast majority of Hispanics were counted as white, but this estimate may still exclude some non-white Hispanics and those of Hispanic heritage who didn't speak Spanish.)	—	—	3.3%	5.6%	7.9%	12.3%	15.8%	18.2%
Non-Hispanic white	94.7%	—	—	83.5%	78%	74.8%	67.8%	63.7%	58.3%
Non-Hispanic black	—	—	—	12.6%	14.6%	14.7%	15.0%	14.3%	13.9%
Non-Hispanic Asian	—	—	—	0.4%	1.4%	2.4%	3.4%	4.5%	5.8%
Non-Hispanic Native American	—	—	—	0.1%	0.1%	0.2%	0.2%	0.2%	0.1%
Non-Hispanic 'Some other race'	—	—	—	0.2%	0.4%	0.1%	0.1%	0.1%	0.4%
Non-Hispanic two or more races	—	—	—	—	—	—	1.2%	1.4%	3.2%

=== 2025 American Community Survey one-year estimates ===
Racial Makeup of Illinois (2025): 1. White alone (59.0%); 2. Black alone (13.4%); 3. Native American alone (0.94%); 4. Asian Alone (6.60%); 5. Pacific Islander Alone (0.03%); 6. Other race alone (8.85%); 7. Two or more races (11.1%)	Racial/Ethnic Makeup of Illinois excluding Hispanics from racial categories (2025); NH=Non-Hispanic: 1. White NH (55.8%); 2. Black NH (13.2%); 3. Native American NH (0.17%); 4. Asian NH (6.53%); 5. Pacific Islander NH (0.02%); 6. Other race NH (0.38%); 7. Two or more races NH (4.05%); 8. Hispanic Any Race (19.8%)	Racial Makeup of Hispanics in Illinois (2025): 1. White alone (16.1%); 2. Black alone (1.10%); 3. Native American alone (3.88%); 4. Asian Alone (0.38%); 5. Pacific Islander Alone (0.06%); 6. Other race alone (42.8%); 7. Two or more races (35.7%)

According to 2025 U.S. Census Bureau one-year estimates (with Hispanics allocated amongst the various racial groups), Illinois' population was 59.0% White, 13.4% Black or African American, 0.9% Native American or Alaskan Native, 6.6% Asian, 0.1% Pacific Islander, 8.9% Some Other Race, and 11.1% from two or more races. The white population continues to remain the largest racial category in Illinois. Under this methodology, Hispanics are allocated amongst the various racial groups and primarily identify as Some Other Race (42.8.0%) or Multiracial (35.7%) with the remainder identifying as White (16.1%), Black (1.1%), American Indian and Alaskan Native (3.9%), Asian (0.4%), and Hawaiian and Pacific Islander (0.1%). By ethnicity, 19.8% of the total population is Hispanic-Latino (of any race) and 80.2% is Non-Hispanic (of any race). Illinois has the largest share of Hispanic residents in the Midwest, with over 37% of Hispanics in the region living in Illinois.

=== Hispanic Americans ===
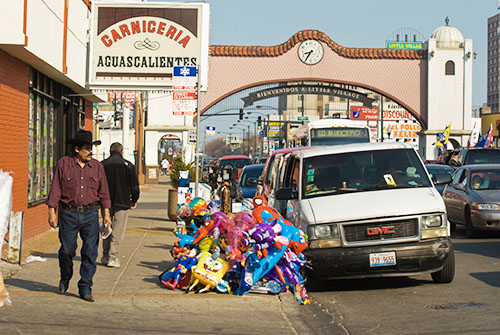
Little Village neighborhood in Chicago

If treated as a separate category, Hispanics are the largest minority group in Illinois, making up nearly a fifth of the population. About 75% of the state's Hispanic population is Mexican-American, numbering 1,794,369 and making up 14.3% of the total population of the state. Illinois is home to the largest population of Mexican descent in the US outside of the Western United States. The second largest Hispanic group in Illinois are Puerto Ricans, numbering 211,676 and making up 9% of the Hispanic population and 1.7% of the total population. The state is also home to significant Central American and South American communities, including 44,373 Guatemalan-Americans, 41,047 Ecuadorian-Americans, and 42,101 Colombian-Americans. Hispanics are the second fastest growing demographic in Illinois after Asians, growing by 15% between 2010 and 2020, while the overall population of the state declined.

The vast majority of Hispanics in Illinois live in Chicago or the surrounding suburbs, with 786,464 Hispanics living in the city of Chicago itself, making up nearly a third of the city's population. Many large suburbs of Chicago, including Aurora, Berwyn, Cicero, Elgin, and Waukegan have either a majority or plurality Hispanic population. The county with the highest share of Hispanic residents in the state, at 33.5% of the population, is Kane County, located on the western edge of the Chicago suburbs and including the cities of Elgin and Aurora. Hispanics have the lowest per-capita income of any major ethnic or racial group in Illinois, at $28,541. However, the Hispanic poverty rate, at 14.1%, is lower than that of Black residents, who have a poverty rate of 23%. Hispanic residents are the youngest demographic group in Illinois, with a median age of 30.7.

While those of Hispanic ethnicity are not distinguished between total and partial Hispanic origin, 2021 estimates show that almost 10% of the state's Hispanic population also reported a non-Spanish European ancestry, with this group making up 1.7% of the state's total population.

=== African-Americans ===
Black Americans form the second largest minority group in Illinois. In 2023, 1,922,259 Illinoisans identified as Black alone or in combination, making up 15.3% of the states population. Of this population, 1,643,638 (13.1%) are non-Hispanic Black alone, while 28,321 identify as Afro-Latino, and 250,300 identify as Black in combination with any other race. While most of the state's Black population identifies as African-American, there are also 45,393 people of West Indian descent and 43,911 of Nigerian descent in the state. A majority of the state's Black population resides in the Chicago metropolitan area, with 42% living in Chicago itself.

According to a study from the Brookings Institution, the Chicago area has the third highest level of black-white residential segregation in the United States. While some areas, including many neighborhoods on the city's west side and south side, as well as many suburbs in the Chicago Southland, are majority Black, most neighborhoods on the north and northwest sides of Chicago, as well as most of the northern and southwestern suburbs of the city, have very small Black populations.

Outside of Chicagoland, urban areas in Southern and Central Illinois, including the Metro East, Peoria, Springfield, and Decatur also have significant Black populations. The counties with the highest share of Black residents in Illinois are Pulaski and Alexander County, located at the southern tip of the state along the banks of the Ohio and Mississippi rivers in the region known as "Little Egypt", with Black residents making up 32% of the population in both counties.

The per-capita income of Black residents, at $30,295, is the second lowest of all major ethnic or racial groups in the state, after Hispanics of any race. However, Black Illinoisans have the highest overall poverty rate of all groups in the state, at 23%. The median age of Black residents in Illinois is 36.8 years.

Illinois has a long history of milestones regarding African American involvement in politics. It was the first state to elect a Black person to the U.S. House of Representatives in the post-reconstruction era, with the election of Oscar De Priest in 1928. It was also the first state to elect a Black woman to the US Senate, with the election of Carol Moseley Braun in 1992. Illinois senator Barack Obama would become the first Black president of the United States following his victory in the 2008 presidential election.

=== Asian-Americans ===
The third largest minority group in Illinois are Asian-Americans. In 2023, 894,048 Illinoisans identified as being Asian alone or in combination, making up 7.1% of the state's population. 756,661 identified as Asian alone, making up 6.0% of the population. The state's Asian-American population has grown rapidly in recent decades, from only 2.5% of the total population in 1990, to over 7% in 2023.

About 37% of the state's Asian population is of South Asian origin, 31% are East Asian, 29% are Southeast Asian (Mostly Filipino), 1% are Central Asian, and 2% are of 'unspecified' Asian origins. The largest specific Asian groups in the state are Indian (277,961), Filipino (184,508), Chinese (160,880), Korean (67,452), and Pakistani (50,508). About 85% of the state's Asian-American population identifies as Asian alone, while 15% identify as multiracial. Illinoisans of South Asian ancestry are significantly less likely than other Asian-Americans in the state to report multiracial ancestry, with 94% of Indian-Americans and 90% of Pakistani-Americans in the state identifying as Asian alone, compared to 82% of Chinese-American residents, 73% of Filipino-American residents, and only 44% of the state's 33,000 Japanese-American residents.

The overwhelming majority of the state's Asian population resides in the Chicago metropolitan area, mostly in suburban areas. Suburban DuPage County has the highest share of Asian residents in the state, at 14.7%. While Asians aren't the majority in any municipality within Illinois, they make up a significant share of the population (between 20 and 40%) in multiple western and northern suburbs of Chicago, including Naperville, Schaumburg, Hoffman Estates, Skokie, Niles, and Morton Grove. Additionally, the Chicago community area of Armour Square, which includes the city's Chinatown neighborhood, is majority Asian at 63.7% of the population. Asian residents have the highest per-capita income of any major ethnic or racial group in the state, at $54,122, and the second lowest poverty rate, after non-Hispanic whites, at 10.4%. The median age of single-race Asian residents in Illinois is 38.9 years. Illinois senator Tammy Duckworth, of Thai descent, is one of only three Asian Americans currently serving in the US Senate.

=== Native Americans ===
In 2023, 271,494 Illinoisans identified as Native American alone or in combination, making up 2.2% of the state's population. 184,155 Illinoisans identified as Native American in combination with any other race, while 87,339 identified as being Native American alone. Over 80% of the state's Native American population also identified as being Hispanic or Latino, with only 12,385, or 0.1% of the population, identifying as non-Hispanic Native American alone. According to the 2023 American Community Survey, the largest self-identified Indigenous groups in the state were Aztec (53,815) and Maya (17,866). The largest non-Latin American Indigenous groups in the state were Blackfeet (8,674) and Navajo (3,950).

=== Pacific Islanders ===
The state has a very small number of Pacific Islanders, numbering 17,982 and making only 0.1% of the population in 2023. The majority of Pacific Islanders in the state identify as multiracial, with only 5,852 identifying as Pacific Islander alone. The largest Pacific Islander groups in the state are Native Hawaiians (6,362), Samoans (2,211), and Chamorros (1,519).

=== European-Americans ===
In 2023, 7,260,529 Illinoisans identified as non-Hispanic white alone, making up 57.9% of the population. Although a majority of white residents in the state live in the Chicago area, the counties with the highest percent share of white population are all located in rural areas with smaller populations, with non-Hispanic white people making up over 80 or 90% of the population in most non-urban counties in the state.

In the Chicago metro area, the white population is located mostly in suburban areas, with non-Hispanic white residents making up a majority of the population (between 53% and 75%) in every metropolitan county other than Cook County, while making up only 31.7% of the population in the city of Chicago itself. Within Chicago, there is significant racial segregation, with the white population concentrated primarily on the North Side of the city, while many predominantly African-American or Hispanic neighborhoods on the West Side and South Side of the city have almost no non-Hispanic white residents.

The largest European ancestry reported in Illinois is German. 1,983,050 Illinoisans, or 15.8% of the total population, identify with German ancestry, making it the single largest ancestry group in the state. German ancestry predominates among the white population in every county in northern Illinois, as well as most counties in the southwestern part of the state, while English-Americans, making up 6.8% of Illinois' population, predominate in most of the southeastern counties. The state's white population also includes a large number of Irish (10.5%), Polish (6.1%), and Italian-Americans (5.5%), with these groups concentrated mainly in Chicago and the surrounding suburbs. Illinois' Polish-American population of 761,948 is the highest out of any state. The state is also home to a significant population of other Eastern European ethnicities, also largely concentrated around the Chicago area, including 86,814 Russians, 83,679 Czechs, 71,279 Ukrainians, and 35,407 Croatians.

Most Illinoisans who report any European ancestry identify with multiple ancestries. Those of partial descent make up the majority of most European ancestry groups in Illinois, including 58% of Polish-Americans, 68% of English-Americans, 69% of German-Americans, and 75% of Irish-Americans in the state. Of all European ancestries numbering over 50,000 in Illinois, those identifying solely with that ancestry are only a majority among the state's 71,279 Ukrainian-Americans, with two thirds of this group identifying as Ukrainian alone.

Along with white residents reporting multiple European ancestries, about 3% of the state's population identifies as non-Hispanic white in combination with another racial group. Additionally, while those of Hispanic ethnicity are not distinguished between total and partial Hispanic origin, an estimated 1.7% of Illinois' population are Hispanics who report a non-Spanish European ancestry.

Non-Hispanic whites have the second highest per-capita income of any racial group in the state, at $53,591, just slightly below that of Asians. The white poverty rate, at only 8.3%, is the lowest of all major racial or ethnic groups in the state, including Asians. The median age of non-Hispanic white residents is the oldest of all racial or ethnic groups in the state, at 44.2 years.

=== Arab Americans ===
The state is home to a significant Middle Eastern population, with 101,464 people (0.8% of the population) identifying as Arab. (Note: Arabs and other Middle Eastern Americans are classified as racially 'white' by the Census Bureau) 71,422, (0.6% of the population) identify as Arab alone. The highest concentration of Arab-Americans in the state are found in the southern suburbs of Chicago, in the towns of Brigeview, Oak Lawn, Palos Hills, and Hickory Hills, where they make up between 5–12% of the population.

Illinois has the largest Palestinian population in the United States. According to census estimates, 19,255 Illinoisans have Palestinian ancestry, while other estimates place the population of Palestinian descent in the Chicago area as high as 85,000.

=== Demographic Trends ===
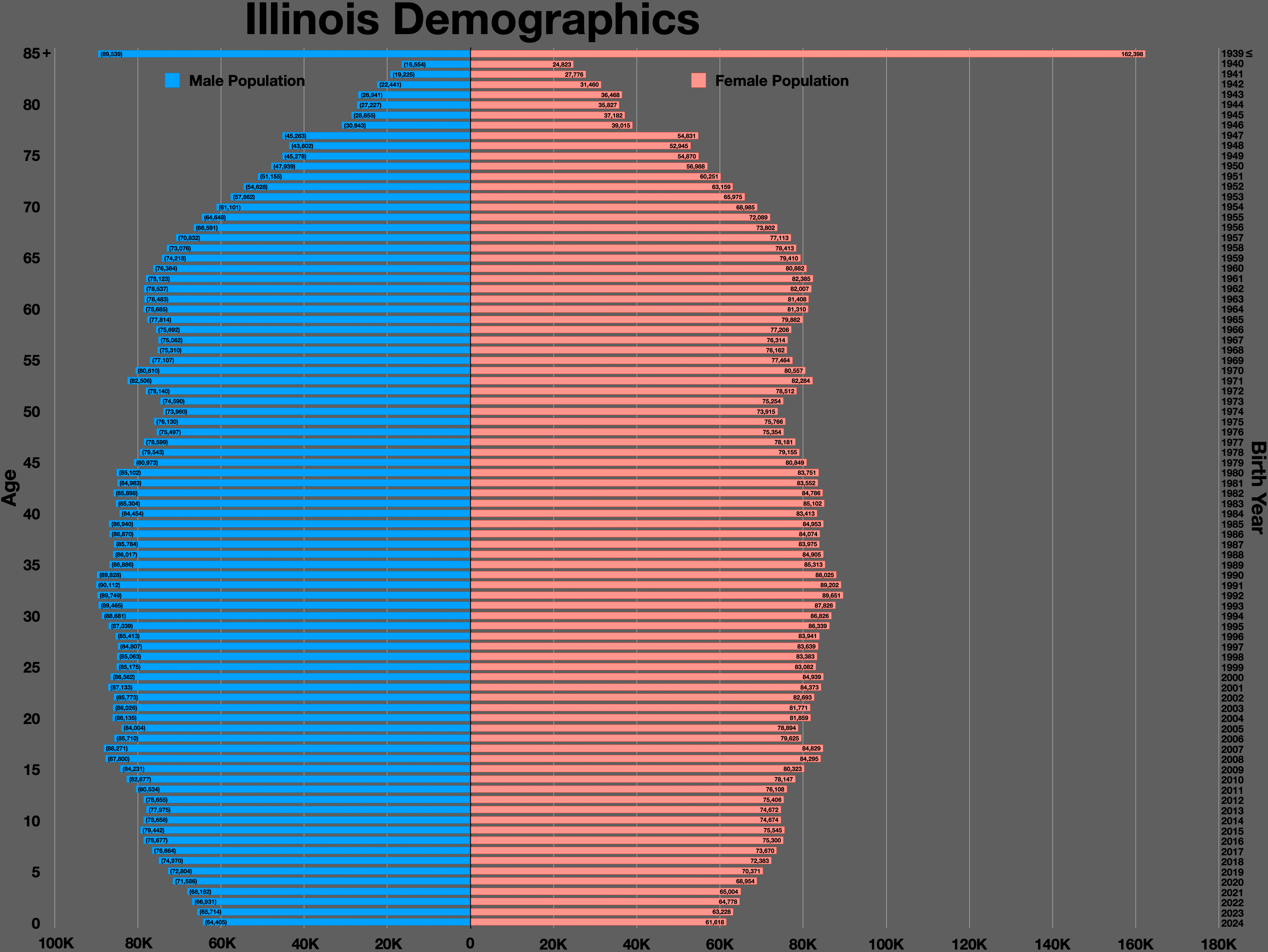
Illinois population pyramid

As of 2023, 50% of Illinois's population younger than age 18 were minorities. This marks an increase from 2010, when 47% of children in the state were minorities, and 2000, when 41% were minorities. (Note: Children born to white Hispanics or to a sole full or partial minority parent are counted as minorities. Arabs are classified as white in census data.).

The state's most populous ethnic group, non-Hispanic white, has declined from 83.5% in 1970 to 58.5% in 2022. Almost 60% of Illinois' minority population, including over 67% of the black population, lives in Cook County, while the county includes about 40% of the state's total population. Cook County, which is home to Chicago, is the only majority-minority county within Illinois, with non-Hispanic whites making up a plurality of 40.4% of the population. Despite being the most ethnically diverse state in the Midwest, urban areas in Illinois have had a persistently high level of racial segregation, with a study from the Brookings Institution finding that the Chicago area has the third highest level of black-white residential segregation out of all major metropolitan areas in the United States.

== Ancestry ==
According to 2022 estimates from the American Community Survey, 16% of the population had German ancestry, 14% had Mexican ancestry, 10.4% had Irish ancestry, 7.1% had English ancestry, 6.2% had Polish ancestry, 5.2% had Italian ancestry, 3.4% listed themselves as American, 2.3% had Indian ancestry, 1.7% had Puerto Rican ancestry, 1.7% had Swedish ancestry, 1.4% had Filipino ancestry, 1.4% had French ancestry, and 1.2% had Chinese ancestry. The state also has a large population of African-Americans, making up 15.3% of the population alone or in combination. This table displays all self-reported ancestries with over 50,000 members in Illinois, alone or in combination, according to estimates from the 2022 American Community Survey. Hispanic groups are not distinguished between total and partial ancestry:

Ancestry	Number in 2022 (Alone)	Number as of 2022 (Alone or in any combination)	% Total
German	649,997	2,014,297	16.0%
Black or African American (Including Afro-Caribbean & Sub-Saharan African)	1,689,724	1,931,027	15.3%
Mexican	—	1,759,842	14.0%
Irish	338,198	1,312,888	10.4%
English	278,564	891,189	7.1%
Polish	336,810	780,152	6.2%
Italian	205,189	657,830	5.2%
American (Mostly old-stock white Americans of British descent)	345,772	428,431	3.4%
Indian	270,311	287,101	2.3%
Puerto Rican	—	214,835	1.7%
Swedish	48,814	210,128	1.7%
Filipino	131,433	175,619	1.4%
French	27,025	174,964	1.4%
Chinese	130,864	153,277	1.2%
Broadly "European" (No country specified)	114,209	146,671	1.2%
Scottish	33,638	136,636	1.1%
Norwegian	33,099	133,538	1.1%
Dutch	32,184	122,139	1.0%
Arab	74,779	106,612	0.8%
Czech	21,168	83,090	0.7%
Greek	39,290	82,360	0.7%
Russian	27,532	79,623	0.6%
Lithuanian	27,001	73,207	0.6%
Korean	55,515	71,709	0.6%
Scotch-Irish	16,817	60,693	0.5%
Ukrainian	37,306	60,623	0.5%

== Immigration ==
At the 2022 estimates from the U.S. Census Bureau, there were 1,810,100 foreign-born inhabitants of the state or 14.4% of the population, with 37.8% from Mexico or Central America, 31% from Asia, 20.2% from Europe, 4.3% from South America, 4.2% from Africa, 1% from Canada, and 0.2% from Oceania. Of the foreign-born population, 53.5% were naturalized U.S. citizens, and 46.5% were not U.S. citizens. The top countries of origin for immigrants in Illinois were Mexico, India, Poland, the Philippines and China in 2018 and 2023.

Place of birth	Population (2022)	% of total
United States	10,660,218	84.7%
Illinois	8,379,091	66.6%
Other States or D.C.	2,227,917	17.7%
Puerto Rico	50,577	0.4%
Other US Territories	2,633	0.0%
Born abroad to American parents	111,714	0.9%
Mexico & Central America	683,766	5.4%
Mexico	621,541	4.9%
Guatemala	22,886	0.2%
Honduras	13,811	0.1%
El Salvador	12,097	0.1%
Belize	7,150	0.1%
Other Central American countries	6,281	0.0%
Caribbean (Not including Puerto Rico)	25,258	0.2%
Cuba	6,955	0.1%
Jamaica	6,873	0.1%
Haiti	5,265	0.0%
Other Caribbean countries	6,165	0.0%
South America	76,944	0.7%
Colombia	22,796	0.2%
Venezuela	15,387	0.1%
Ecuador	14,356	0.1%
Brazil	9,164	0.1%
Peru	6,426	0.1%
Other South American countries	8,815	0.1%
Northern America	17,775	0.1%
Canada	17,632	0.1%
Other Northern American countries	143	0.0%
Eastern Europe	271,358	2.2%
Poland	120,473	1.0%
Ukraine	33,575	0.3%
Romania	15,452	0.1%
Russia	14,930	0.1%
Bulgaria	13,464	0.1%
Bosnia	11,071	0.1%
Other Eastern European countries	62,393	0.5%
Western Europe	30,076	0.3%
Germany	19,611	0.2%
Other Western European countries	10,465	0.1%
Southern Europe	34,997	0.3%
Italy	18,660	0.1%
Greece	12,463	0.1%
Other Southern European countries	3,874	0.0%
Northern Europe	27,573	0.2%
UK (Including overseas Crown Dependencies)	19,123	0.2%
Ireland	5,465	0.0%
Other Northern European countries	2,985	0.0%
Europe, unspecified country	1,353	0.0%
East Asia	137,098	1.1%
China	77,933	0.7%
Korea (North or South)	37,662	0.3%
Japan	9,905	0.1%
Taiwan	8,995	0.1%
Other East Asian countries	2,603	0.0%
South or Central Asia	231,775	1.8%
India	173,578	1.4%
Pakistan	29,823	0.2%
Bangladesh	5,858	0.0%
Other South or Central Asian countries	22,516	0.2%
Southeast Asia	131,684	1.0%
Philippines	92,569	0.7%
Vietnam	18,559	0.1%
Thailand	5,268	0.0%
Other Southeast Asian countries	15,288	0.1%
West Asia	52,352	0.4%
Iraq	13,341	0.1%
Jordan	8,240	0.1%
Syria	8,130	0.1%
Turkey	5,271	0.0%
Other West Asian countries	17,370	0.1%
Asia, unspecified country	8,366	0.1%
Sub-Saharan Africa	63,590	0.6%
Nigeria	22,648	0.2%
Ghana	6,018	0.0%
Ethiopia	5,069	0.0%
Other Sub-Saharan African countries	29,855	0.3%
North Africa	11,924	0.1%
Africa, unspecified country	2,368	0.0%
Oceania	4,211	0.0%
Total Population	12,582,032	100%

== Age and sex ==
In 2022, 11.2% of Illinois's population was reported as being under the age of 9, 12.9% were between 10 and 19 years old, 13.4% were 20–29 years old, 13.6% were 30–39 years old, 12.6% were 40–49 years old, 12.7% were 50–59 years old, 11.9% were 60–69 years old, 7.7% were 70–79 years old, and 4% were over the age of 80. As of 2023, 21.5% of the population is under the age of 18. The median age in Illinois is 39.1 years.

Females make up approximately 50.5% of the population, while males make up 49.5%. According to a 2022 study from the Williams Institute, an estimated 0.44% of adults in Illinois identify as transgender, a rate slightly lower than the national estimate of 0.52%. According to a Gallup survey from 2019, 4.3% of adults in Illinois identify as LGBTQ.

Age Group	% of total (2022)	Population (2022)
0–9	11.2%	1,409,553
10–19	12.9%	1,628,658
20–29	13.4%	1,683,823
30–39	13.6%	1,709,929
40–49	12.6%	1,579,665
50–59	12.7%	1,596,049
60–69	11.9%	1,501,221
70–79	7.7%	970,961
80+	4%	502,173

== Socioeconomics ==
As of 2023, the per-capita income in Illinois is $45,043, and the median income for a household in the state is $80,306, slightly higher than the national average. 11.6% of the population lives below the poverty line, including 15% of children under 18 and 11% of those over the age of 65. There is significant racial income inequality in the state, with Asians and Non-Hispanic Whites having a per-capita income almost double that of Black and Hispanic residents.

Race/Ethnicity	Per capita income (2023)	Poverty Rate (2023)
Asian	$54,122	10.4%
White (Non-Hispanic)	$53,591	8.3%
All residents	$45,043	11.6%
Black	$30,295	23.0%
Hispanic (Any Race)	$28,541	14.1%

There are 5,071,288 households in Illinois, with an average size of 2.4 people per household. 48% of the population over the age of 15 is married. As of 2023, Illinois' total fertility rate is the 11th lowest of all US states, with a lifetime average of 1.50 births per woman, in comparison to an average of 1.64 on the national level.

90.6% of the adult population has a high school diploma, and 38.3% of the population over 25 has a bachelor's degree or higher, compared to a national average of 36.2%.

In 2022, Illinois scored 0.932 on the UN's Human Development Index, placing it in the category of "very high" Human Development and slightly higher than the US average of 0.927.

According to HUD's 2022 Annual Homeless Assessment Report, there were an estimated 9,212 homeless people in Illinois.

According to 2022 data from the Prison Policy Initiative, an estimated 53,000 people were imprisoned in local jails, state prisons, federal prisons, or detention centers in the state, meaning that about 0.43% of the state's total population was incarcerated. Census data from 2023 reports an estimated 59,254 people (0.47%) imprisoned in adult correctional facilities in the state. However, Illinois' prison incarceration rate has declined by almost 50% since 2014, and the state has the 13th lowest total incarceration rate out of all 50 states.

== Vital statistics by race/ethnicity ==
Live Births by Single Race/Ethnicity of Mother
Race	2014	2015	2016	2017	2018	2019	2020	2021	2022	2023	2024
White	86,227 (54.4%)	85,424 (54.0%)	82,318 (53.3%)	78,925 (52.8%)	77,244 (53.3%)	74,434 (53.1%)	70,550 (52.9%)	71,482 (54.1%)	68,107 (53.1%)	64,698 (51.8%)	64,630 (51.4%)
Black	28,160 (17.8%)	28,059 (17.7%)	25,619 (16.6%)	25,685 (17.2%)	24,482 (16.9%)	23,258 (16.6%)	22,293 (16.7%)	20,779 (15.7%)	19,296 (15.0%)	18,013 (14.4%)	17,272 (13.7%)
Asian	10,174 (6.4%)	10,222 (6.5%)	10,015 (6.5%)	9,650 (6.5%)	9,452 (6.5%)	9,169 (6.5%)	8,505 (6.4%)	8,338 (6.3%)	8,277 (6.4%)	8,416 (6.7%)	8,897 (7.1%)
American Indian	227 (0.1%)	205 (0.1%)	110 (0.0%)	133 (0.1%)	129 (0.1%)	119 (0.1%)	79 (>0.1%)	86 (>0.1%)	87 (>0.1%)	97 (>0.1%)	88 (>0.1%)
Hispanic (any race)	33,803 (21.3%)	33,902 (21.4%)	32,635 (21.1%)	31,428 (21.0%)	30,362 (21.0%)	30,097 (21.5%)	28,808 (21.6%)	28,546 (21.6%)	29,710 (23.1%)	30,465 (24.4%)	31,861 (25.3%)
Total	158,556 (100%)	158,116 (100%)	154,445 (100%)	149,390 (100%)	144,815 (100%)	140,128 (100%)	133,298 (100%)	132,189 (100%)	128,350 (100%)	124,820 (100%)	125,731 (100%)

- Since 2013, births of Hispanic origin are not collected by race, but included in one Hispanic group; persons of Hispanic origin may be of any race.

== Languages ==
The official language of Illinois is English, although between 1923 and 1969, state law gave official status to "the American language". Nearly 80% of people in Illinois speak English natively, and most of the rest speak it fluently as a second language. A number of dialects of American English are spoken, ranging from Inland Northern American English and African-American English around Chicago, to Midland American English in Central Illinois, to Southern American English in the far south.

Over 24% of Illinoians speak a language other than English at home, of which Spanish is by far the most widespread, at more than 14% of the total population. A sizeable number of Polish speakers is present in the Chicago Metropolitan Area. Illinois Country French has mostly gone extinct in Illinois, although it is still celebrated in the French Colonial Historic District.

Language spoken at home	% of total (2023)	Population (2023)
English only	75.7%	9,004,820
Spanish	14.1%	1,672,496
Polish	1.4%	161,590
Chinese	0.9%	109,270
Tagalog	0.7%	87,330
Arabic	0.6%	74,919
Urdu	0.5%	62,667
Ukrainian or other Slavic languages	0.5%	61,713
Gujarati	0.5%	53,564
Russian	0.4%	48,012
Hindi	0.4%	45,893
Korean	0.3%	36,666
French	0.3%	34,463
West African Languages	0.3%	32,917
German	0.3%	31,305
Serbo-Croatian	0.2%	26,399
Italian	0.2%	26,018
Greek	0.2%	23,751
Telugu	0.2%	23,163
Other Dravidian Languages	0.2%	20,193
Vietnamese	0.2%	19,468
All other languages	2.0%	232,046
Total population aged 5+	100%	11,888,663

== Religion ==
Religion in Illinois (2023)
1. Protestantism (36.0%)
2. No religion (29.0%)
3. Roman Catholicism (23.0%)
4. Islam (3.00%)
5. Other Christian (3.00%)
6. Judaism (2.00%)
7. Buddhism (1.00%)
8. Hinduism (1.00%)
9. Other religion (2.00%)
10. No response given/Unknown (0.00%)

=== Christianity ===
The religious demographics of Illinois closely mirror the religious demography of the nation as a whole. Christians of any denomination make up 62% of the population of Illinois, a share identical to the estimated national percentage of 62%, according to the Pew Research Center.

However, looking at specific denominations, Illinois has a significantly larger Catholic population than most states. Roman Catholics constitute the single largest religious denomination in Illinois; they are heavily concentrated in and around Chicago, reflecting the prominent Hispanic, Polish, Irish, and Italian diasporas in the area. As of 2023, Catholics account for nearly 25% of the state's population. In 2010, Catholics in Illinois numbered 3,648,907, while by 2020, this number had declined to 3,099,544. The first and only American-born Catholic pope, Pope Leo XIV, was born in Chicago and raised in the suburb of Dolton.

When taken together as a group, the various Protestant denominations comprise a greater percentage of the state's population than do Catholics, making up 36% of the state's population. The largest Protestant denominations in 2020 were the United Methodist Church with 235,045 members and the Southern Baptist Convention with 222,589. Illinois has one of the largest concentrations of Missouri Synod Lutherans in the United States, at 182,097.

Illinois played an important role in the early Latter Day Saint movement, with Nauvoo becoming a gathering place for Mormons in the early 1840s. Following the 1844 killing of Mormon leader Joseph Smith by a lynch mob in nearby Carthage, Nauvoo was the location of the succession crisis, which led to the separation of the Mormon movement into several Latter Day Saint sects. The Church of Jesus Christ of Latter-day Saints, the largest of the sects to emerge from the Mormon schism, has more than 55,000 adherents in Illinois today.

=== Other Abrahamic religious communities ===
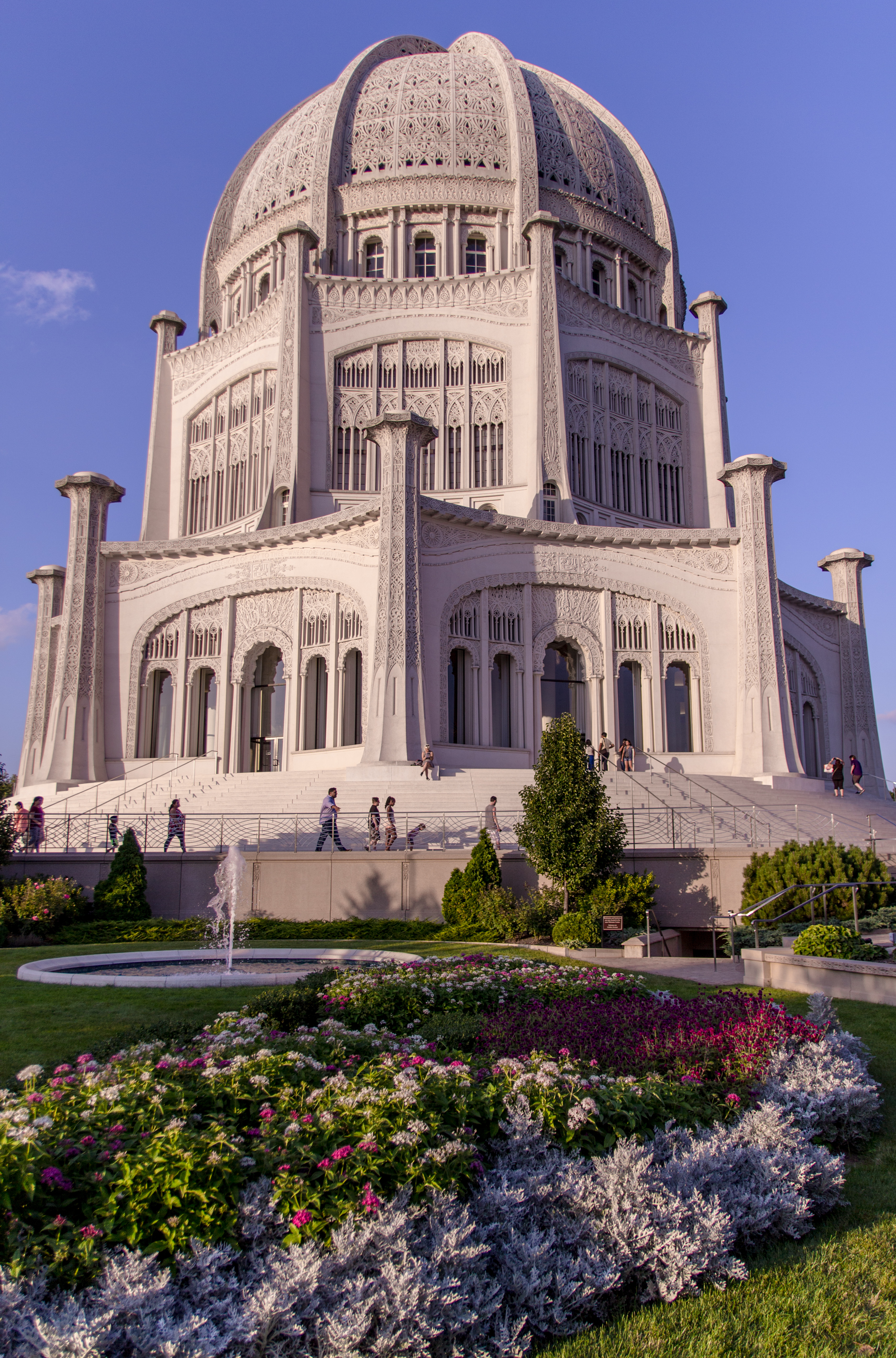
The Baháʼí House of Worship in Wilmette, Illinois

A significant number of adherents of other Abrahamic faiths can be found in Illinois. Largely concentrated in the Chicago metropolitan area, followers of the Muslim, Baháʼí, and Jewish religions all call the state home. Muslims constituted the largest non-Christian group, with 473,792 adherents. Illinois has the largest concentration of Muslims by state in the country, with 3.7% of the population being Muslim. The highest concentration of Muslims in the state is in suburban DuPage county, where they make up approximately 7.6% of the population. In the Chicago area as a whole, about 4.7% of the population are Muslim, the highest rate of any major metropolitan area in the United States.

The largest and oldest surviving Baháʼí House of Worship in the world is located on the shores of Lake Michigan in Wilmette, Illinois, one of eight continental Baháʼí House of Worship. It serves as a space for people of all backgrounds and religions to gather, meditate, reflect, and pray, expressing the Baháʼí principle of the oneness of religions.

The Chicago area has a very large Jewish community, particularly in the northern suburbs of Skokie, Buffalo Grove, Highland Park, and surrounding areas. Former Chicago Mayor Rahm Emanuel was the Windy City's first Jewish mayor. The current governor of Illinois, J.B. Pritzker, is Jewish, being the third person of Jewish descent to hold the office after Henry Horner and Samuel H. Shapiro. Almost 4% of the Chicago area's population is Jewish, numbering over 300,000 people.

=== Other religions ===
Chicago is also home to a significant population of Hindus, Sikhs, Jains, and Buddhists.
