= Pluralism =

Pluralism in general denotes a diversity of views or stands, rather than a single approach or method.

Pluralism or pluralist may refer more specifically to:

== Politics and law ==
- Pluralism (political philosophy), the acknowledgement of a diversity of political systems
- Pluralism (political theory), belief that there should be diverse and competing centres of power in society
- Legal pluralism, the existence of differing legal systems in a population or area
- Pluralist democracy, a political system with more than one center of power

== Philosophy ==
- Philosophical pluralism, a doctrine according to which many basic substances make up reality
- Pluralist school, a Greek school of pre-Socratic philosophers
- Epistemological pluralism or methodological pluralism, the view that some phenomena require multiple methods to account for their nature
- Value pluralism, the idea that several values may be equally correct and yet in conflict with each other

== Religion ==
- Religious pluralism, the acceptance of all religious paths as equally valid, promoting coexistence
- Clerical pluralism, the holding of multiple ecclesiastical offices
- Pluralism Project, a Harvard-affiliated project to investigate religious diversity in the United States

== Other uses ==
- Cosmic pluralism, the belief in numerous other worlds beyond the Earth, which may possess the conditions suitable for life
- Cultural pluralism, when small groups within a larger society maintain their unique cultural identities
- Media pluralism, the representation of different cultural groups and political opinions in the media
- Pluralist commonwealth, a systemic model of wealth democratization
- Pluralistic ignorance, a phenomenon in which people mistakenly believe that others predominantly hold an opinion different from their own
- Pluralism in economics, a campaign to enrich the academic discipline of economics

== See also ==
- Plurality (disambiguation)
- Journal of Legal Pluralism, a peer-reviewed academic journal that focuses on legal pluralism
- Global Centre for Pluralism, an international centre for research of pluralist societies
- Multiculturalism, the existence of multiple cultural traditions within a single country
- Postmodernism, a broad movement in the late-20th century that is skeptical toward grand narratives or ideologies
- Pluralistic, a blog by Cory Doctorow
