= Plurality =

Plurality may refer to:

== Law and politics ==
- Plurality decision, in a decision by a multi-member court, an opinion held by more judges than any other but not by an overall majority
- Plurality (voting), when a candidate or proposition wins by polling more votes than any other but does not receive more than half of all votes cast
- Plurality voting, a system in which each voter votes for one candidate and the candidate with a plurality is elected

== Philosophy and religion ==
- Plurality (church governance), a type of Christian church polity in which decisions are made by a committee
- Plurality of benefices, the holding of two different benefices simultaneously
- Plurality of gods, an understanding of God in Mormonism
- Plurality, one of the "twelve pure concepts of the understanding" proposed by Kant in his Critique of Pure Reason
- Ontological pluralism

== Other uses ==
- Plurality (company), an Israeli semiconductor company
- Plurality (film), a 2021 Taiwanese psychological thriller film
- Grammatical number, which is sometimes referred to as plurality
- Plural identity, a collective identity of people identifying as having or using multiple personalities, or as having multiple people occupying one mind and body

== See also ==
- Multiplicity (disambiguation)
- Plurality of worlds (disambiguation)
- Pluralism (disambiguation)
- Plural
