= Majority minority in the United States =

Places with less than 50% non-Hispanic white population

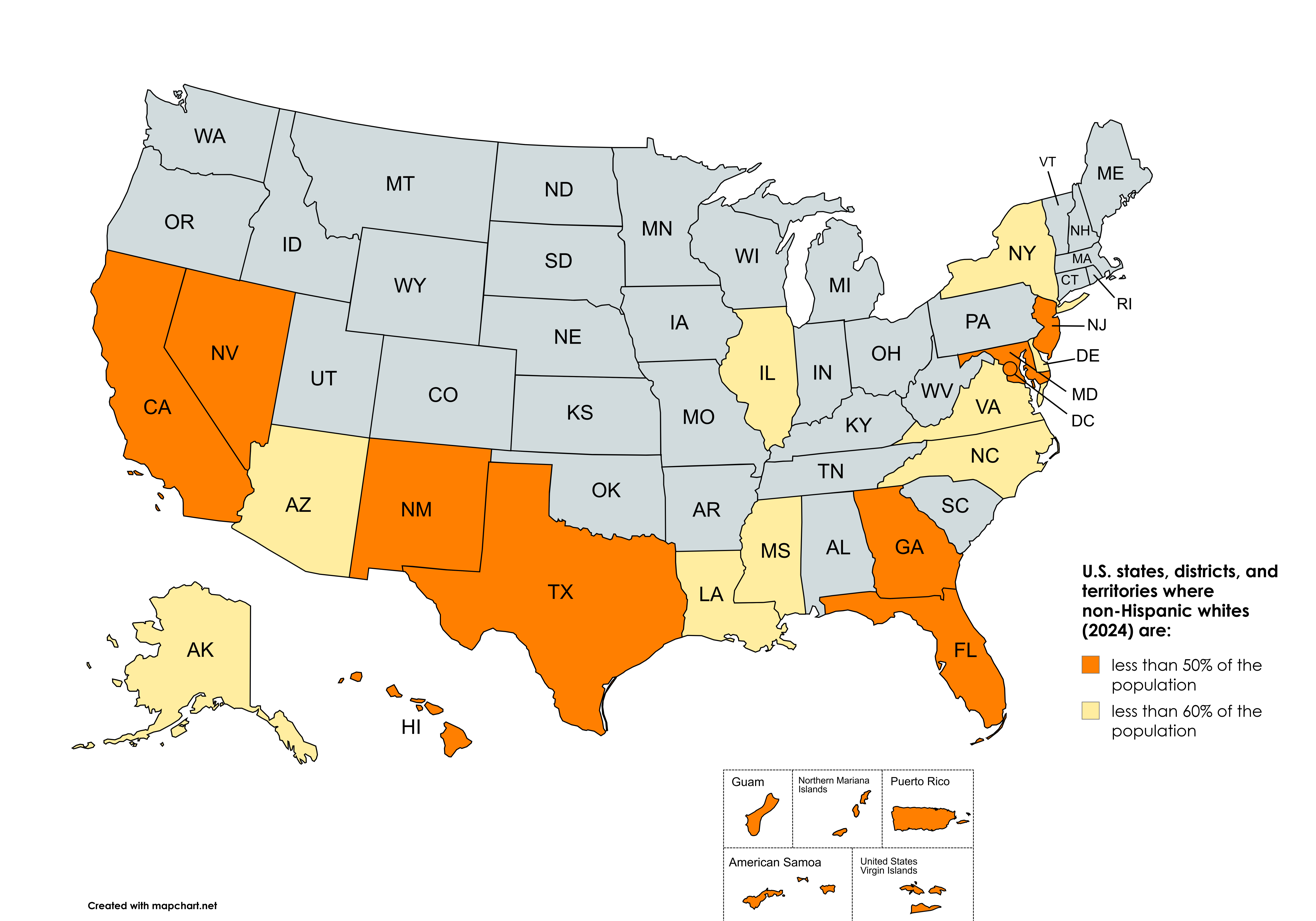
US states, districts, and territories in 2024 in which non-Hispanic whites are less than 50% of the population.

In the United States of America, majority-minority area or minority-majority area is a term describing a U.S. state or jurisdiction whose population is composed of less than 50% non-Hispanic whites. It is defined as a population with a collective majority of nationwide minorities, meaning a grouping of racial and ethnic groups (other than the national majority) that composes over 50% of the territorial population, regardless if one of those minority groups already attains a majority on its own. No single minority is yet the majority in any state, with the closest to that end being Hispanics in New Mexico (47.74% of the total population as of the 2020 census). As such, all majority-minority states do not have a single ethnic or racial group as the outright majority.

Racial data is derived from self-identification questions on the U.S. census and on U.S. Census Bureau estimates. (See race and ethnicity in the United States census). The term is often used in voting rights law to designate voting districts that are designed under the Voting Rights Act to enable ethnic or language minorities "the opportunity to elect their candidate of choice." In that context, the term was first used by the Supreme Court in 1977. The Court had previously used the term in employment discrimination and labor relations cases.

- As of 2024, nine states are majority-minority: Hawaii (20.7%) (which has never had a non-Hispanic White majority), California (32.6%), New Mexico (35.1%), Texas (37.8%), Nevada (42.8%), Maryland (45.3%), Georgia (48.0%), Florida (49.1%), and New Jersey (49.5%).
- Washington, D.C. (36.2%), together with all of the populated United States territories—Puerto Rico, Guam, the U.S. Virgin Islands, the Northern Mariana Islands, and American Samoa—are majority-minority. None of the current U.S. territories has ever had a non-Hispanic White majority.
- In 2011, minority births (children under age 1) represented 50.1% of the total, becoming a majority for the first time in American history. This figure has fluctuated since then, with non-Hispanic White births temporarily regaining majority, and then falling again below 50%; as of 2024, 49.6% of births were to non-Hispanic White mothers, 27.4% were to Hispanic mothers (the fastest growing demographic), 13.2% to non-Hispanic Black and African American mothers, and 6.3% to non-Hispanic Asian mothers.
- Out of all Americans including Puerto Rico, the US is currently 44.25% Minority American per 2024 ACS Data.
- As of 2017, minority children comprise the majority among children in fourteen states: the six that are already majority-minority, plus the following eight: Arizona, Florida, Georgia, New Jersey, Delaware, Alaska, New York, and Mississippi.
- As of 2024, children of non-Hispanic White origin constitute less than half—48%—of the nation’s child population.
- Per the 2020 United States Census, the percentage of non-Hispanic white residents is below 60% in eighteen states: the eight that are already majority-minority, plus the following ten: Florida (51.5%), New Jersey (51.9%), New York (52.5%), Arizona (53.4%), Mississippi (55.4%), Louisiana (55.8%), Alaska (57.5%), Illinois (58.3%), Delaware (58.6%), and Virginia (58.6%). Per the 2022 American Community Survey, the non-Hispanic white population declined below 50% in Georgia (49.63%); and per the 2023 American Community Survey, the non-Hispanic white population declined below 60% in North Carolina (59.75%). Per the 2024 American Community Survey one-year estimates, Florida at 49.07% and New Jersey at 49.50%, have both become majority minority States.
- The whole United States of America is projected to become majority-minority by the middle of the 21st century if current trends continue. The U.S. will then become the first major post-industrial society in the world where the dominant group established in an earlier period transitioned from majority to minority under the influence of changing demographics. With alternate immigration scenarios, the whole United States is projected to become majority-minority sometime between 2041 and 2046 (depending on the amount of net immigration into the U.S., birth/death rates, and intermarriage rates over the preceding years).

== States ==
=== Southern States ===
From colonial times to the early-twentieth century, much of the Deep South had a black majority. Three Southern states had populations that were majority-Black: Louisiana (from 1810 until about 1890), South Carolina (until the 1920s), and Mississippi (from the 1830s to the 1930s).

In the same period, Georgia, Alabama, and Florida had populations that were nearly 50% Black; while Maryland, North Carolina, and Virginia had black populations approaching or exceeding 40%. Texas's Black population reached 30%.

The demographics of these states changed markedly from the 1890s through the 1960s, as two waves of the Great Migration resulted in more than 6,500,000 African Americans to abandon the economically depressed, segregated Deep South in search of better employment opportunities and living conditions, first in Northern and Midwestern industrial cities, and later west to California. One-fifth of Florida's Black population had left the state by 1940, for instance. During the last thirty years of the twentieth century into the twenty-first century, scholars have documented a reverse New Great Migration of black people to southern states, but typically to urban destinations in the New South.

=== Washington, D.C. ===
Washington, D.C., was one of the magnets for black people during the Great Migration, and reached a majority-Black status during the migration's latter stages. The Black proportion has declined since the 1990s due to gentrification and expanding opportunities elsewhere, with some leaving the district because of rising housing costs or for opportunities in the South. Many Black people have moved to Maryland, Georgia, Florida, and Texas. They are joined by others migrating to jobs in states of the New South in a reverse of the Great Migration. Per the 2020 Census, the Black population represented 40.9% of the D.C. population — a considerable decline from 75% in the late-1970s. At the same time, the Asian, Hispanic, and Mixed race populations have all increased in the District, and it is still classified as a majority-minority area.

=== Hawaii ===
Hawaii is the only state to have never had a non-Hispanic white majority, since the historic majority population consisted of Native Hawaiians (Polynesians). However, according to the 2020 United States Census, the largest racial groups were Asians (36.5%), non-Hispanic Whites (21.6%), and individuals identifying as two or more races (20.0%), each exceeding the share of Native Hawaiians, who accounted for 10.2% of the population (see list of U.S. states and territories by race/ethnicity).

=== New Mexico ===
New Mexico is a majority-minority state where the Hispanic population represents 47.74% of the total population (as of the 2020 census). As early as 1940, roughly half the population was estimated to be nonwhite. Before becoming a state in 1912, New Mexico was among the few U.S. territories that were predominantly nonwhite, which contributed to its delayed admission into the Union.

The Hispanic population of New Mexico represents a plurality and includes Hispanos descended from pre-United States settlers and more recent successions of Mexican Americans.

=== Immigration ===
Since 1965, changes in the origin of foreign immigration have resulted in increases in the number of majority-minority areas, most notably in California. Its legal resident population was 89.5% 'non-Hispanic white' in the 1940s, but by 2020, was 34.7% 'non-Hispanic white'.

== Increase in Hispanic population ==
The Hispanic and Latino American population of the US has increased exponentially in the 21st century, having almost doubled between 2000 and 2024, and accounting for more than half of all U.S. population growth during that period. According to annual estimates from the U.S. Census Bureau, as of July 1, 2024, the Hispanic population was estimated at 68,086,153, representing approximately 20% of the total U.S. population, making them the second-largest group in the country after the non-Hispanic White population.

The increase in the Hispanic population is both due to higher birth rates, with the share of births to Hispanic mothers increasing, while the share of births to non-Hispanic White and non-Hispanic Black mothers has decreased, and also due to immigration, with persons from the Americas having received 43% of the total Green cards issued by the United States in 2023-2024.

Mexican Americans are the largest Hispanic group in the US. In 2024, Mexican Americans made up 11.56% of the US population and 57.32% of all Hispanic Americans, with a number of 38,990,058 people.

== Cities ==
Many cities in the United States became majority-minority by 2010. Out of the top 20 cities by population in 2020, only Indianapolis (50.08%), Columbus (51.97%), Denver (54.33%), and Seattle (59.45%) retain non-Hispanic white majorities.

As of 2012, 50 metropolitan areas in the U.S. are majority-minority.

As of 2015, 12% of U.S. counties are majority-minority.

== Data collection ==
The first data for New Mexico was a 5% sample in 1940, which estimated non-Hispanic whites at 50.9%. Hispanics are not classified as a race, according to the U.S. census, but as an ethnic and cultural group of any race. Of respondents who listed Hispanic origin, some identified as being of the White race, roughly half gave responses tabulated under "Some other race" (e.g. giving a national origin such as "Mexican" or a designation such as "Mestizo" as race), and much smaller numbers listed Black, American Indian, or Asian as their race.

In U.S. censuses since 1990, self-identification by respondents has been the primary way to identify race of residents. Presumption of race based on countries or regions given in the ancestry question is used only when a respondent has answered the ancestry question but not the race question. The U.S. census defines "White people" very broadly as "people having origins in any of the original peoples of Europe, the Middle East, or North Africa, i.e. Caucasoid. This definition has changed through the years.

Although the census attempts to enumerate both citizens and non-citizens, the undocumented immigrant population of the United States has proven hard to quantify; the census uses a 12 million base estimate nationally.

== Maps and graphs ==
Race/ethnicity by location per 2020 census data White populations are marked in italics. Largest non-white groups are marked in bold.
Area	White (all)	Non-Hispanic White	African American	Native American	Asian American	Pacific Islander American	Some other race	Two or more races	Hispanic or Latino American
California	41.2%	34.7%	5.4%	0.4%	15.1%	0.3%	0.6%	4.1%	**39.4%**
District of Columbia	39.6%	38.0%	**40.9%**	0.2%	4.8%	0.1%	0.5%	4.3%	11.3%
Hawaii	22.9%	21.6%	1.5%	0.2%	**36.5%**	10.2%	0.4%	20.1%	9.5%
Maryland	48.7%	47.2%	**29.1%**	0.2%	6.8%	0.04%	0.6%	4.4%	11.8%
New Mexico	51.0%	36.5%	1.8%	8.9%	1.7%	0.1%	0.5%	2.8%	**47.7%**
Texas	50.1%	39.7%	11.8%	0.3%	5.4%	0.1%	0.4%	3.0%	**39.3%**
United States	61.6%	57.8%	12.1%	0.7%	5.9%	0.2%	0.5%	4.1%	18.7%

=== Majority-minority counties in the United States by state (2020 Census) ===
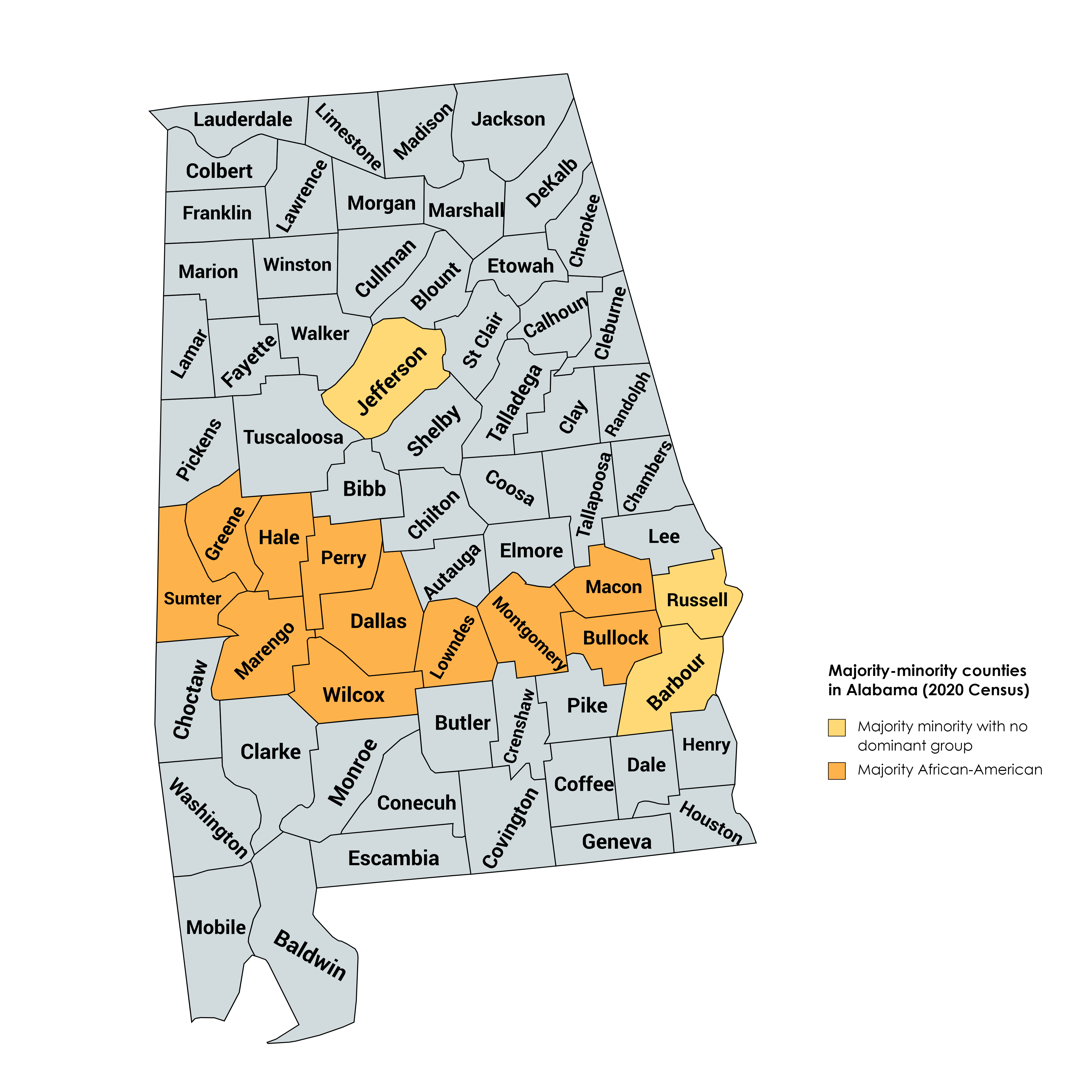
Alabama

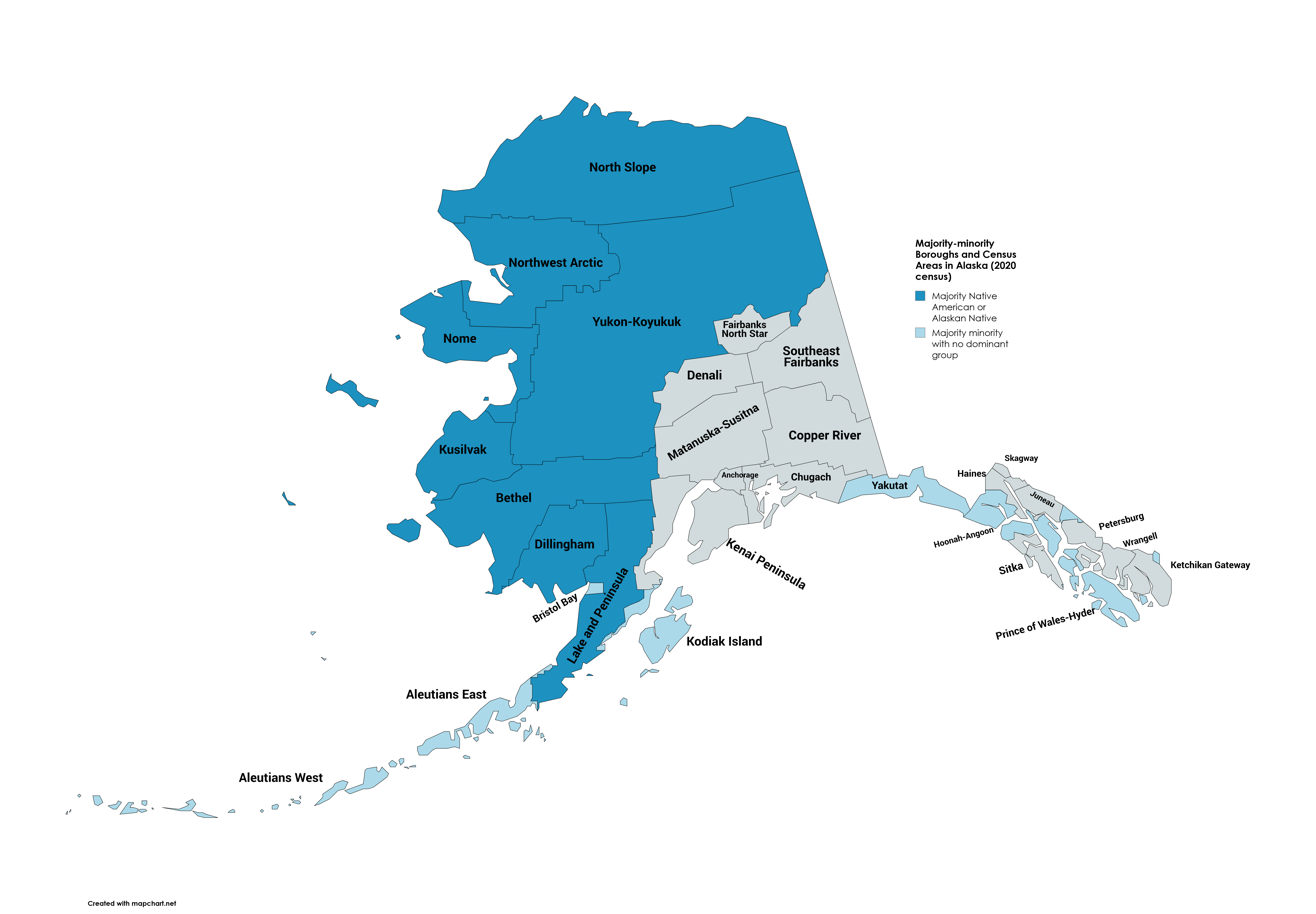
Alaska

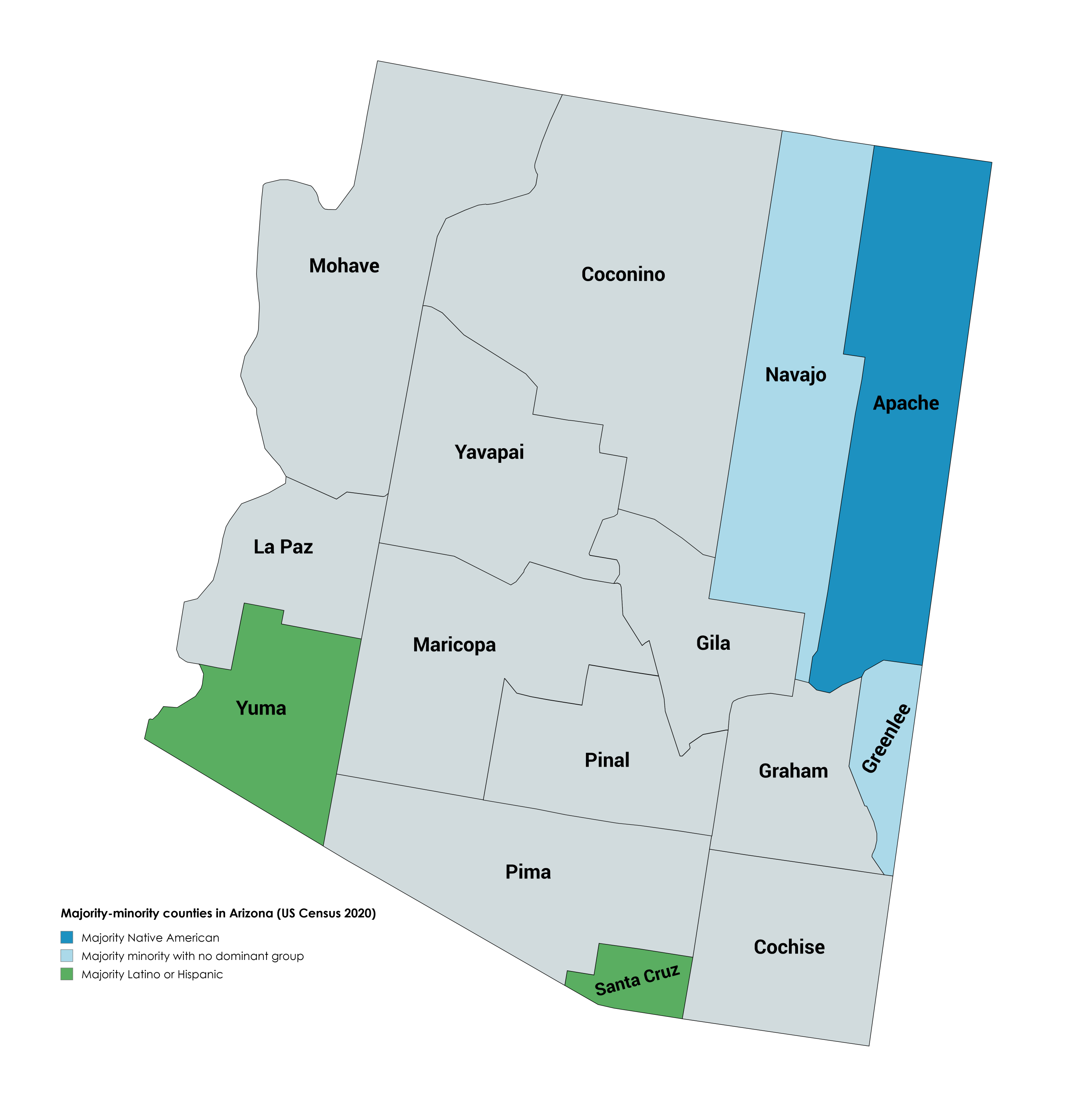
Arizona

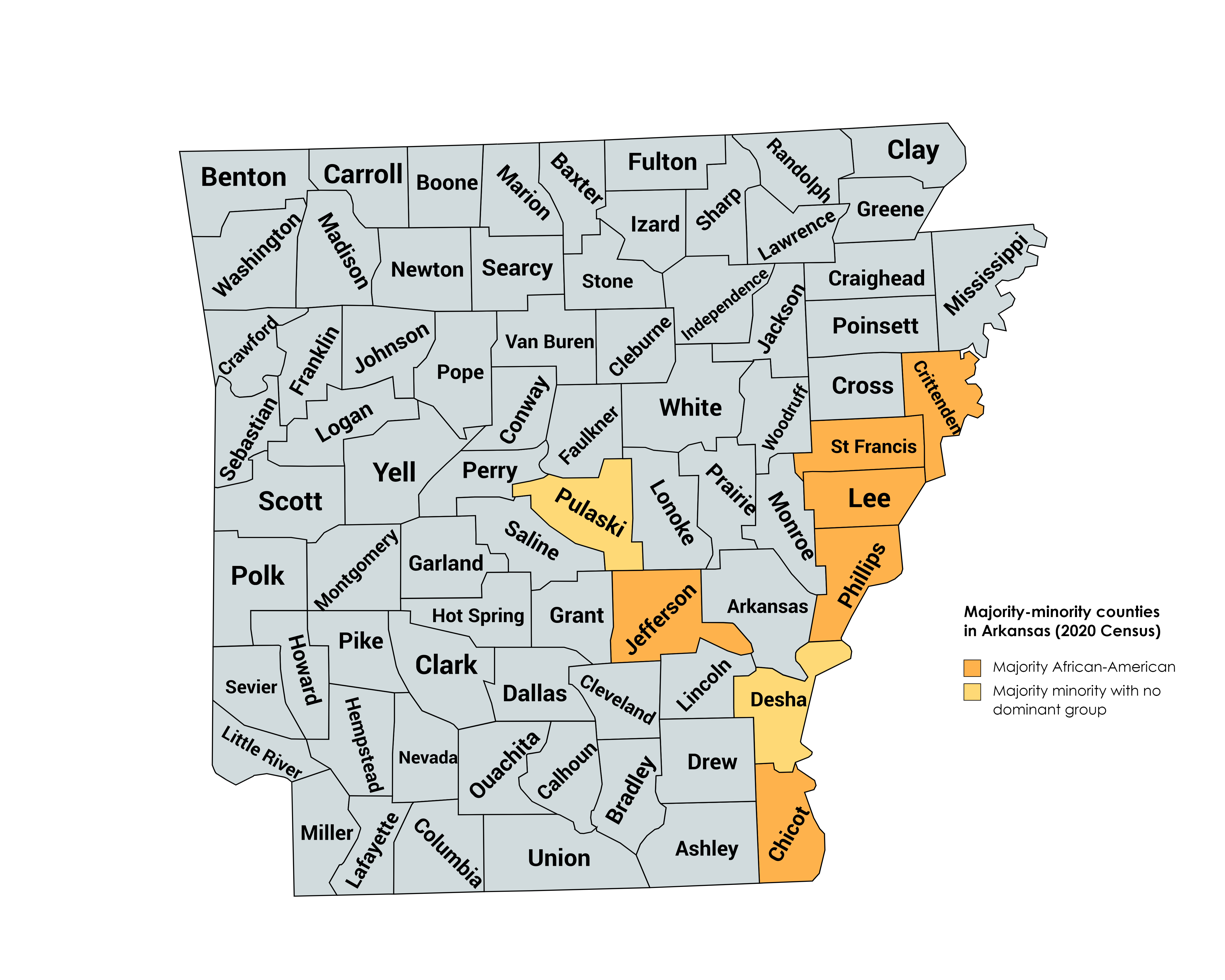
Arkansas

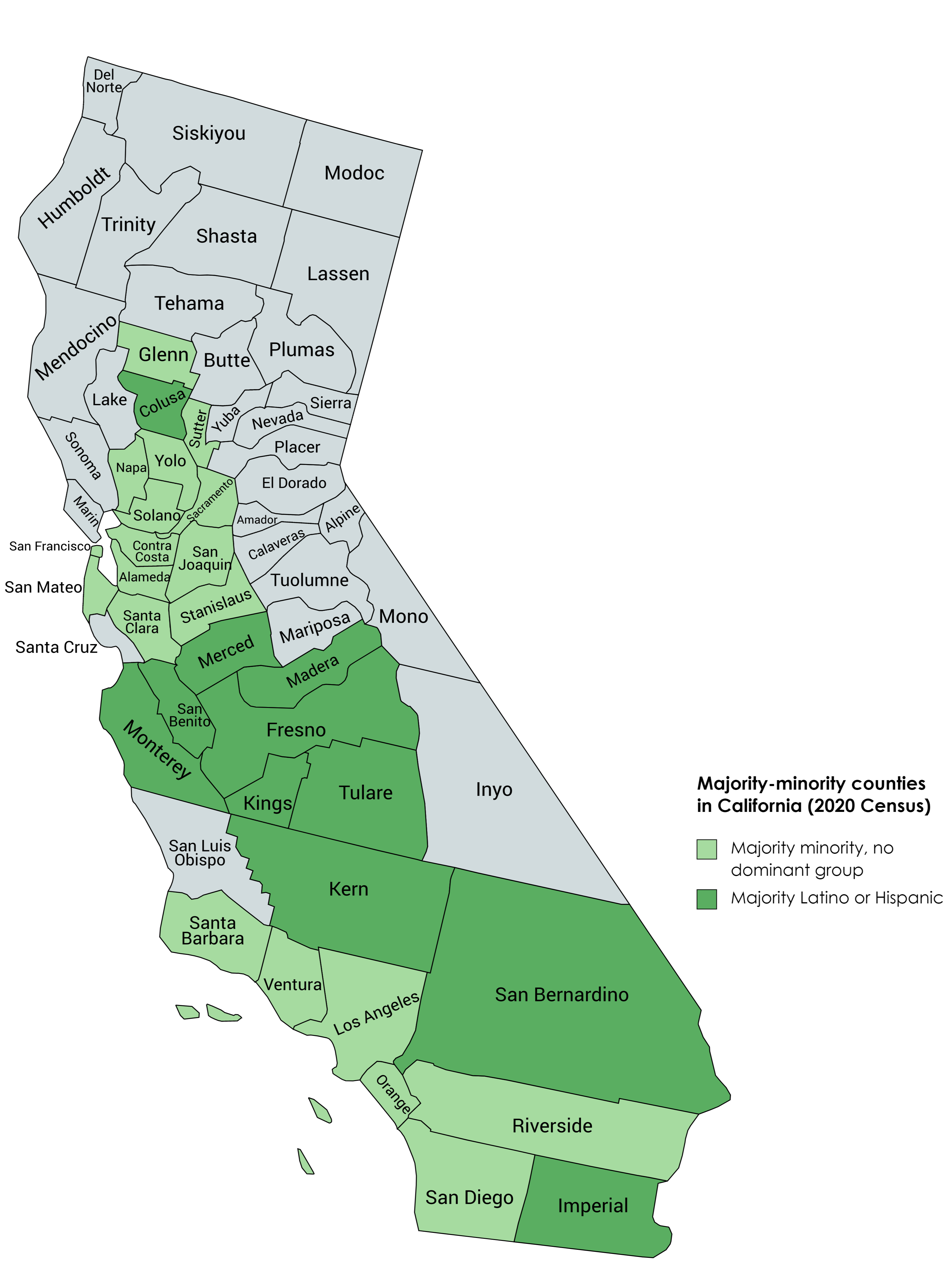
California

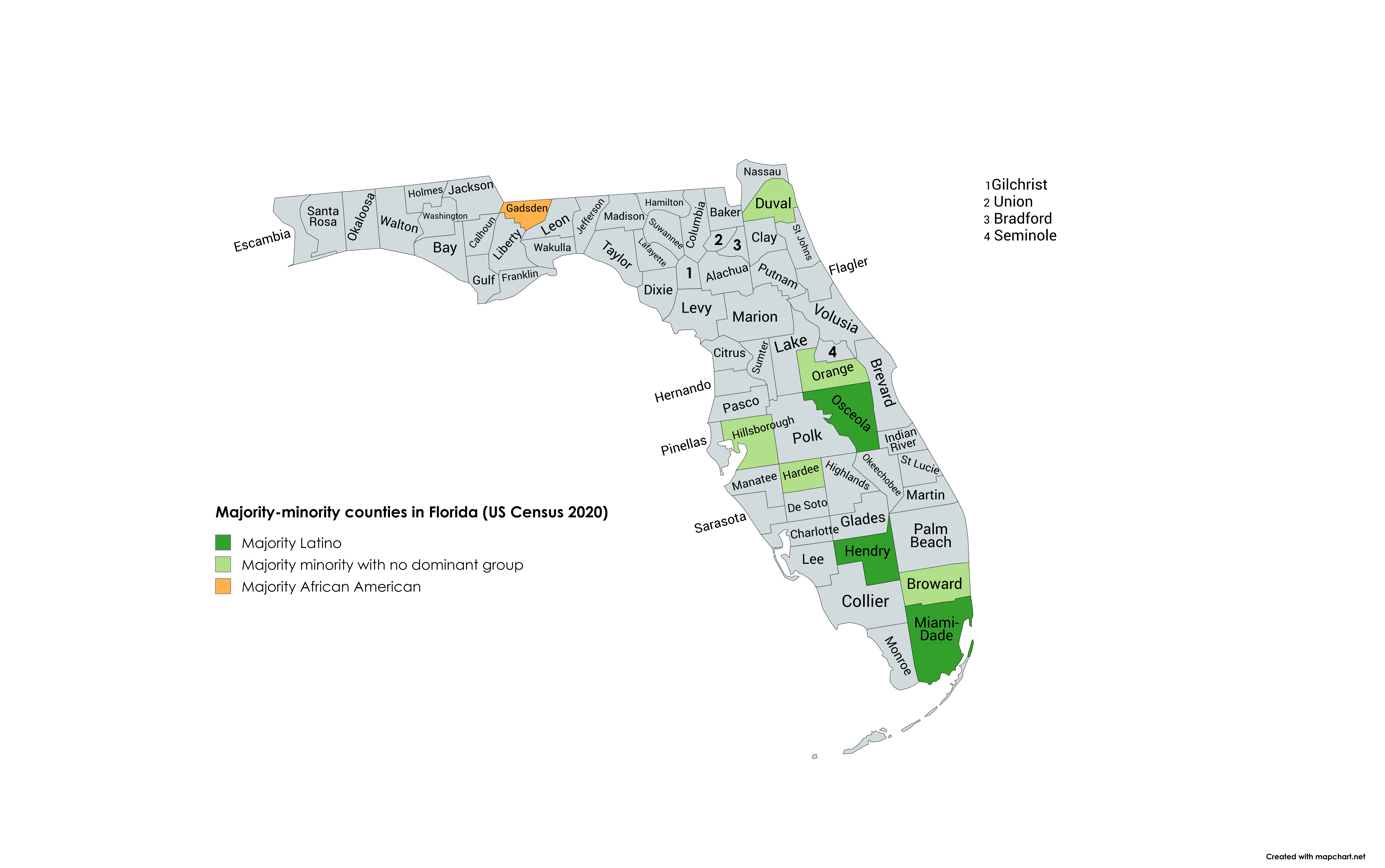
Florida

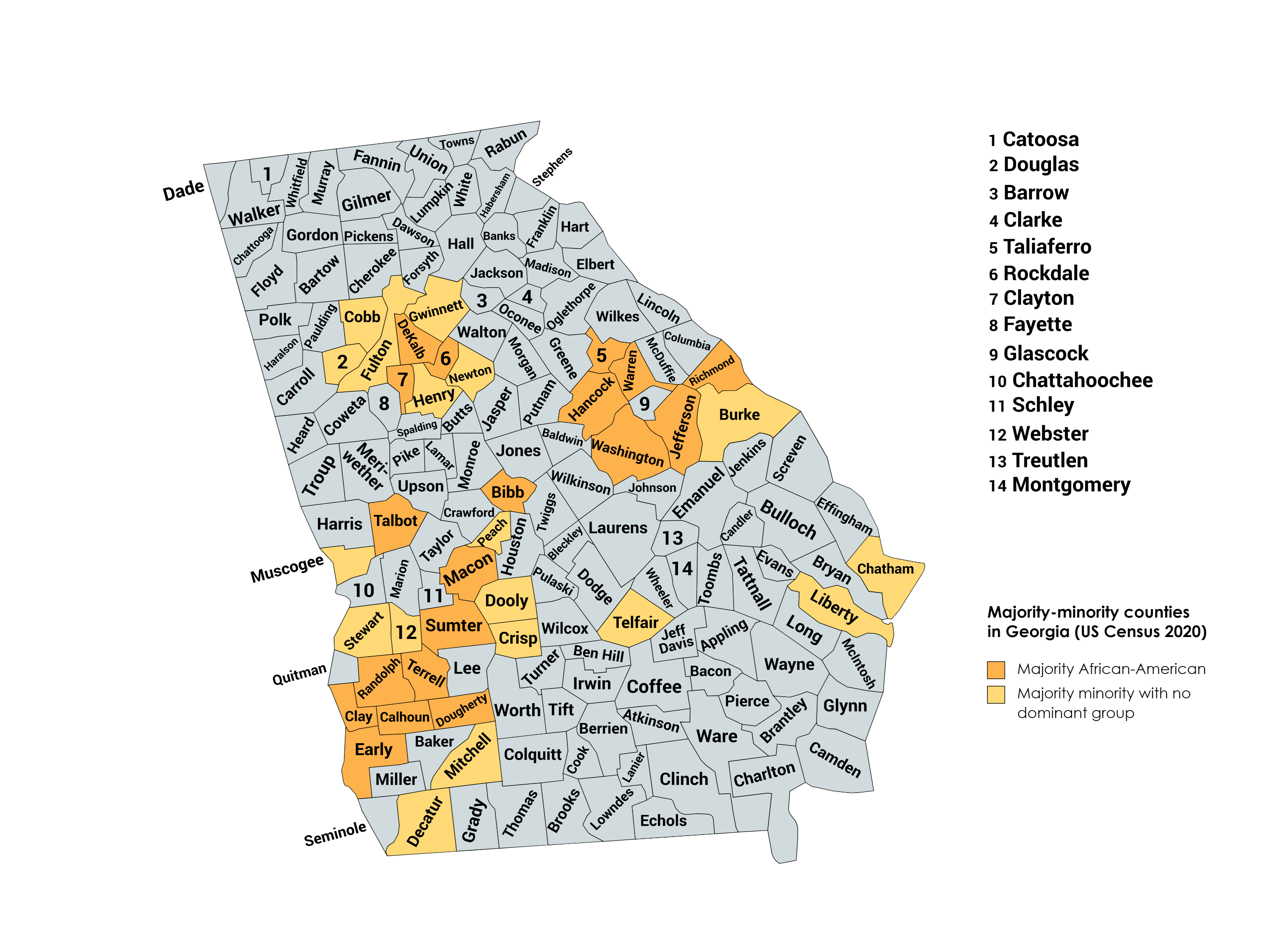
Georgia

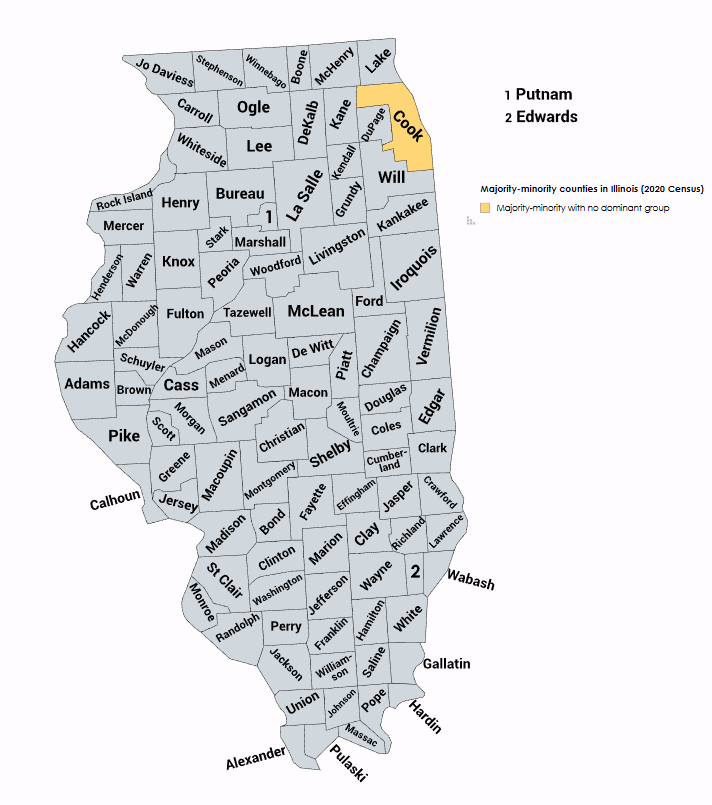
Illinois

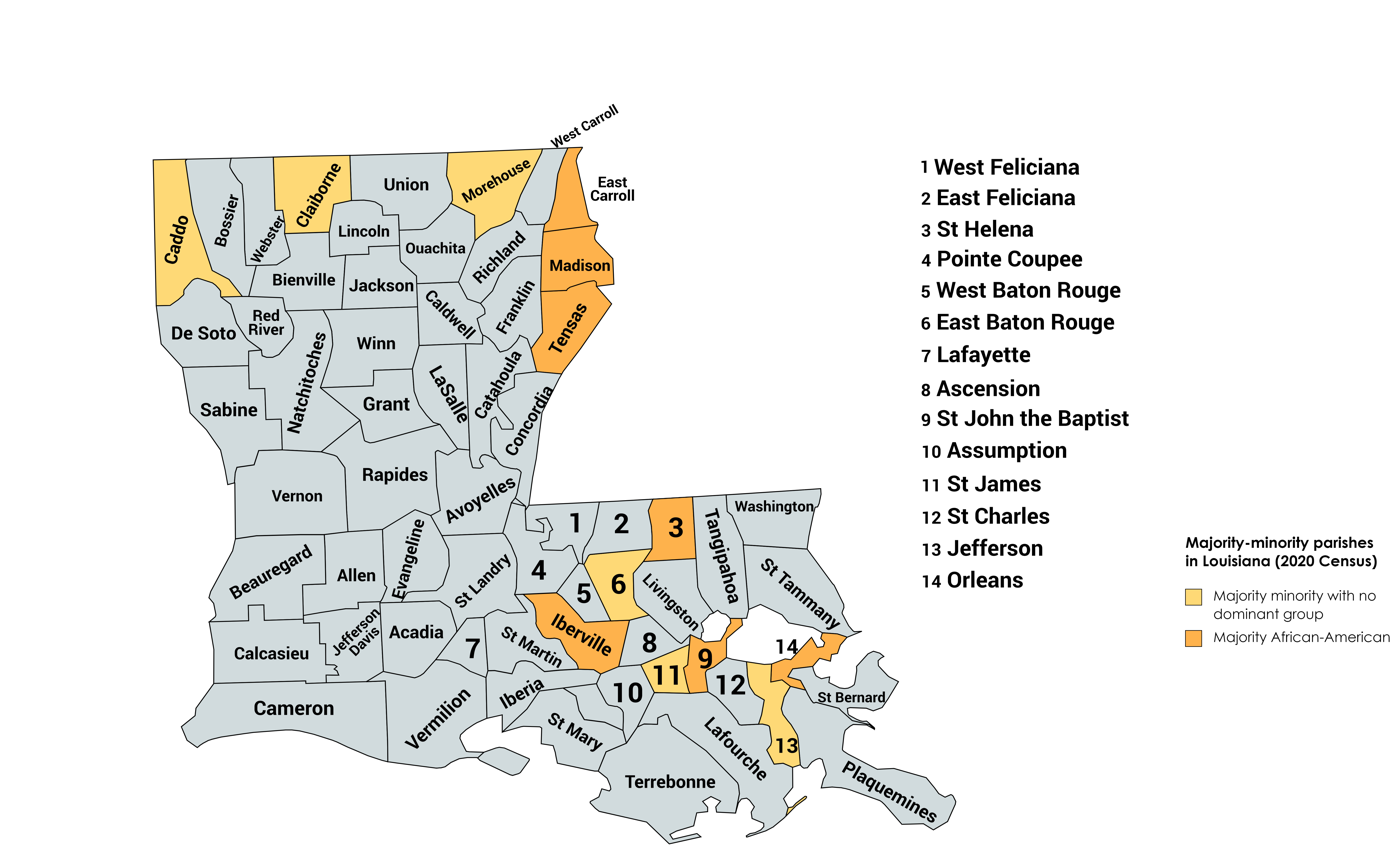
Louisiana

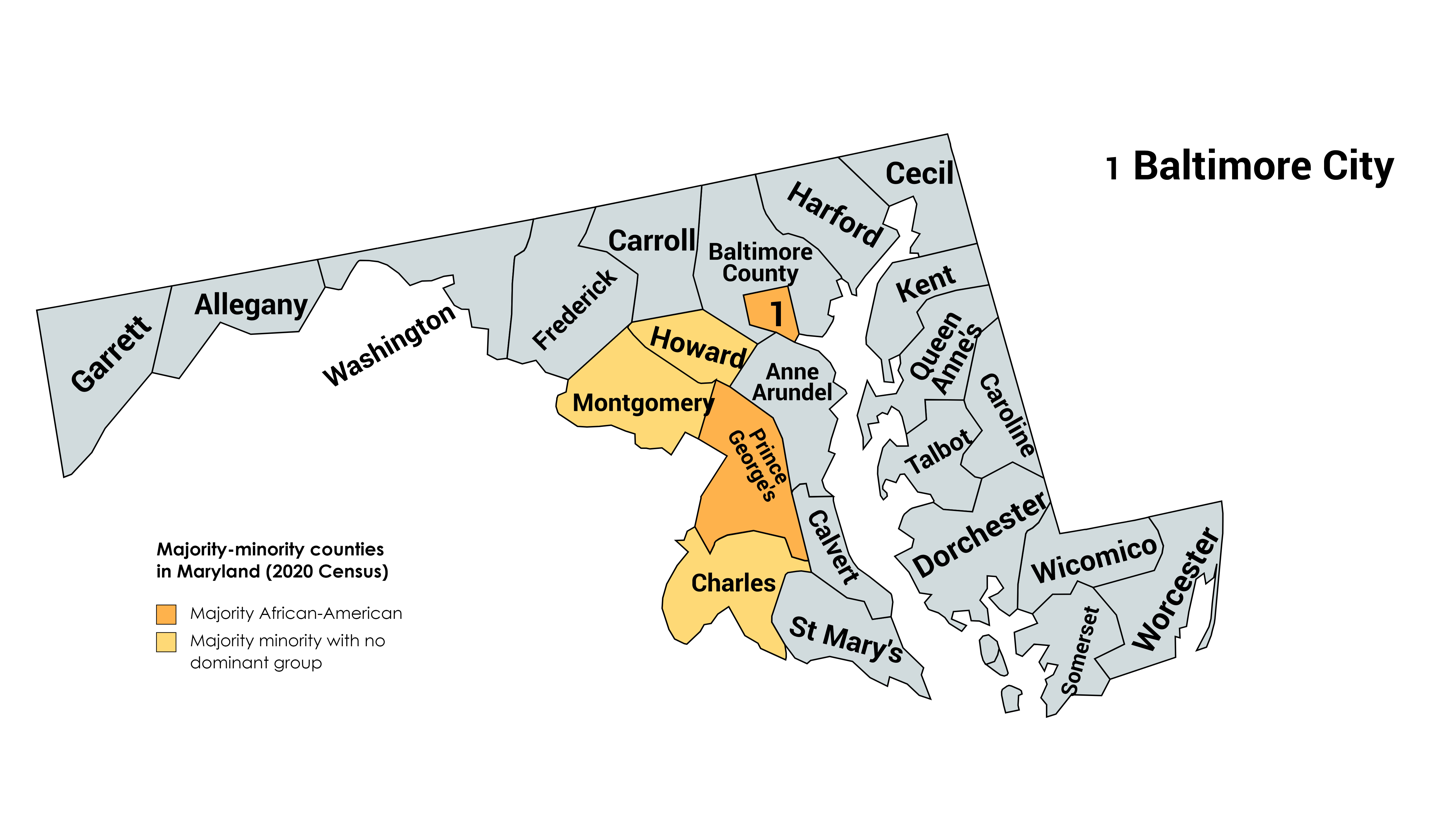
Maryland

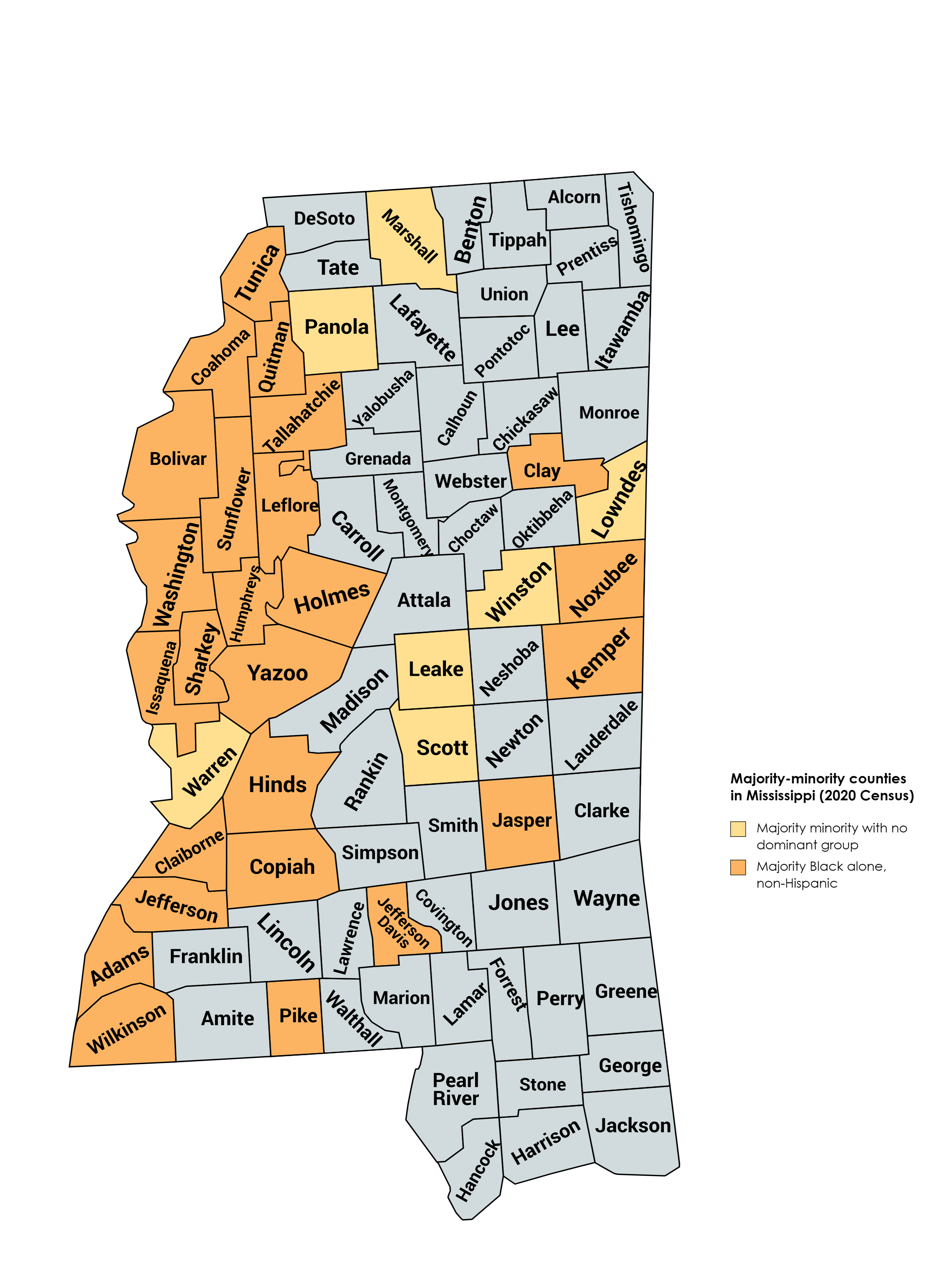
Mississippi

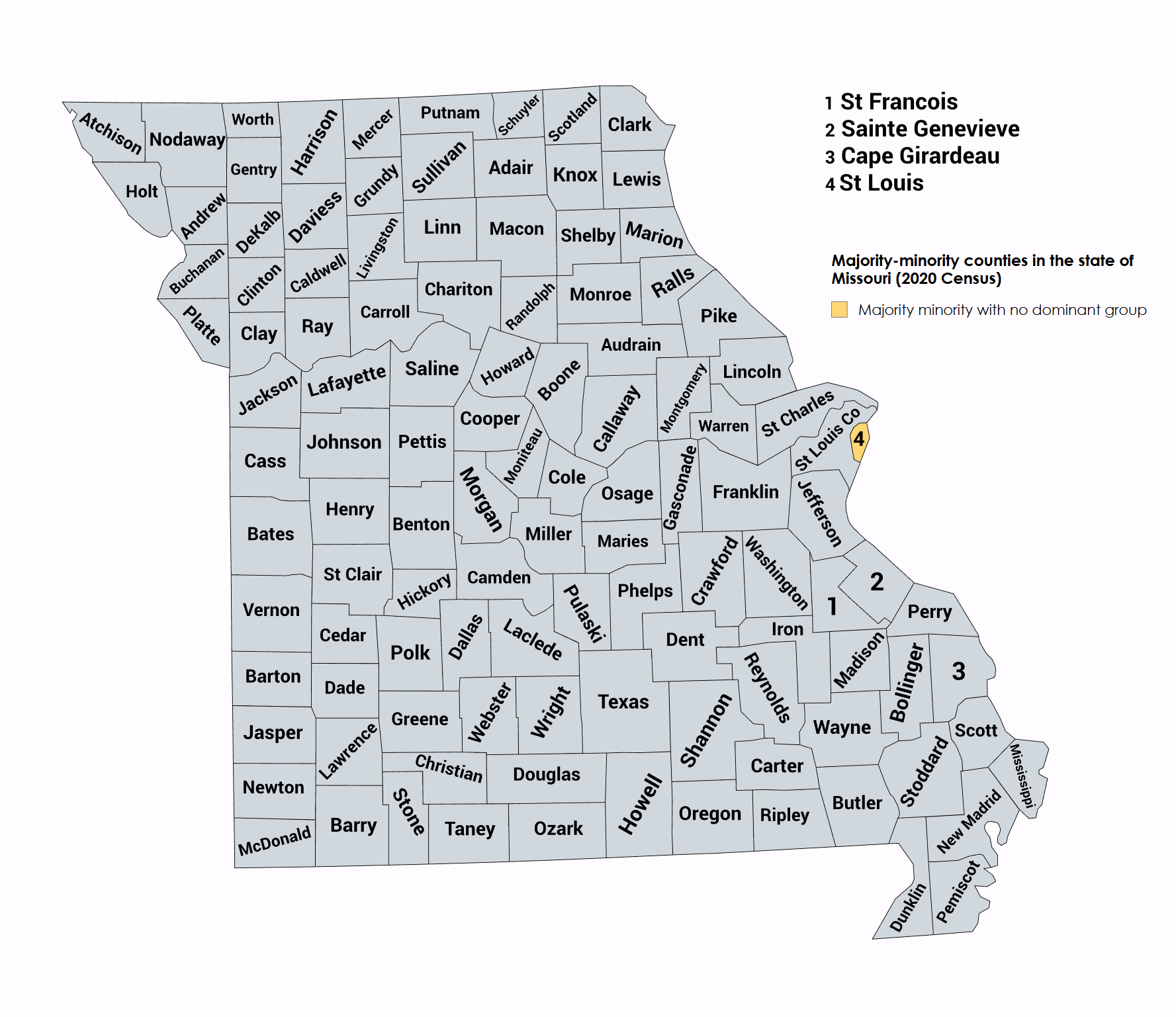
Missouri

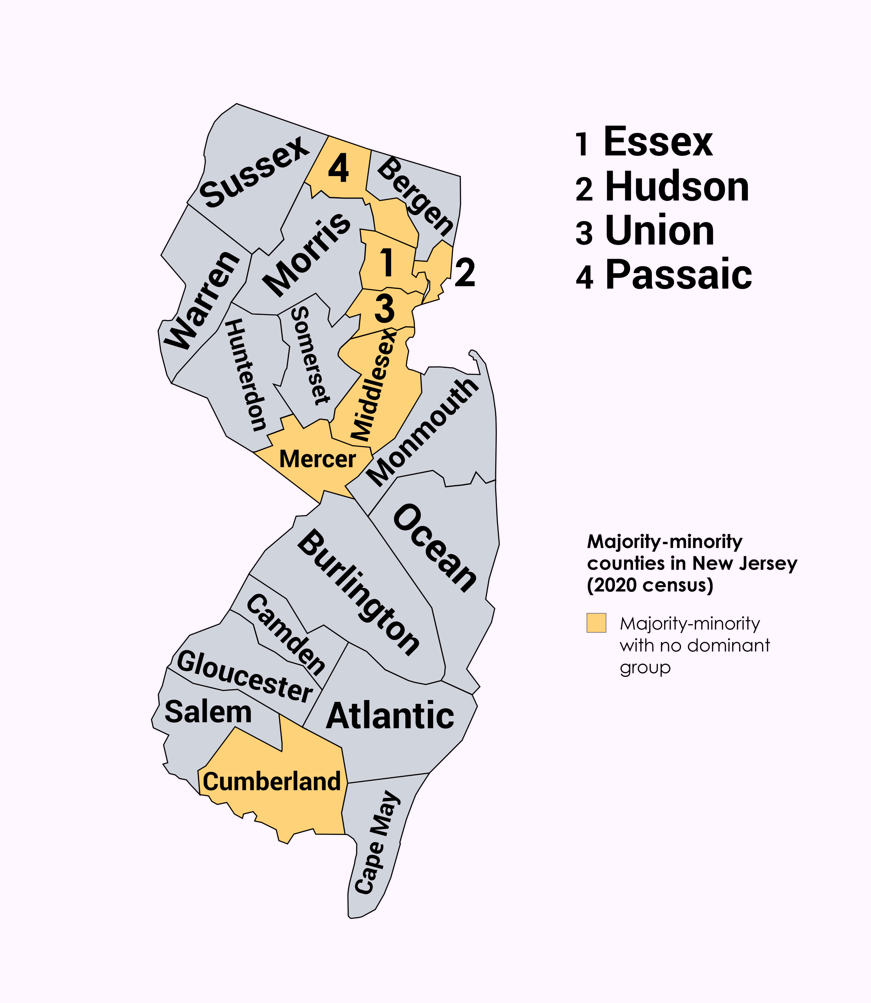
New Jersey

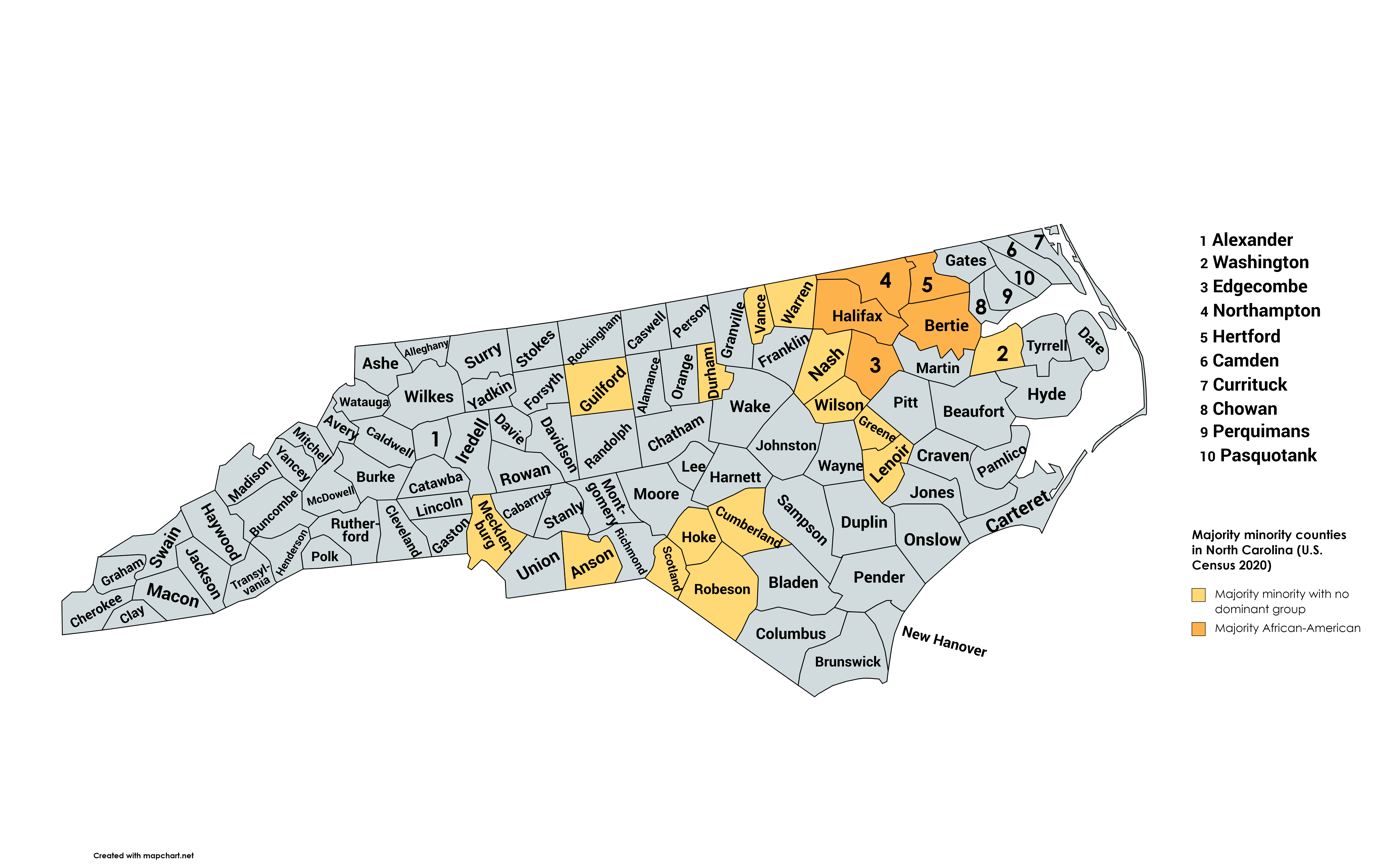
North Carolina

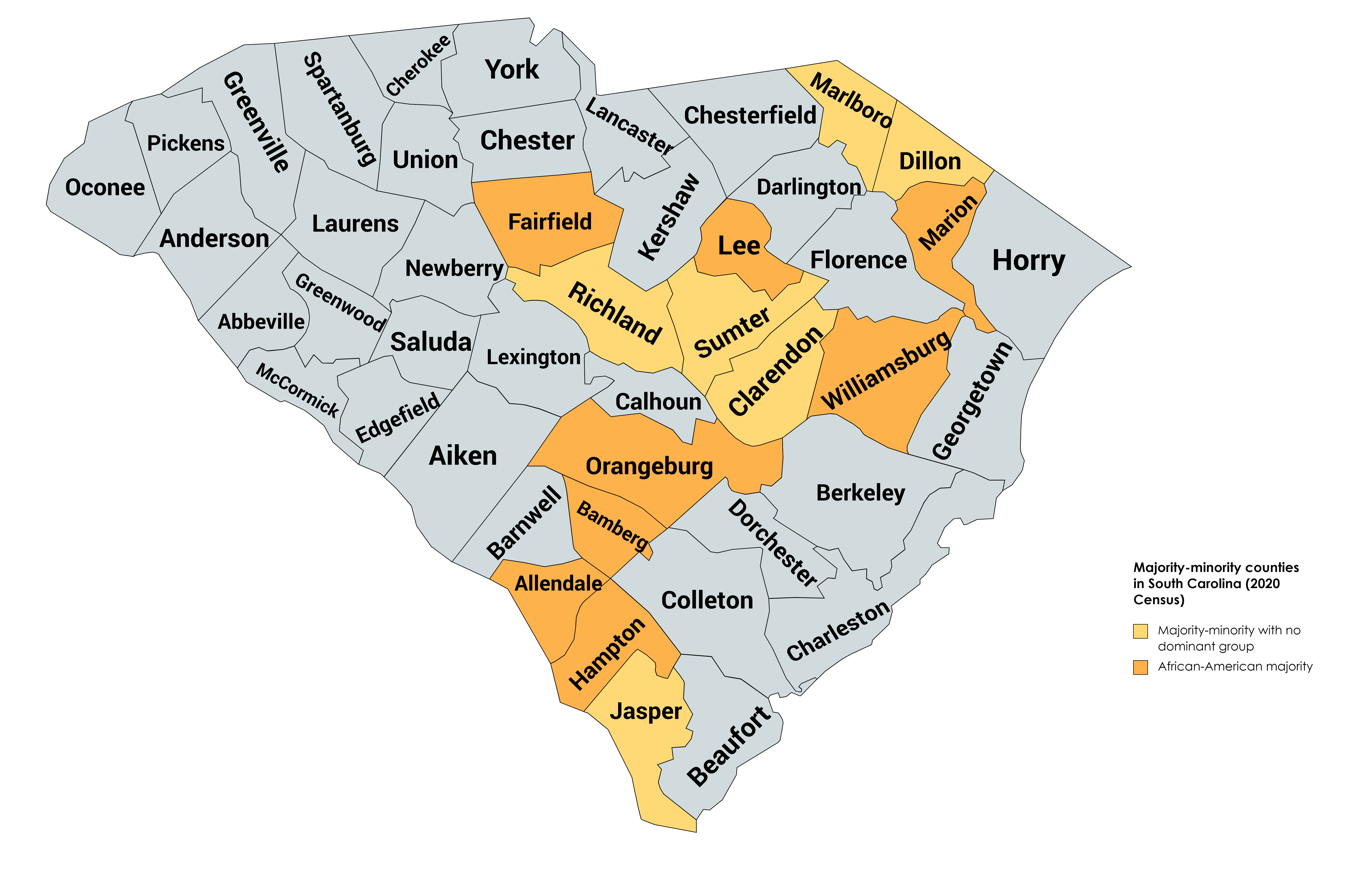
South Carolina

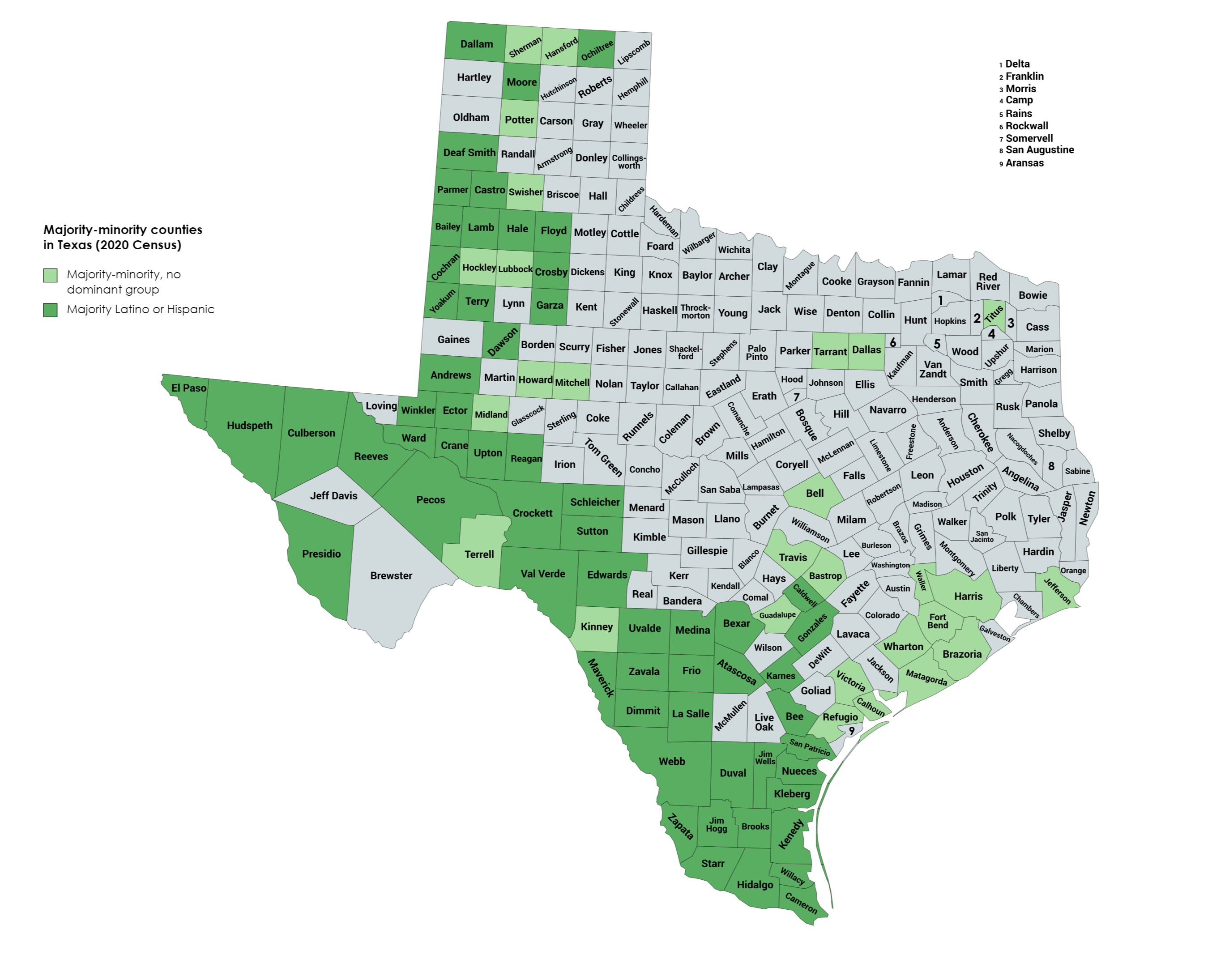
Texas

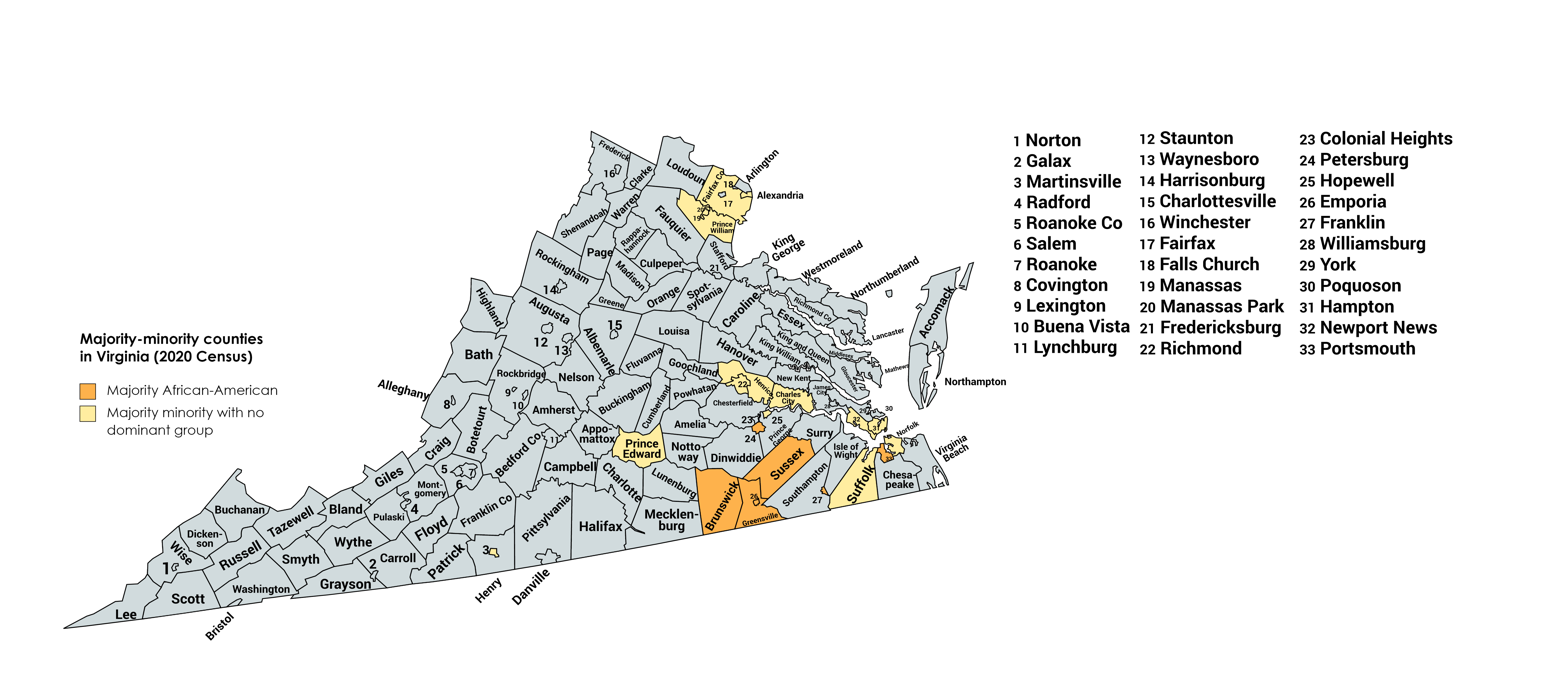
Virginia

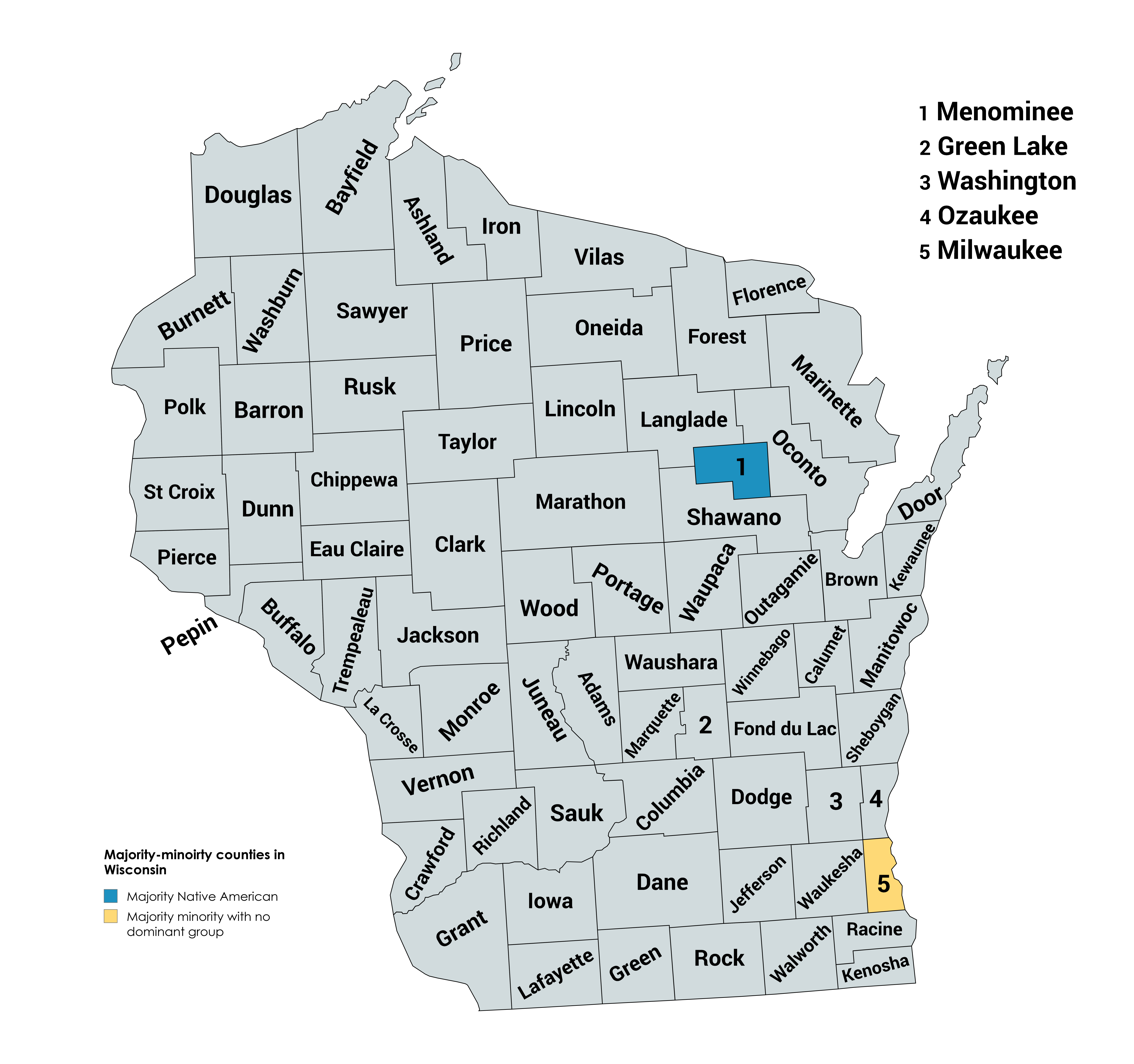
Wisconsin

== Institutions ==
In the United States for the 2018/2019 school year, 78.7% of white public school students attended schools where they are the majority, compared to 55.9% of Hispanics, 42.0% of African Americans, and 14.3% of Asians. At a national level in the US with regards to racial classification, public schools obtained majority minority status in 2014.

== Other uses ==
Normally, a state is classified as majority-minority because of the ethnic or racial makeup of residents, but other criteria are occasionally used, such as religion, disability, or age. For example, the majority of Utah residents are members of the Church of Jesus Christ of Latter-day Saints, a Christian denomination that is a religious minority throughout the rest of the United States. In addition to Mormon-dominant Utah, Roman Catholic majority Rhode Island and Louisiana are the only states in the U.S. where a single denomination constitutes a majority of the population. (By contrast, numerous denominations are classified as Protestant.) But, no U.S. state has a majority composed of any non-Christian group, except for Hawaii, where 51.1% of the population follow religions that would be non-mainstream in the rest of the United States. Hawaii is classified as religious majority of Unaffiliated, including agnostics, atheists, humanists, the irreligious, and secularists (non-practicing).

== Criticism ==
In January 2016, CUNY sociologist Richard Alba wrote an article in The American Prospect arguing that the way in which majority-minority calculations are made by the Census is misleading. Anyone identifying as of Hispanic, Asian, or Black ancestry is classified as non-white, although they may also have white ancestry. Alba argues that the incomes, marriage patterns, and social identities of people of who are mixed Hispanic-white and Asian-white descent are closer to those of non-Hispanic white people than monoracial Hispanics or Asians. Thus, when the Census projects that non-Hispanic whites will be less than 50% of the population by the 2040s, Alba believes these people of mixed-race ancestry are improperly excluded from that category.

== See also ==
- List of majority minority United States congressional districts
- Lists of U.S. cities with non-white majority populations
- List of U.S. states by non-Hispanic white population
