= Plurality of worlds =

Plurality of worlds may refer to:

- Cosmic pluralism, belief in numerous "worlds" which may harbour extraterrestrial life
- Conversations on the Plurality of Worlds, a 1686 book by Bernard Le Bovier de Fontenelle
- Of the Plurality of Worlds, an 1853 essay by William Whewell
- On the Plurality of Worlds, a 1986 book by David Lewis
- Plurality of Worlds (album), an album by PeroxWhy?Gen
