= Electricity sector of the United States =

Net electricity generation by energy source for 2024
1. ▲ Natural gas (43.4%)
2. ▼ Nuclear (18.1%)
3. ▼ Coal (15.1%)
4. ▲ Wind (10.5%)
5. ▼ Hydro (5.50%)
6. ▼ Solar (5.10%)
7. Biomass (1.10%)

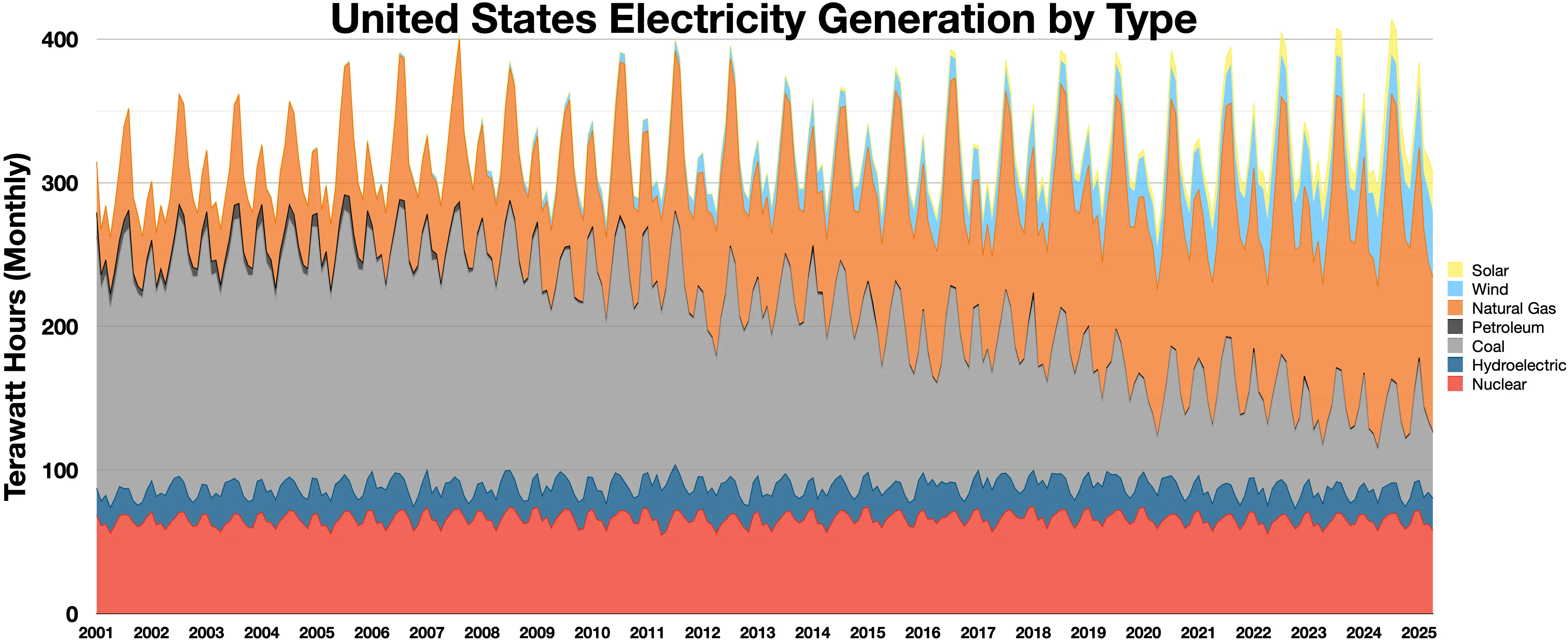
United States electricity production by type

The United States has the second largest electricity sector in the world, with 4,430 Terawatt-hours of generation in 2025. In 2024 the industry earned $514b in revenue (1.8% of GDP) at an average price of $0.129/kWh.

There are three major synchronous electrical grids in the continental US: the Eastern Interconnection, the Western Interconnection and the Texas Interconnection. Within these physical grids, there are Independent System Operators and Regional transmission organizations, which are not-for-profit organizations that operate an area of the grid and are obliged to provide indiscriminate access to various suppliers (e.g. power plant owners, transmission line providers) to promote competition. Some areas instead have a vertically integrated utility like Southern Company where everything is done by one company.

The U.S. electricity sector is regulated by different public institutions with some functional overlaps. The federal government sets general policies through the Department of Energy. Economic regulation of the distribution segment is a state responsibility, usually carried out through Public Utilities Commissions; the inter-state transmission segment is regulated by the federal government through the Federal Energy Regulatory Commission.

Electricity generation grew by about 5.5% between 2015 and 2024, but with significant changes in composition over that time. In 2013 coal was 38.8% of generation, natural gas was 27.6%, nuclear was 19.4%, wind was 4.1%, hydro was 6.6%, and solar was 0.2%. Because of this shift, CO_{2} emissions have gone down by 30%.

== Electricity generation ==
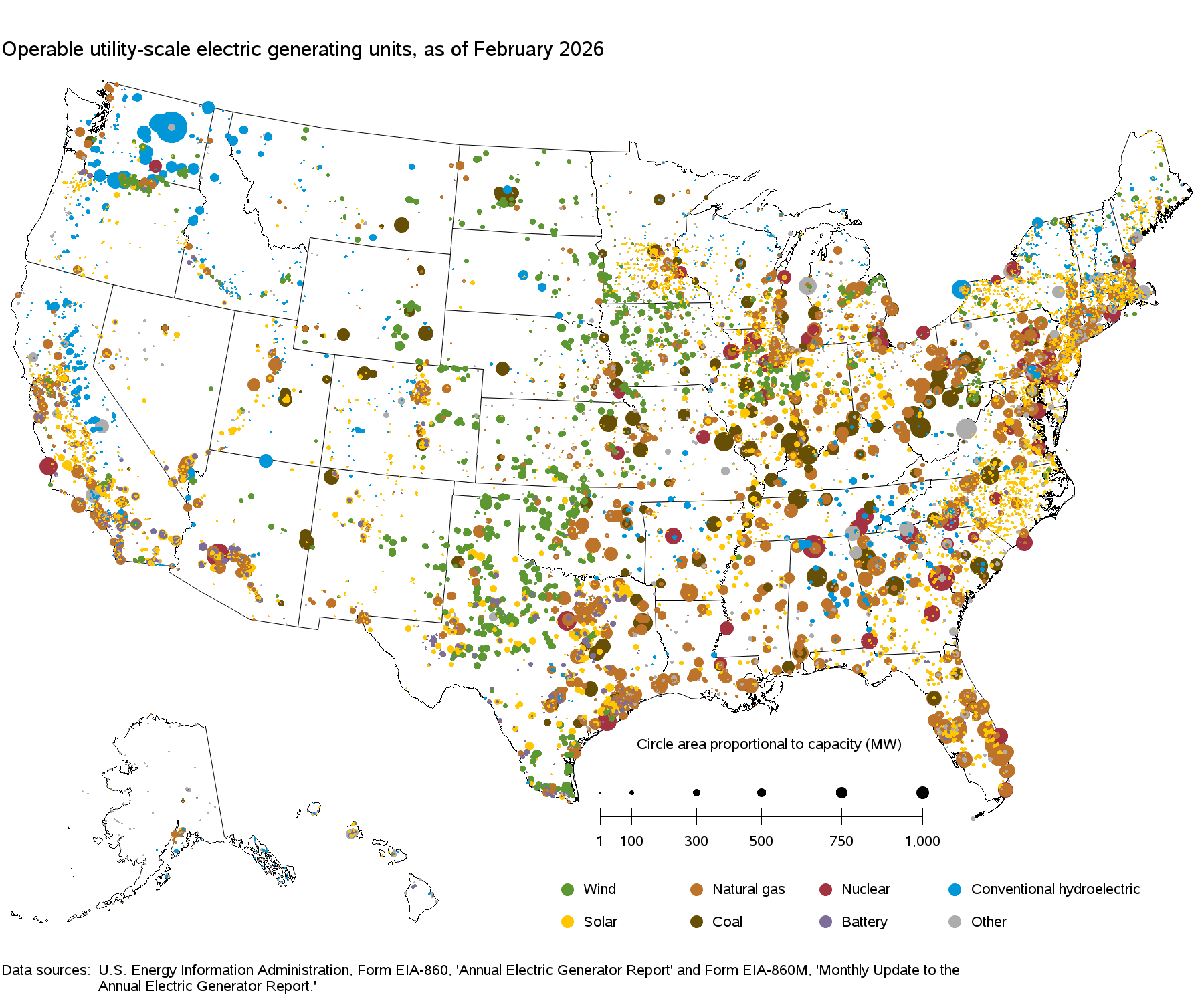
Current power plants map from the U.S. Energy Information Administration

In 2023, US generation scale installed electricity generation summer capacity in the United States was 1161.43 gigawatts (GW), up 15.57 GW from 2021. The main energy sources for electricity generation include

- Thermal/Fossil: 733.2 GW, up 1.38 GW (+0.02%) from 2021
- Wind: 141.4 GW, up 8.65 GW (+6.52%) from 2021
- Nuclear: 94.66 GW, down 0.89 GW (−0.93%) from 2021
- Hydropower: 80.07 GW, up 0.16 GW (0.2%) from 2021
- Solar: 143.8 GW, up 11.43 GW (+18.41%) from 2021
- Solar (small scale estimate): 39.83 GW, up 6.75 GW (+20.4%) from 2021

Actual USA utility scale electricity generation in 2022 was 4230.723 terawatt-hours (TWh) and was up 134.883 TWh (3.29%) from 2021. The USA also imported 56.97 TWh and exported 15.758 TWh:[16] making a total of 4271.88 TWh for consumption, up 114.78 TWh (2.78%) from 2021.

Electricity generation was primarily from the following sources:

- Thermal/Fossil: 2553.23 TWh, up 45.47 TWh (+1.8%) from 2021
- Nuclear: 771.54 TWh, down 8.11 TWh (-1.0%) from 2021
- Wind: 434.3 TWh, up 56.1 TWh (+14.83%) from 2021
- Hydropower: 254.70 TWh, up 2.6 TWh (+3.2%) from 2021
- Solar: 143.8 TWh, up 28.54 TWh (+24.76%) from 2021
- Solar (small scale estimate): 61.28 TWh, up 12.12 TWh (+24.6%) from 2021

The share of coal and nuclear in energy generation is much higher than their share in installed capacity, because coal and nuclear plants provide base load and thus are running longer hours than natural gas and petroleum plants which typically provide peak load, while wind turbines and solar plants produce electricity when they can and natural gas fills in as required to compensate.

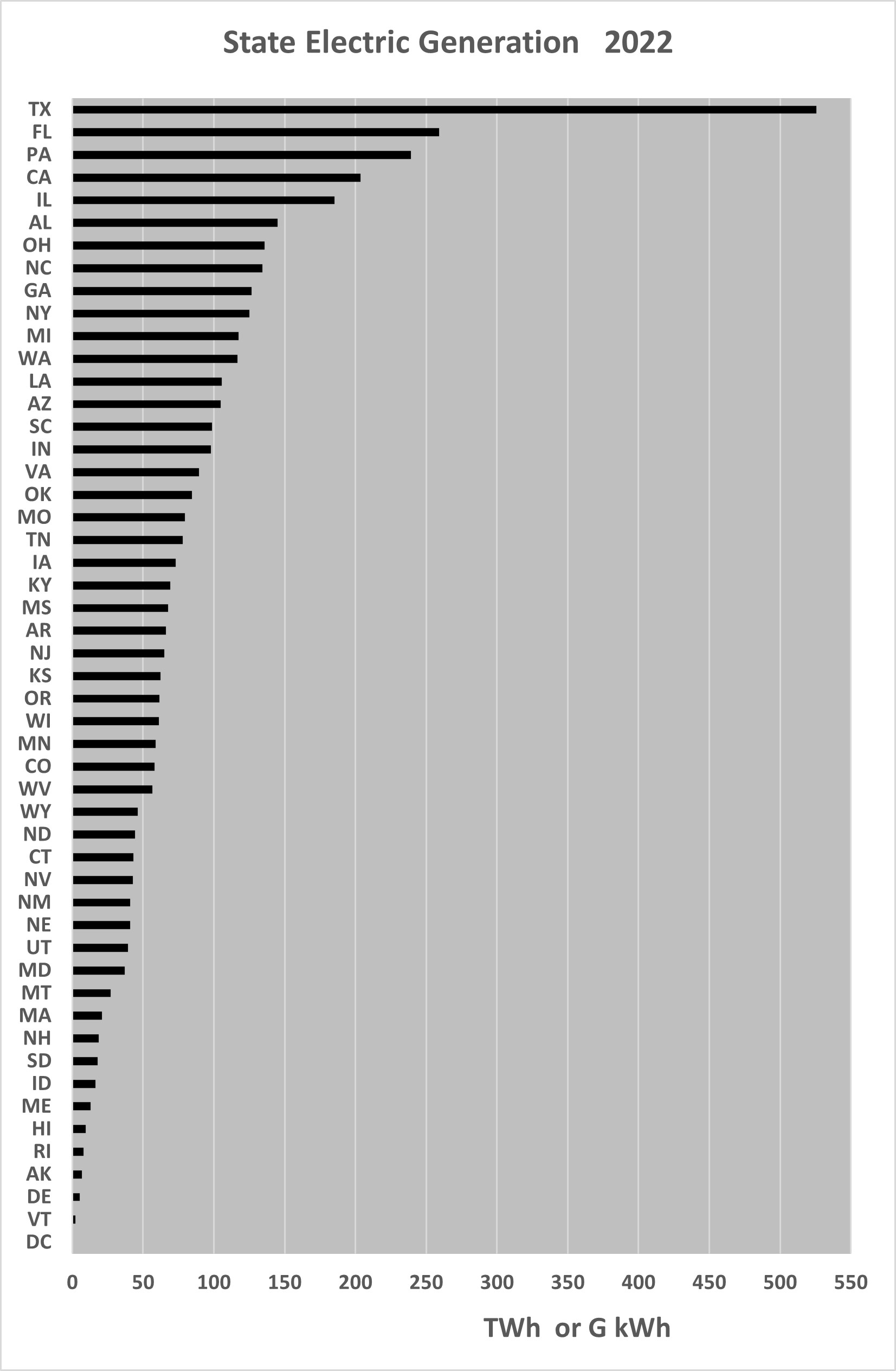
State Contribution to US Net Electric Generation

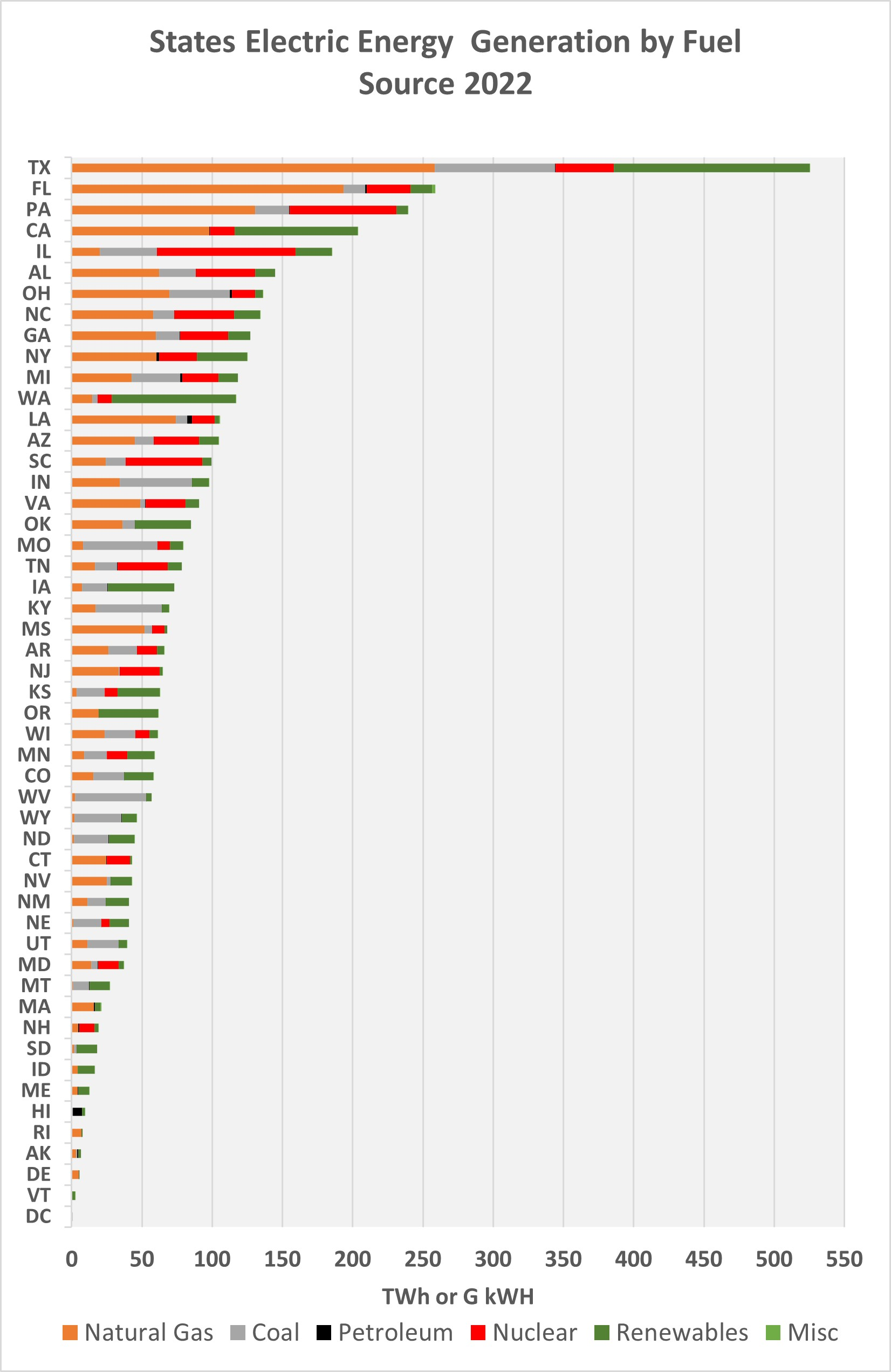
State Net Generation by Fuel Source

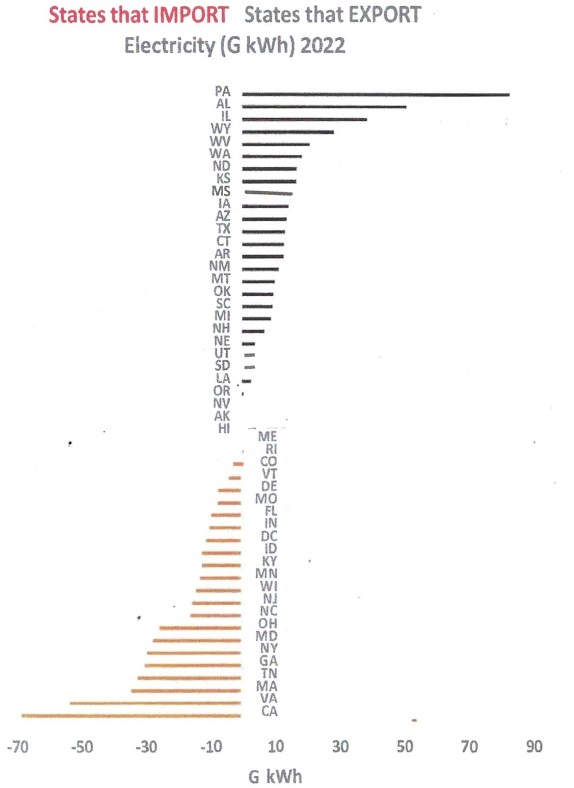
States by net energy imports / exports

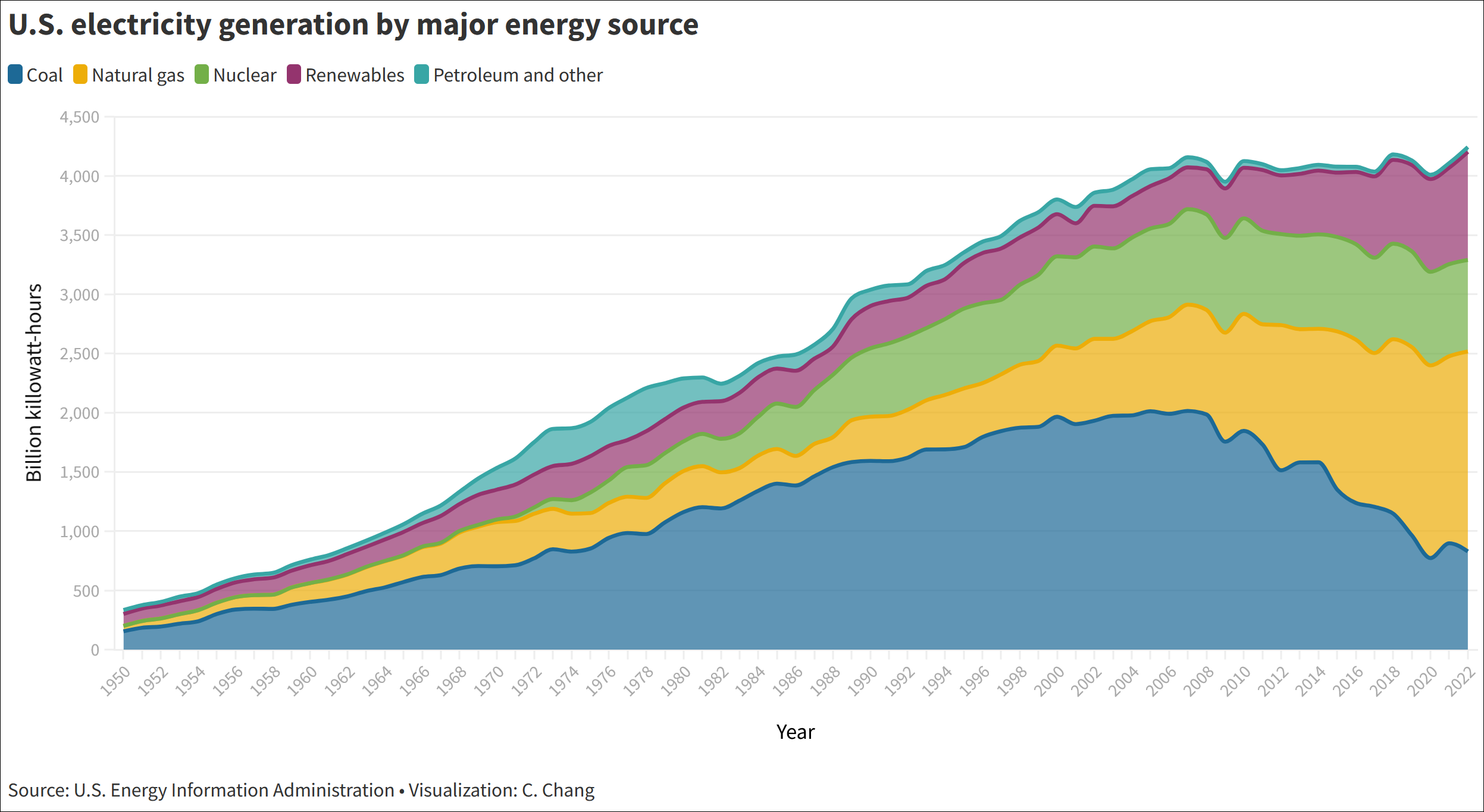
US electricity production by source

State Electric Energy Fuel Use %

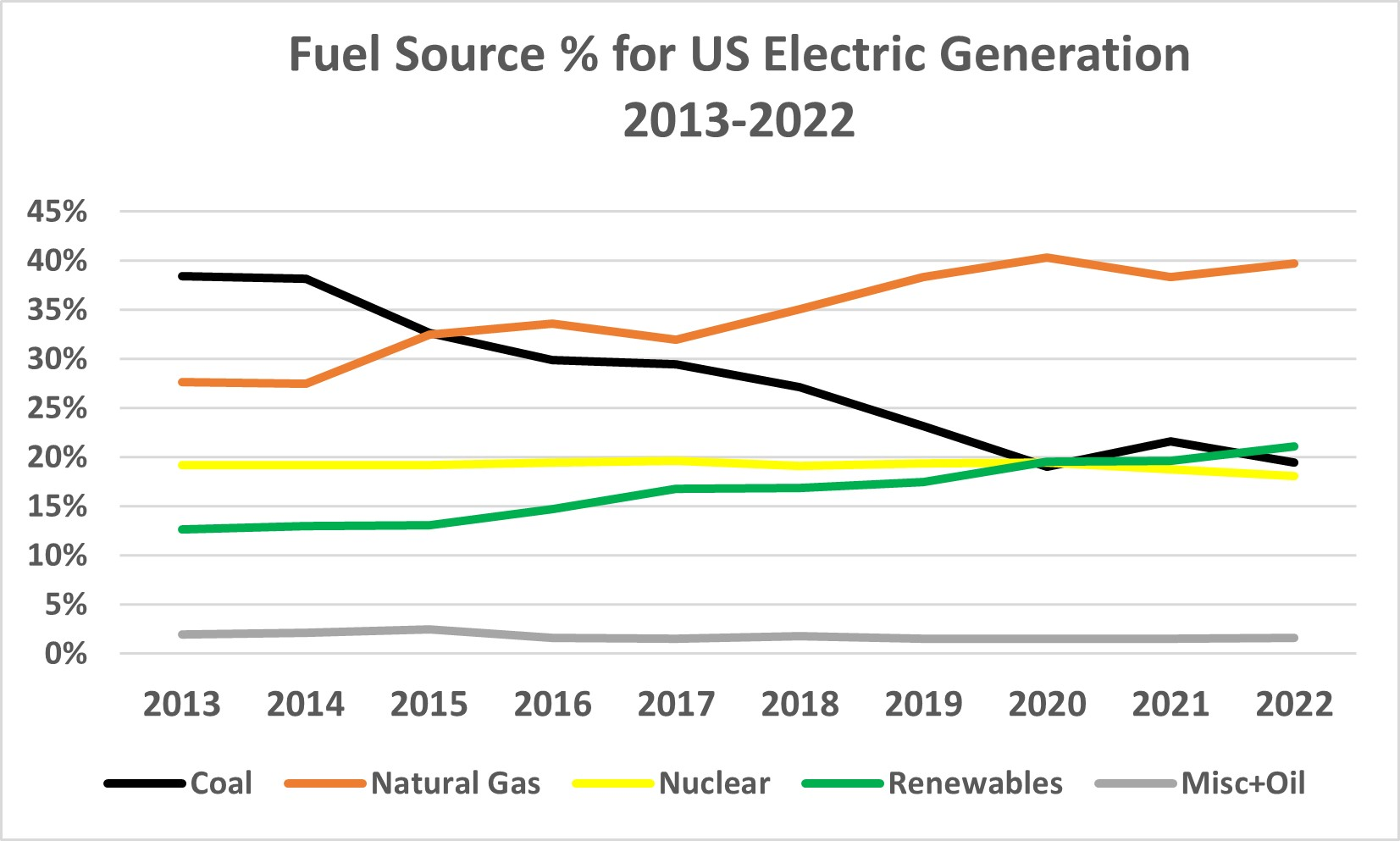
10 yr chart of fuel mix for electric

Yearly electric energy generation by fuel source (TWh)
Year	Fossil Fuel				Nuclear	Renewable							Misc	Total
Year	Coal	Oil	Gas	sub total	Nuclear	Hydro	Geo thermal	Solar	Wind	Wood	Bio (other)	sub Total	Misc	Total
2024*	652.16	15.09	1,880.75	2,548.00	781.87	242.90	15.41	219.83	451.90	31.56	14.86	976.46	16.12	4,322.45
Proportion 2024*	15.09%	0.35%	43.51%	58.95%	18.09%	5.62%	0.36%	5.09%	10.45%	0.73%	0.34%	22.59%	0.37%	100.0%
2023*	675.12	16.23	1,817.84	2,509.19	774.87	245.00	16.37	165.53	421.14	31.62	15.59	895.25	22.87	4,202.18
Proportion 2023*	16.07%	0.39%	43.26%	59.71%	18.44%	5.83%	0.39%	3.94%	10.02%	0.75%	0.37%	21.30%	0.54%	100.0%
2022*	831.51	22.93	1,698.79	2,553.23	771.54	254.79	16.09	143.79	434.30	35.46	16.38	900.82	46.29	4,271.88
2021*	898.0	19.17	1,590.56	2,507.76	779.65	251.59	15.98	115.26	378.2	36.46	17.79	815.27	46.34	4,149.01
2020	773.393	17.341	1,635.985	2,426.719	789.879	285.274	15.890	89.199	337.938	36.210	18.493	783.004	54.848	4,054.450
Proportion 2020	19.08%	0.43%	40.35%	59.85%	19.48%	7.04%	0.39%	2.20%	8.33%	0.89%	0.46%	19.56%	1.35%	100.0%
2019	964.957	18.341	1,598.405	2,581.703	809.409	287.874	15.473	71.937	295.882	38.543	18.964	728.673	47.114	4,166.900
2018	1,149.49	25.23	1,482.40	2,657.11	807.08	292.52	15.97	63.83	272.67	40.94	20.90	706.82	51.53	4,222.532
2017	1,205.84	21.39	1,308.89	2,536.12	804.95	300.33	15.93	53.29	254.30	41.15	21.61	686.61	62.90	4,090.58
2016	1,239.15	24.20	1,391.11	2,654.47	805.69	267.81	15.83	36.05	226.99	40.95	21.81	609.45	67.49	4,137.10
2015	1,352.40	28.25	1,346.60	2,727.25	797.18	249.08	15.92	24.89	190.72	41.93	21.70	544.24	75.61	4,144.27
Proportion 2015	32.63%	0.68%	32.49%	65.81%	19.24%	6.01%	0.38%	0.60%	4.6%	1.01%	0.52%	13.13%	1.82%	100.0%
2014	1,581.71	30.23	1,138.63	2,750.57	797.17	259.37	15.88	17.69	181.655	42.34	21.65	538.58	60.50	4,146.2
2013	1,581.12	27.16	1,137.69	2,745.97	789.02	268.57	15.78	9.04	167.84	40	20.83	522.07	55.64	4,112.7
2012	1,514.04	23.19	1,237.79	2,775.02	769.33	276.24	15.56	4.33	140.82	37.8	19.82	494.57	56.1	4,095
2011	1,733.4	30.2	1,025.3	2,788.9	790.2	319.4	15.3	1.82	120.2	37.4	19.2	513.32	46	4,138.4
2010	1,847.3	37.1	999.0	2,883.4	807.0	260.2	15.2	1.21	94.7	37.2	18.9	427.4	33.3	4,151.0
Proportion 2010	44.5%	0.9%	24.1%	69.5%	19.4%	6.3%	0.37%	0.029%	2.3%	0.9%	0.5%	10.3%	0.8%	100.0%
2009	1,755.9	38.9	931.6	2,726.5	798.9	273.4	15.0	0.89	73.9	36.1	18.4	417.7	41.4	3,984.4
2008	1,985.8	46.2	894.7	2,926.7	806.2	254.8	14.8	0.86	55.4	37.3	17.7	380.9	38.3	4,152.2
2007	2,016.5	65.7	910.0	2,992.2	806.4	247.5	14.6	0.61	34.5	39.0	16.5	352.7	36.6	4,188.0
2000	1,966	111	615	2,692	754	260	14	0.49	5.6	37.6	23	318.7	38.6	3,836
Proportion 2000	51.3%	2.9%	16.0%	70.2%	19.7%	7.2%	0.37%	0.013%	0.15%	1.0%	0.6%	9.3%	0.9%	100.0%
1999	1,881	118	571	2,570	728	319.5	14.8	0.50	4.5	37	22.6	392.8	55	3,723.8

- Gas includes natural gas and other gases.
- Solar includes photovoltaics and thermal, excludes small scale photovoltaics.
- Misc includes misc generation, pumped storage, and net imports.
- Bio Other includes waste, landfill gas, and other.
- Hydro excludes pumped storage (not an energy source, used by all sources, other than hydro).
- Total includes net imports.
- 2021 and 2022 data is from Electric Power Annual 2022

The following tables summarize the electrical energy generated by fuel source for the United States. Electric Power Annual for 2022 data.

Electricity generation in the United States in 2022
Power Source	Plants	Summer Capacity (GW)	% of total Capacity	Capacity factor	Annual Energy (billion kWh)	% of Total U.S.
Coal	242	189.3	16.30%	0.50	831.51	19.46%
Nat Gas+	2106	504.25	43.42%	0.38	1698.79	39.77%
Nuclear	54	94.66	8.15%	0.93	771.54	18.06%
Hydro	1445	80.07	6.89%	0.36	254.79	5.96%
Other Renewables	7084	228.92	19.71%	0.32	646.03	15.12%
Petroleum	1084	30.76	2.65%	0.09	22.93	0.54%
Other	483	10.41	0.90%	0.12	11.11	0.26%
Storage	40	23.04	1.98%	-0.03	-6.03	-0.14%
Net Imports					41.21	0.96%
Total	12538	1161.43	100.00%	0.42	4271.88	100.00%

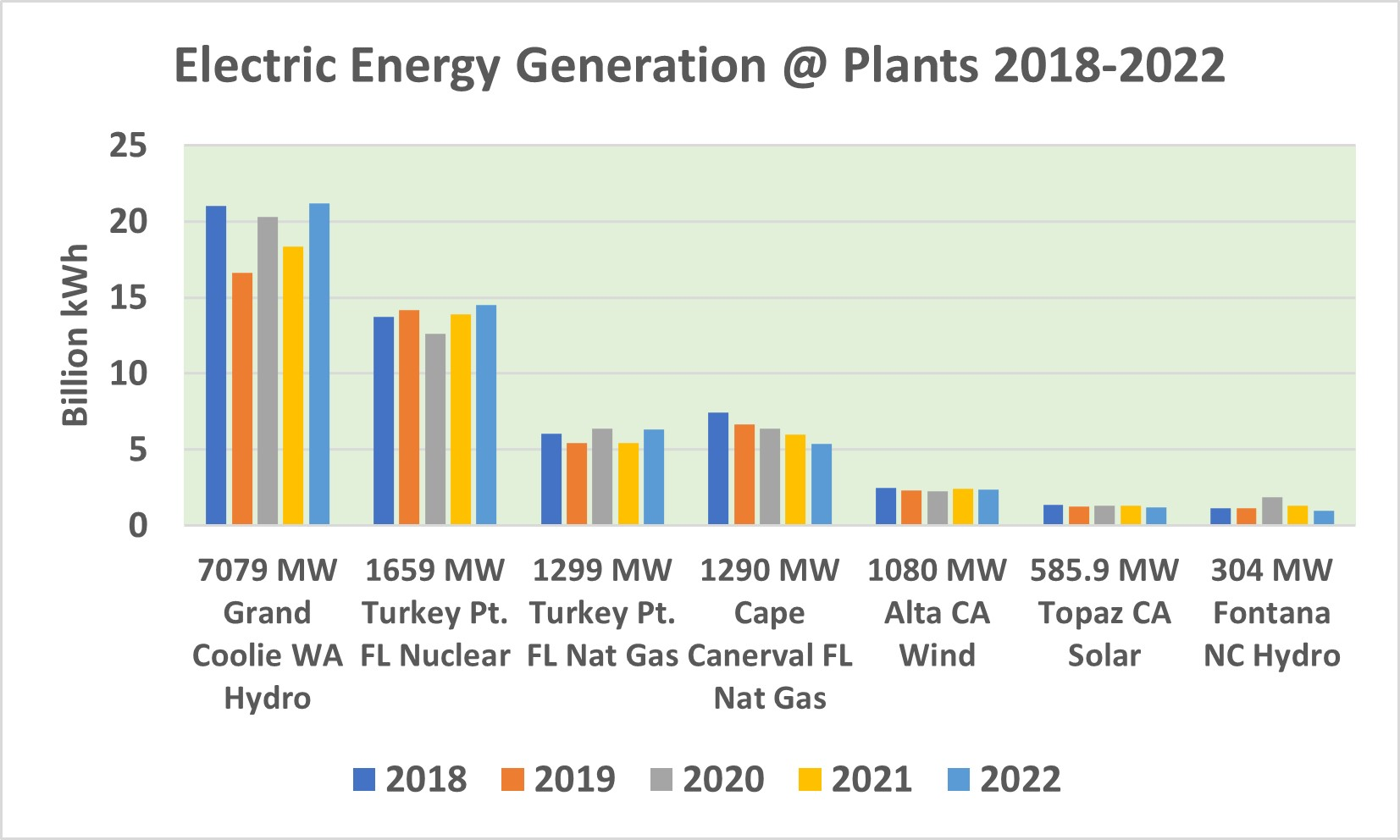
Electric Energy Generation @ Plants 2018–2022

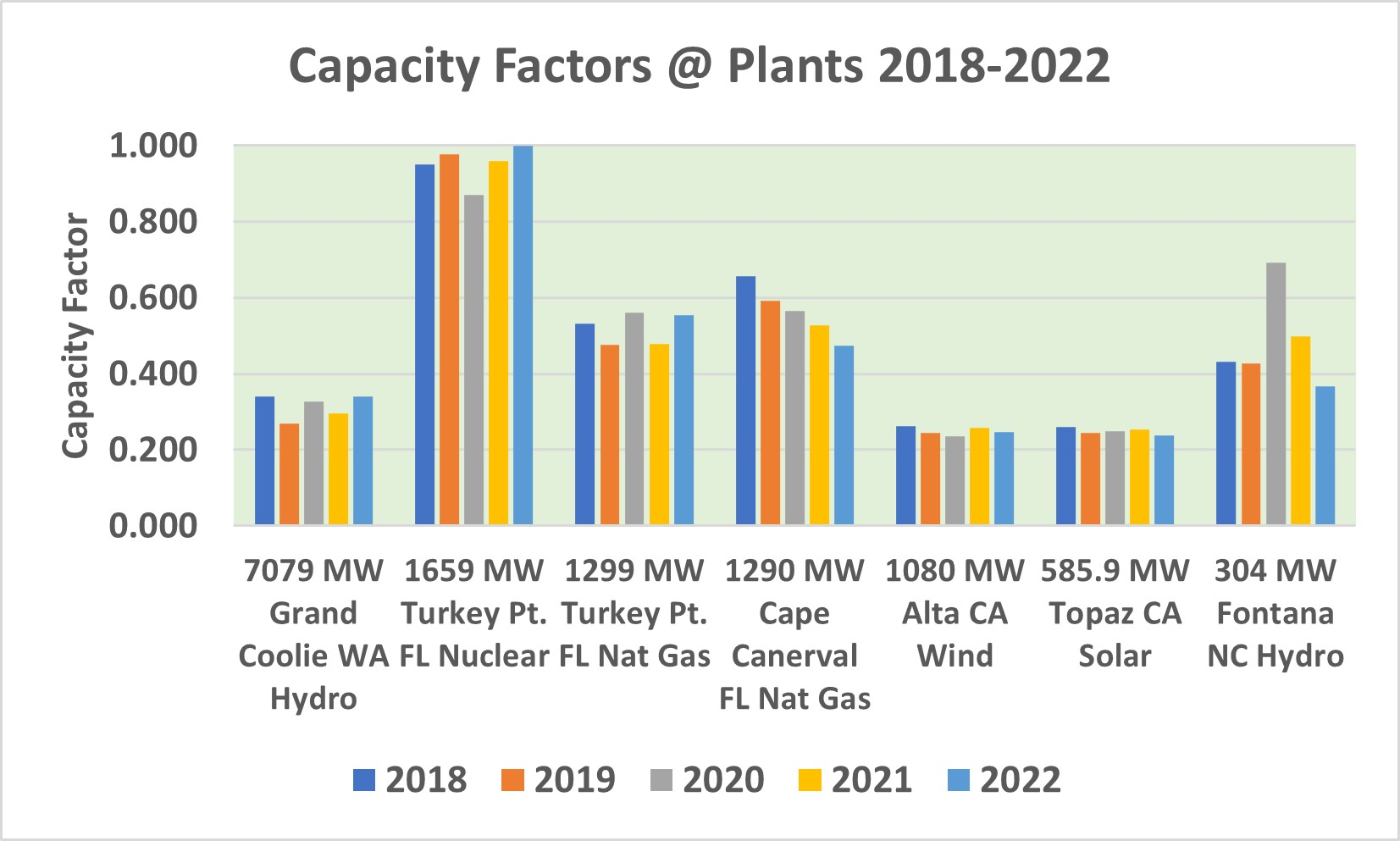
Capacity Factors @ Plants 2018–2022

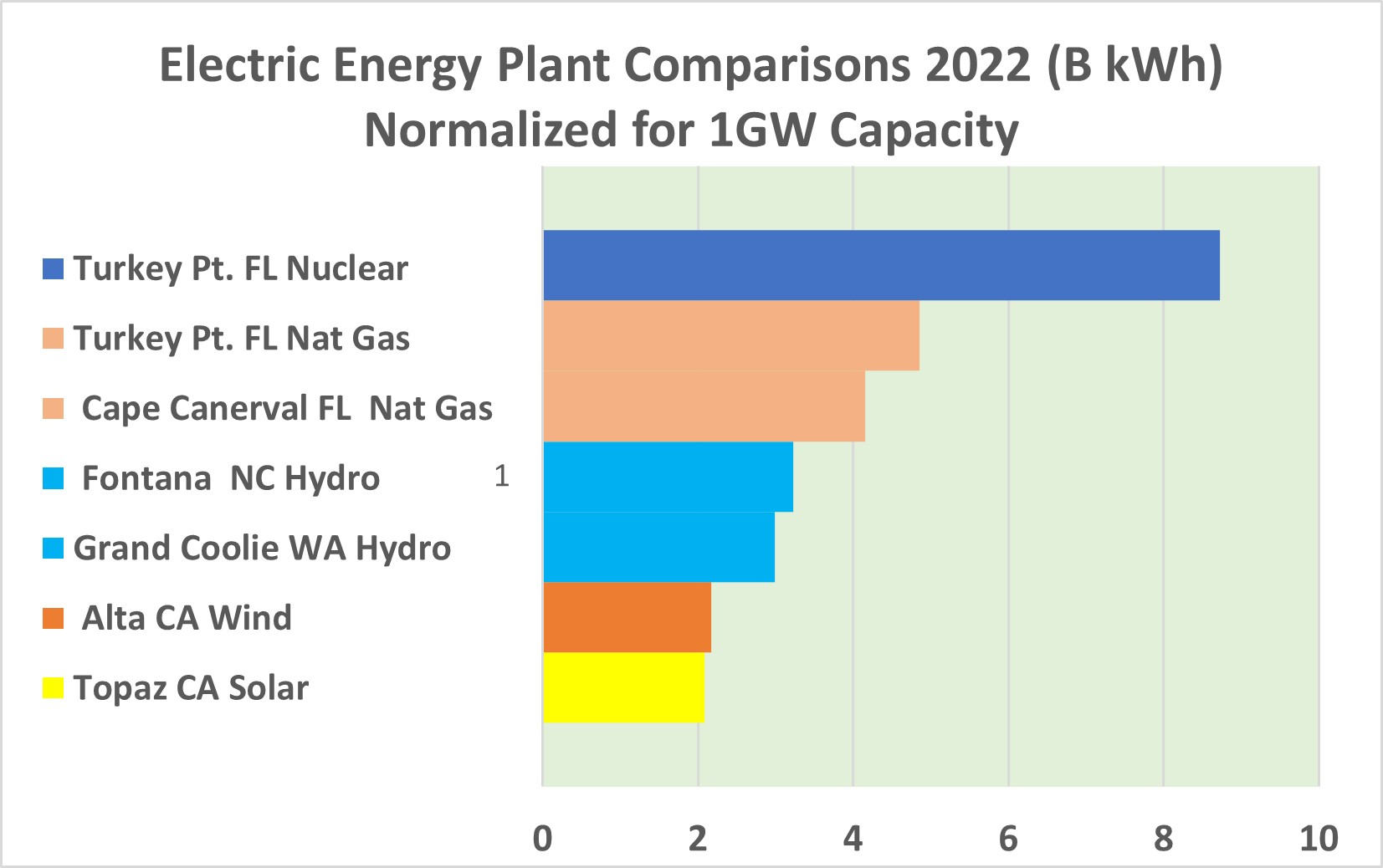
Electric Energy Plant Comparisons 2022 (B kWh) Normalized for 1GW Capacity

=== Fossil fuel ===
Fossil fuels—mainly coal and natural gas—remain the backbone of electricity generation in the U.S., accounting for 68% of installed generation capacity in 2010 and 63.1% in 2022. Coal production has fallen significantly since 2007 with most of the losses being replaced by natural gas, but also a growing fraction of non-hydroelectric renewables.

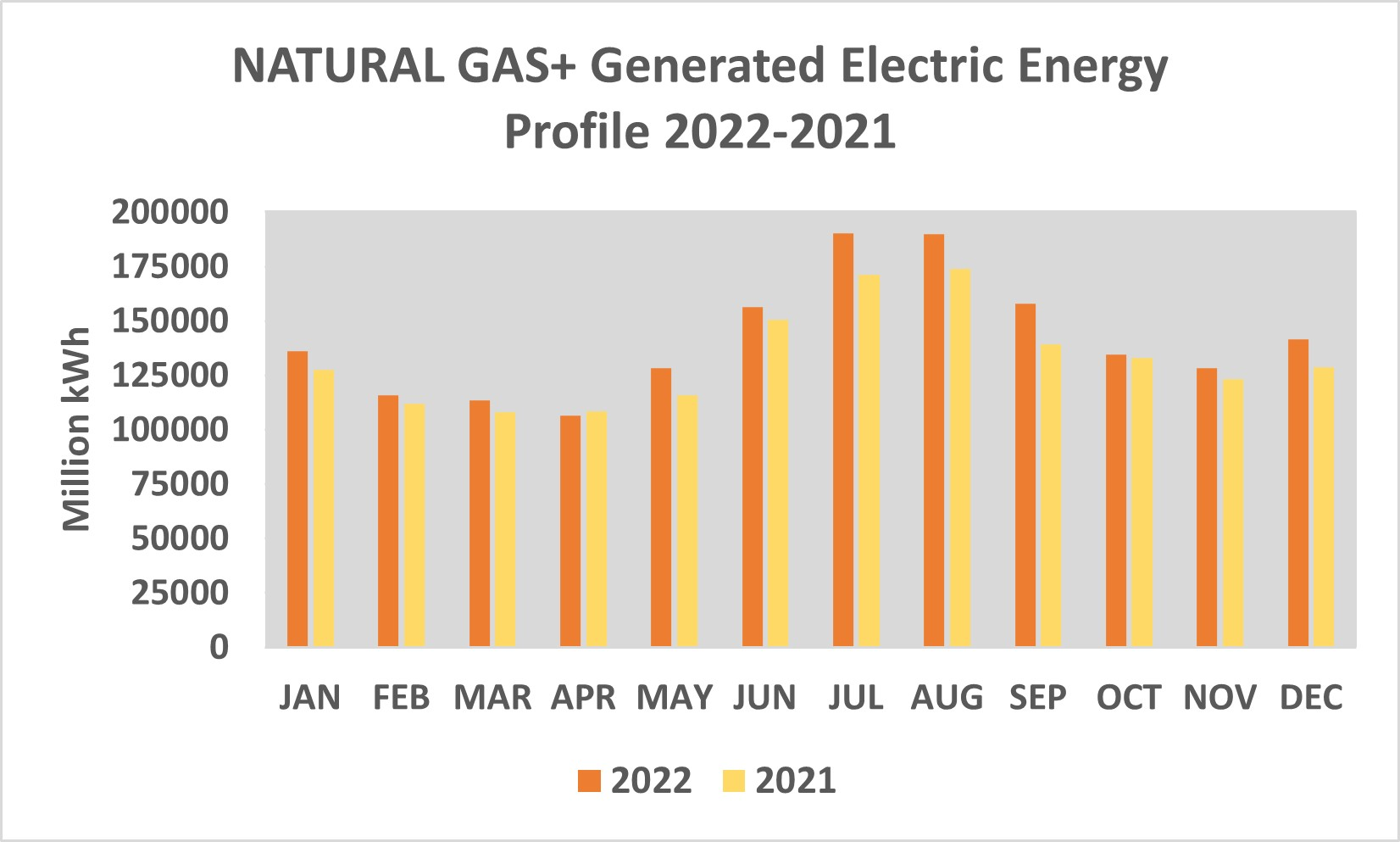
NATURAL GAS+ Generated Electronic Energy 2022–2021

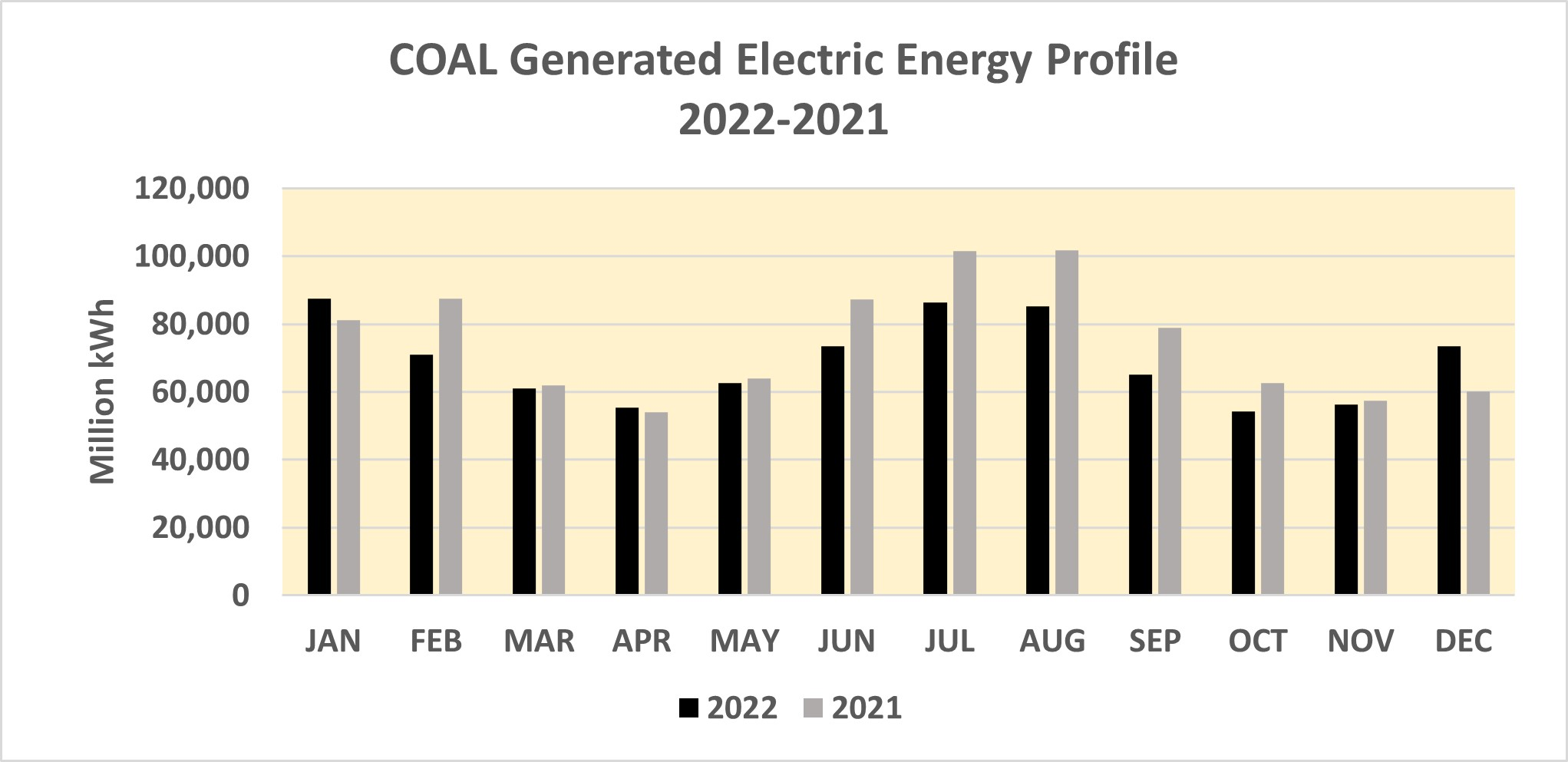
COAL Generated Electric Energy Profile 2022–2021

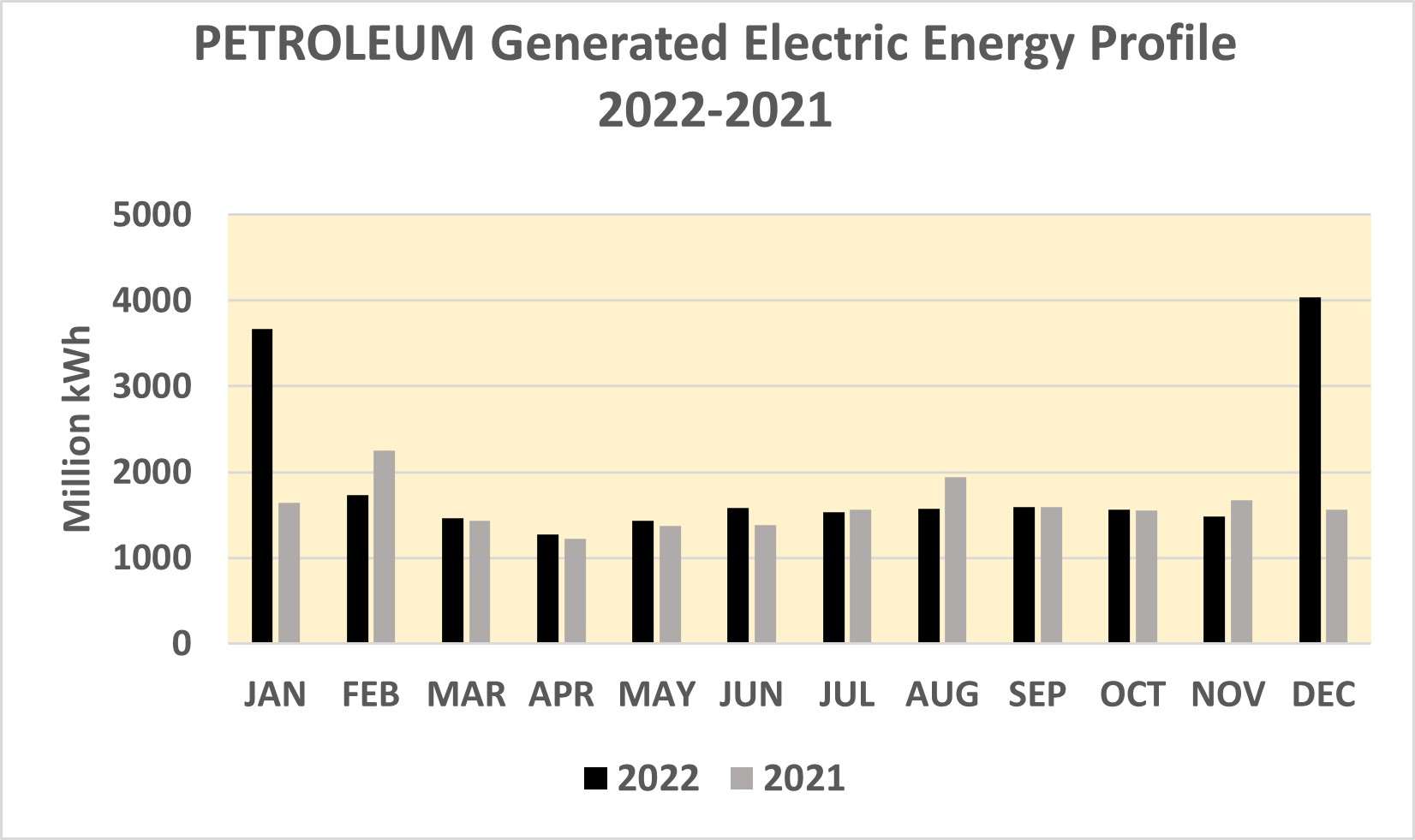
PETROLEUM Generated Electric Energy Profile 2022–2021

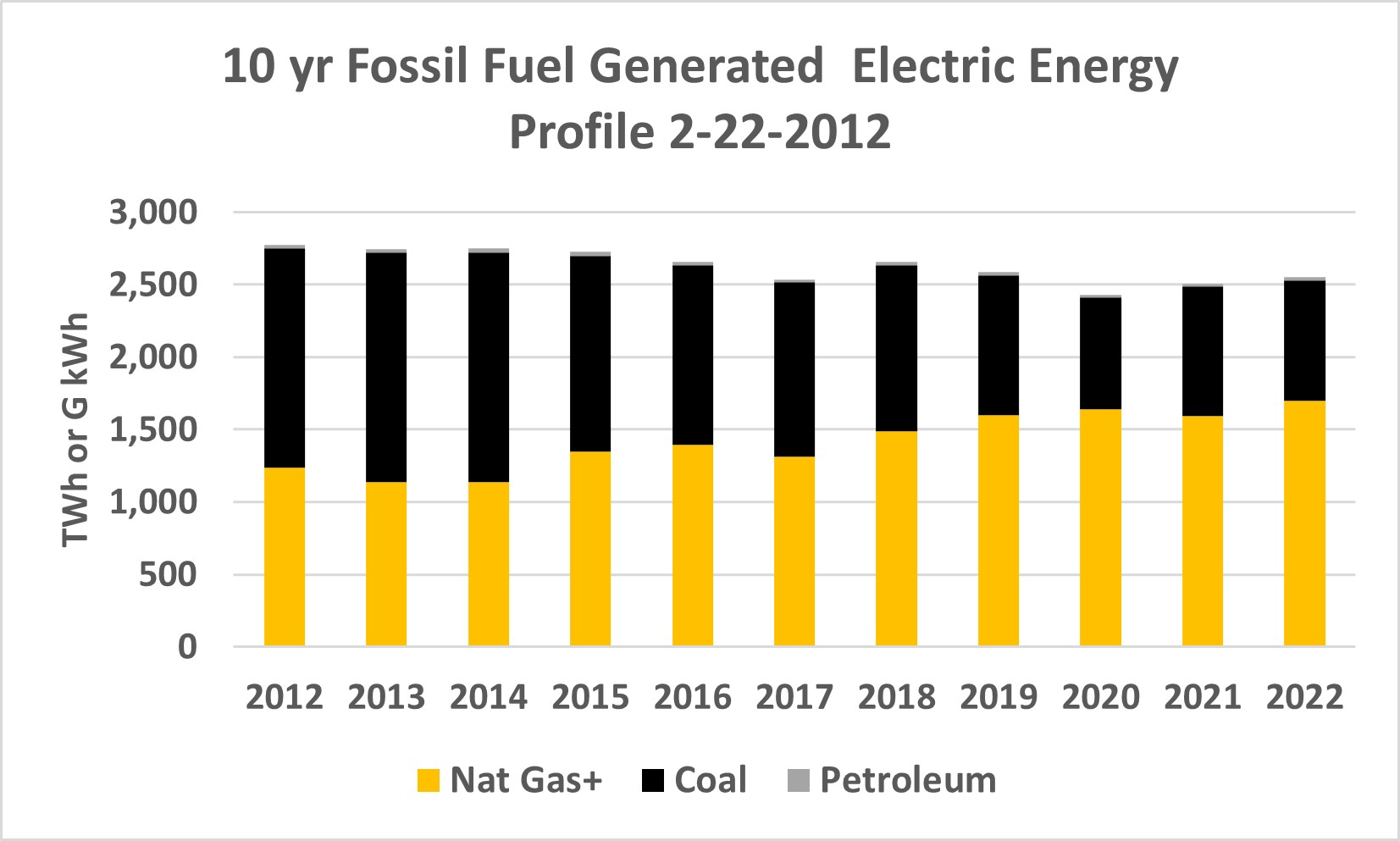
10 yr Fossil Fuel Generated Electric Energy Profile 2022–2012

In 2007 the Department of Energy estimated the planned additional capacity for 2008–12 at 92 GW, most of which to be fueled by natural gas (48 GW) and coal (19 GW).

=== Nuclear power ===
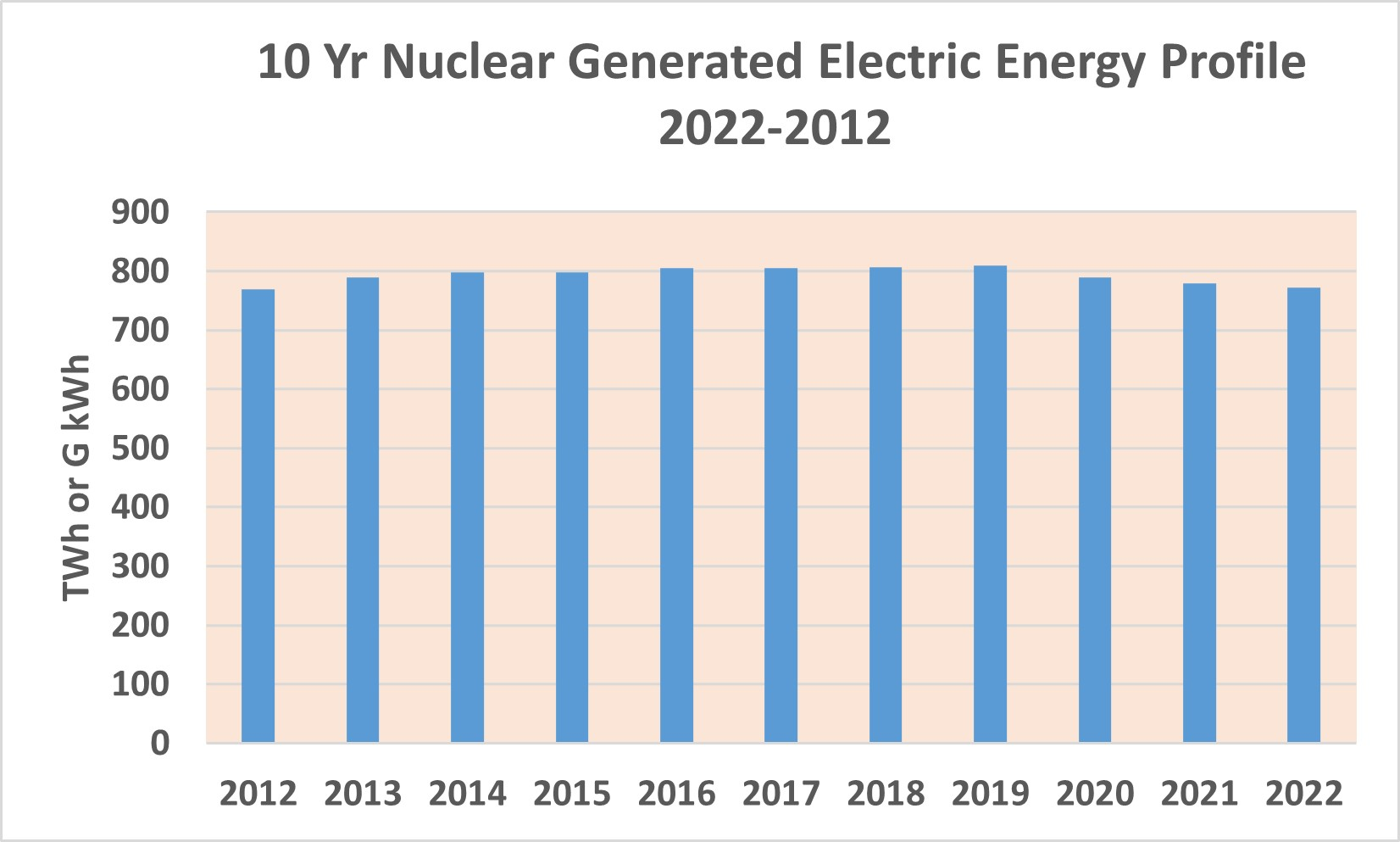
10 Yr Nuclear Generated Electric Energy Profile 2022-2012

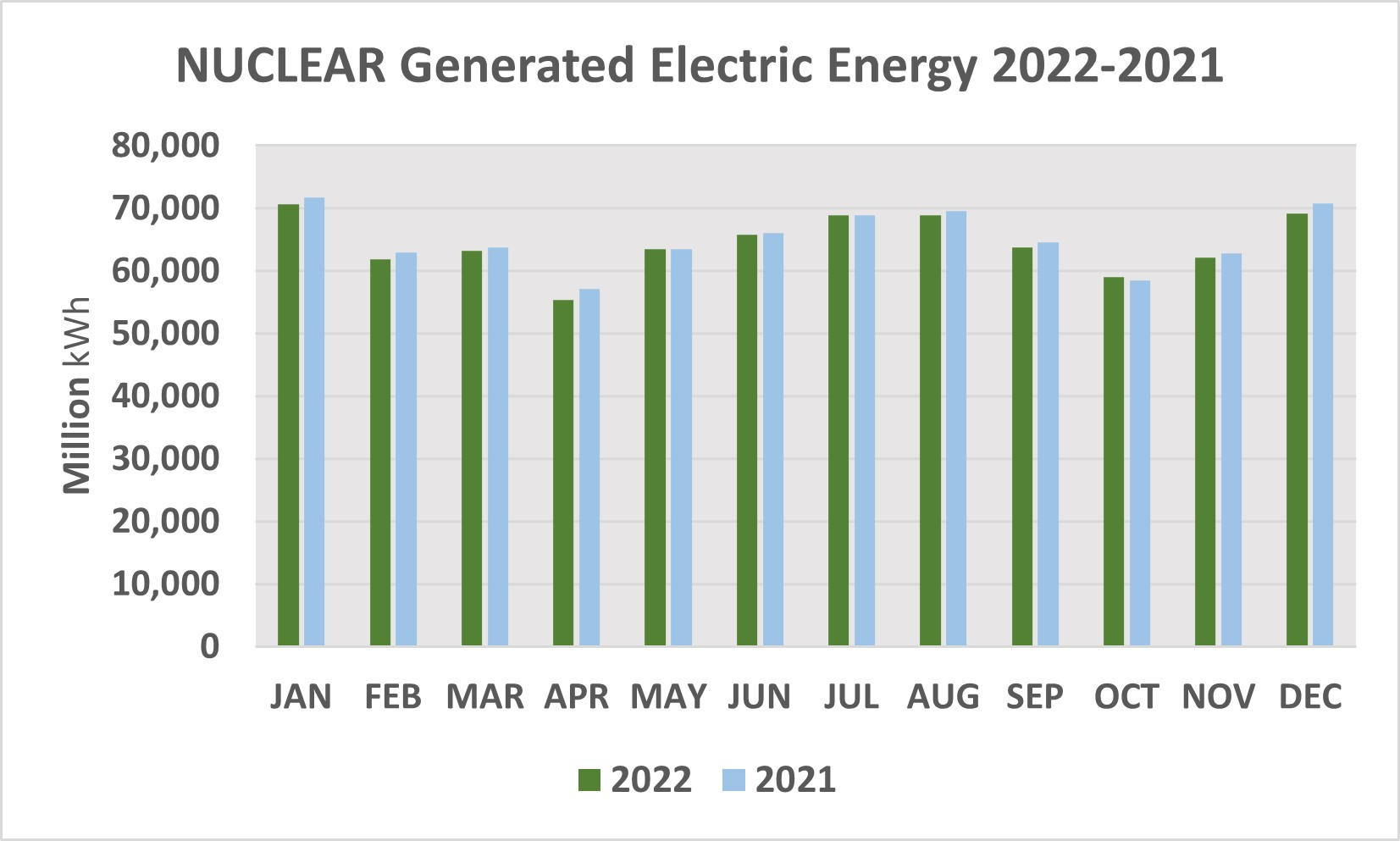
NUCLEAR Generated Electric Energy Profile 2022-2021

As of 2007 in the United States, there are 104 commercial nuclear reactors in the US, generating approximately 20% of the nation's total electric energy consumption. For many years, no new nuclear plants have been built in the US. However, since 2005 there has been a renewed interest in nuclear power in the US. This has been facilitated in part by the federal government with the Nuclear Power 2010 Program of 2002. and the Energy Policy Act. As of March 9, 2009, the U.S. Nuclear Regulatory Commission had received applications for permission to construct 26 new nuclear power reactors However, as of 2013 most of the new applications had been abandoned due to the low cost of electricity generated with natural gas which had become available at cheap prices due to the boom in hydraulic fracturing; electricity produced using natural gas being 4 cents per kilowatt-hour versus 10 cents, or more, for nuclear.

=== Renewable energy ===
The following table summarizes the electrical energy generated by renewable fuel sources for the US. Data was obtained from Electric Power Annual 2022.

Growth in renewable-source electricity generation has been led by wind and solar while hydropower has remained flat

Though the share of US electricity generated from renewable sources has increased since 2010, the country still lages other major world regions.

Electric Production by Renewables in 2022
Power Source	Summer Capacity (GW)	% of Renewable Capacity	% of Total Capacity	Capacity Factor	Annual Energy (billion kWh)	% of Renewable Energy	% of U.S. Generation
Wind	141.4	45.74%	12.17%	0.35	434.3	48.21%	10.17%
Hydro	80.07	25.90%	6.87%	0.36	254.79	28.28%	5.96%
Solar	72.86	23.57%	6.27%	0.23	143.8	15.96%	3.37%
Biomass	12.13	3.92%	1.04%	0.49	51.84	5.75%	1.21%
Geothermal	2.65	0.86%	0.23%	0.69	16.09	1.79%	0.38%
Total	309.11	100.00%	26.61%	0.33	900.82	100.00%	21.09%

Note: Biomass includes wood and wood derived fuel, landfill gas, biogenic municipal solid waste and other waste biomass.

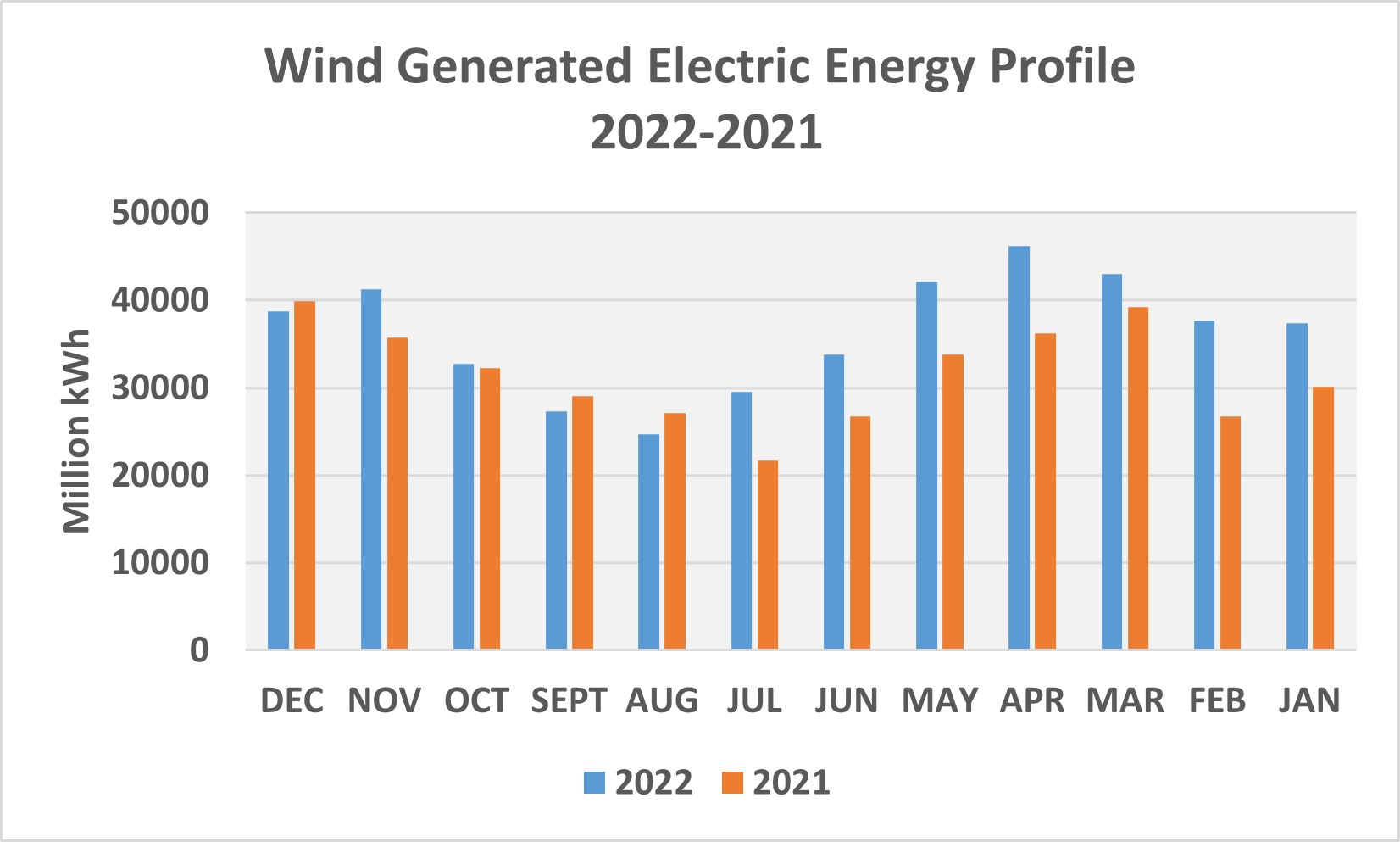
Wind Generated Electric Energy Profile 2022–2021

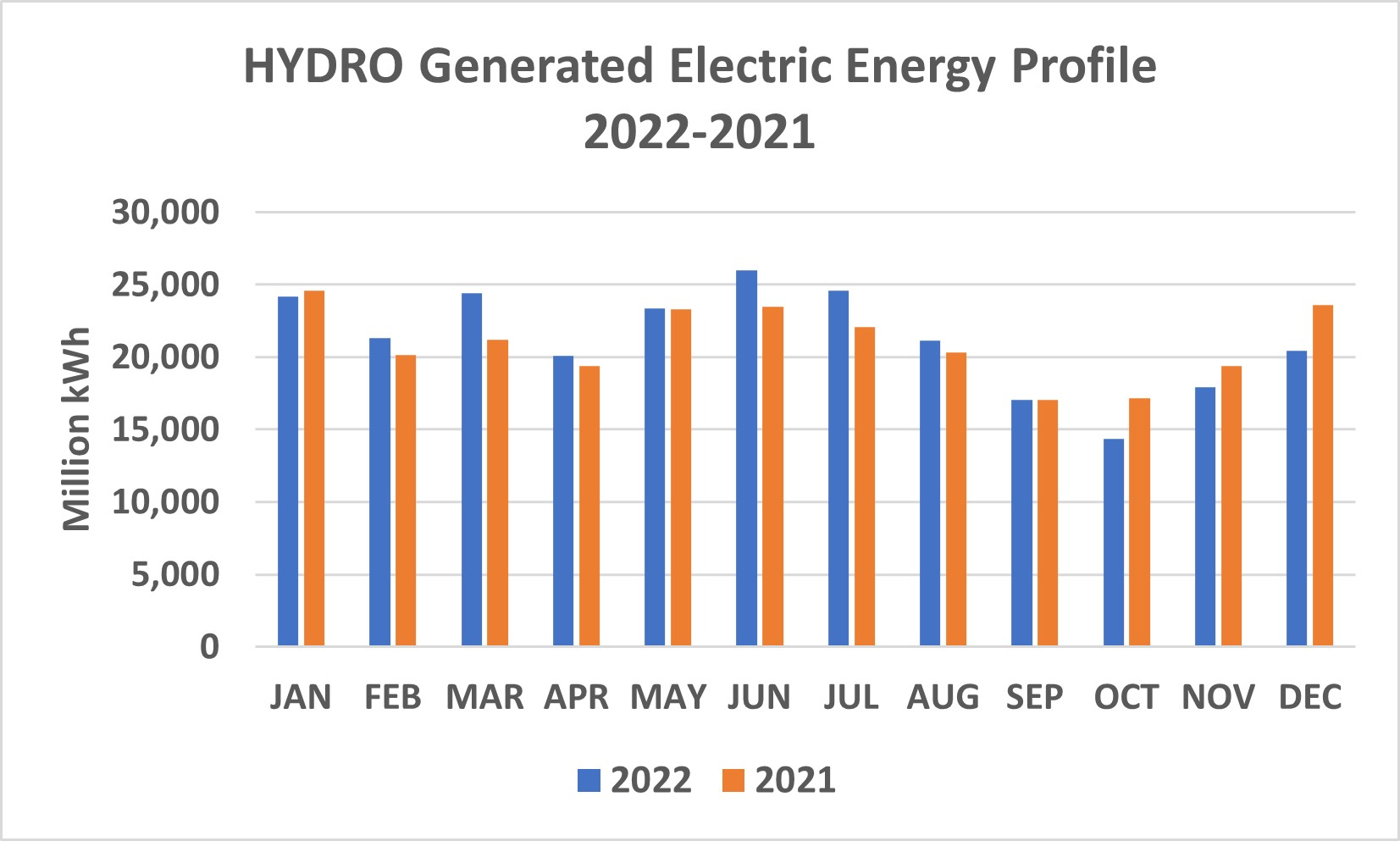
HYDRO Generated Electric Energy Profile 2022–2021

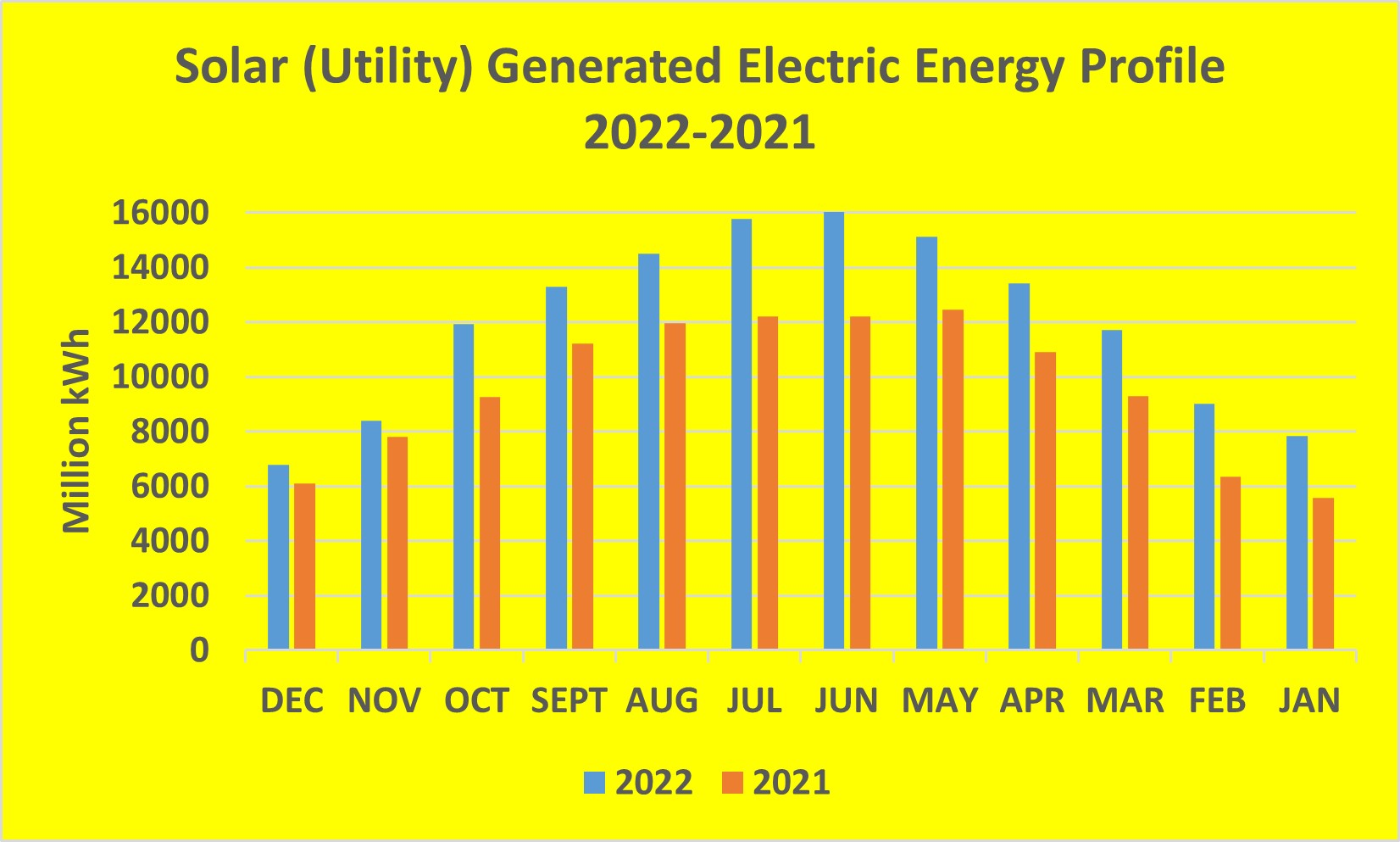
Solar (Utility) Generated Electric Energy Profile 2022–2021

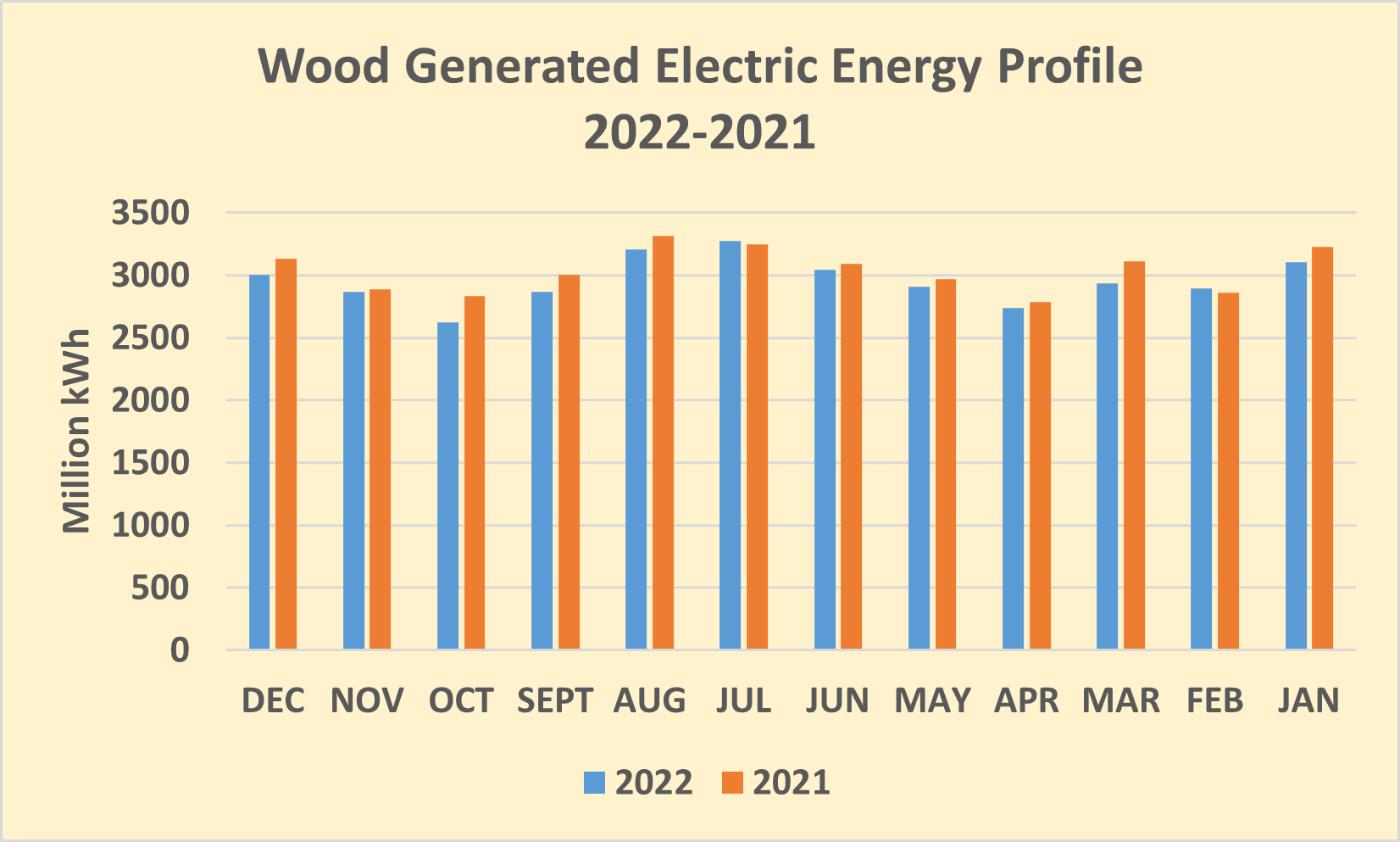
Wood Generated Electric Energy Profile 2022–2021

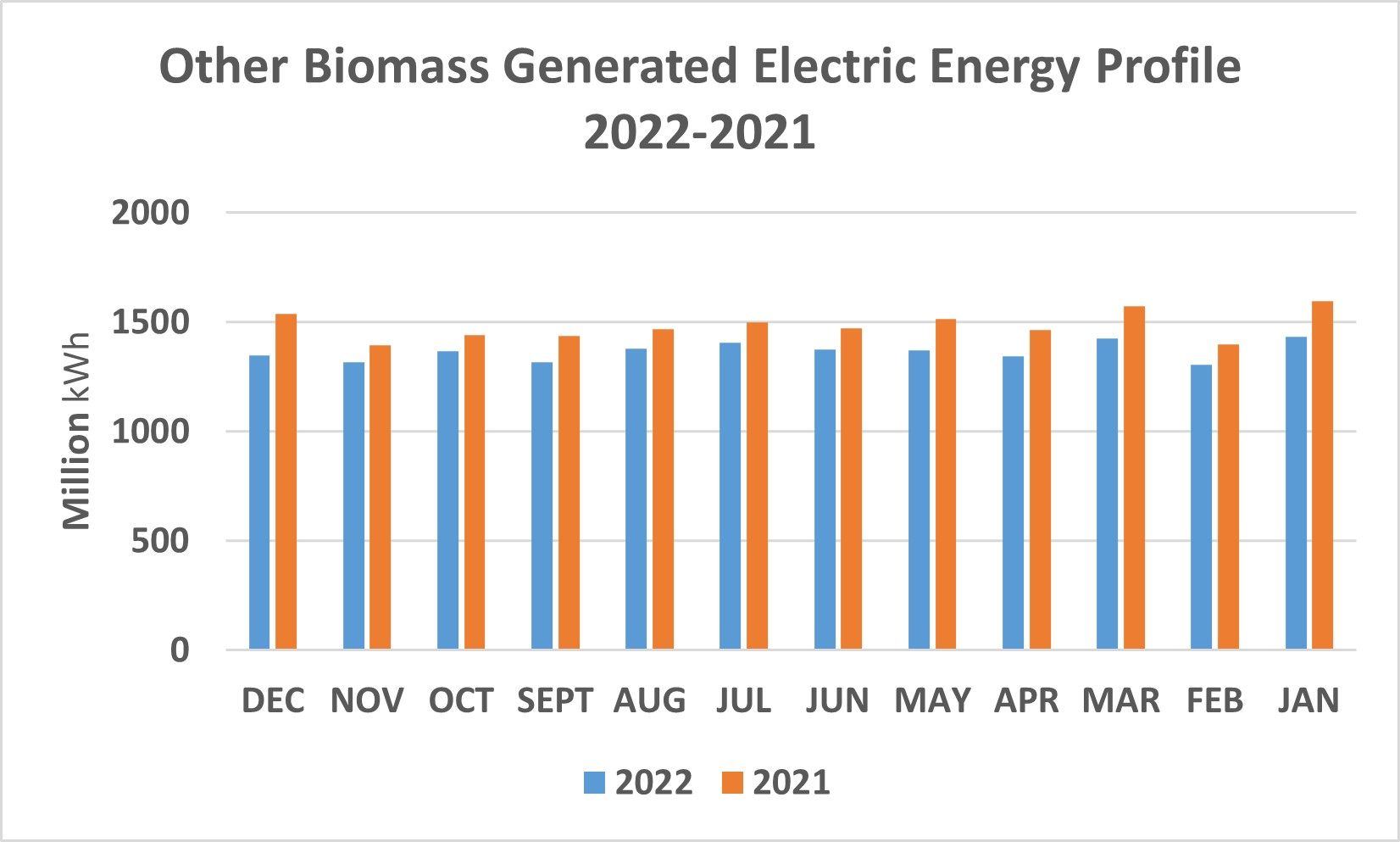
Other Biomass Generated Electric Energy Profile 2022–2021

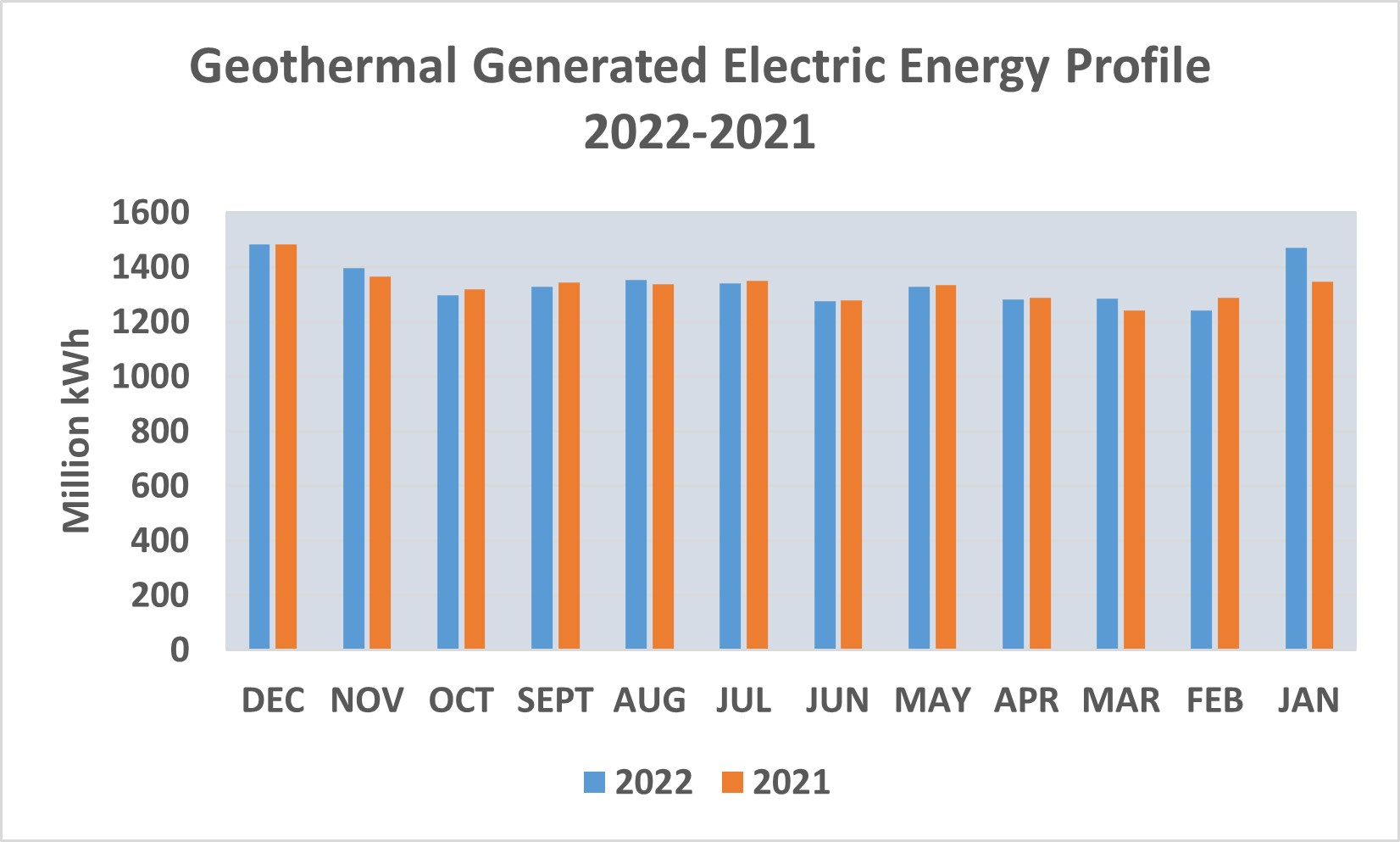
Geothermal Generated Electric Energy Profile 2022–2021

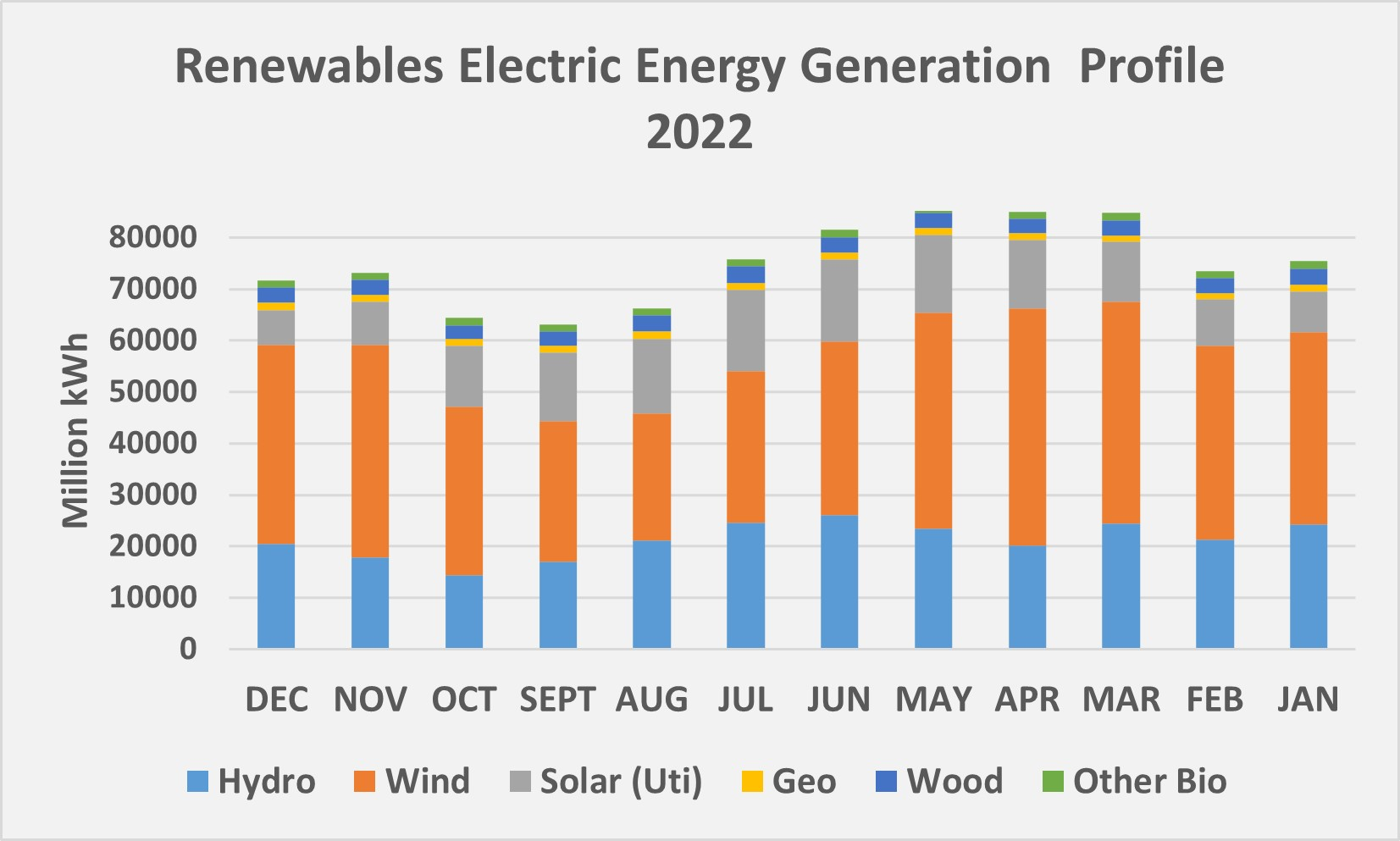
Renewables Electric Energy Generation Profile

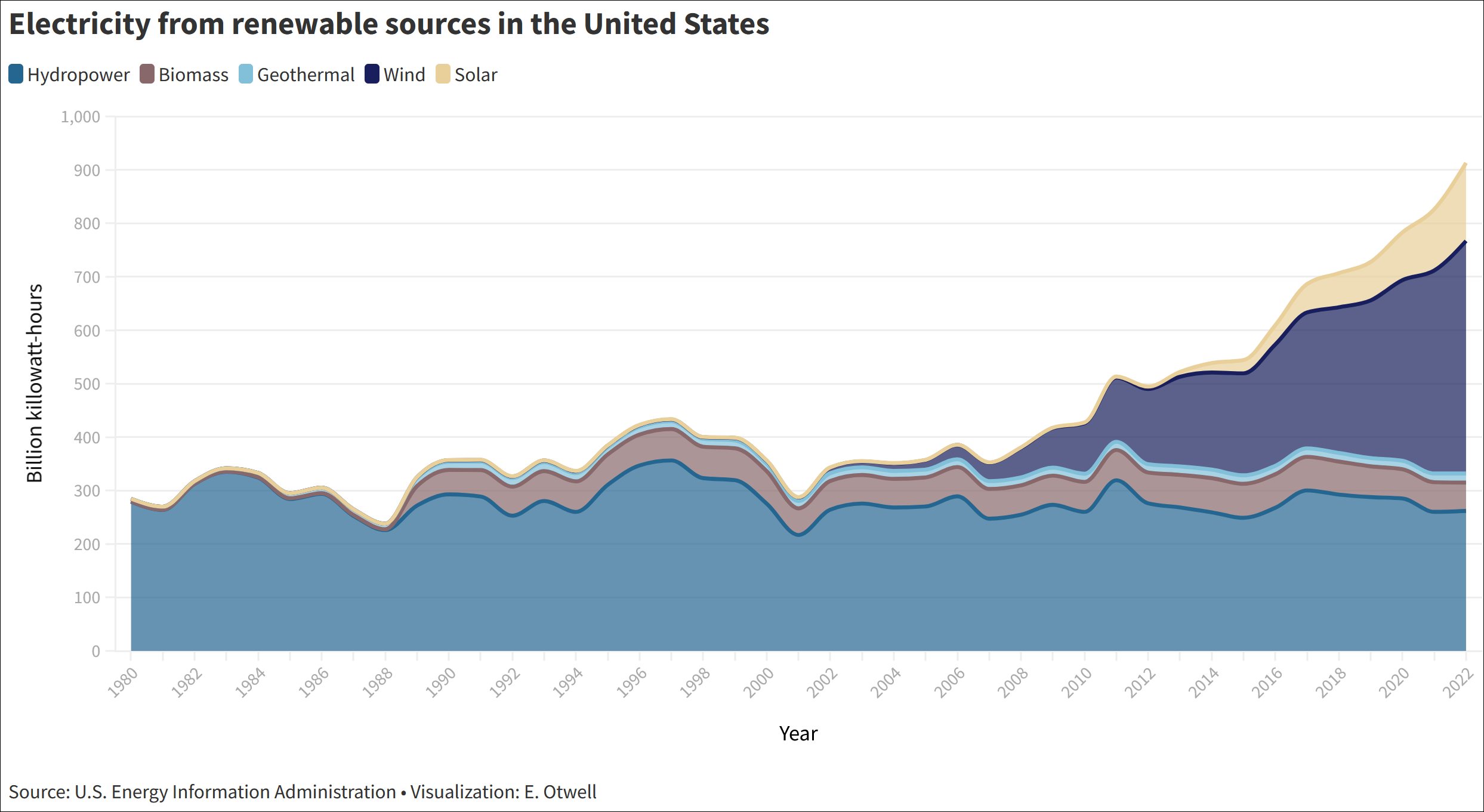
Timeline of electricity from renewable sources in the United States

The development of renewable energy and energy efficiency marks "a new era of energy exploration" in the United States, according to President Barack Obama. In a joint address to the Congress on February 24, 2009, President Obama called for doubling renewable energy within the next three years. From the end of 2008 to the end of 2011 renewable energy increased by 35% and from the end of 2008 till the end of 2014, 41.4%. In reality it took twelve years instead of three to double as 2020 saw a 100% increase from 2008.

Renewable energy accounted for more than 22.4% percent of the domestically produced electric energy used in the United States in 2022, up from 12.2% in 2012. All renewables have increased by 1.92X in the last decade. Wind production in 2022 was 10.17% of all production and has grown 2.9X over the last decade. Over this same time period solar( including small scale) has increased by 13.1X and now provides 3.37% of US electric energy needs. Utility scale solar has grown 11.1X over the last decade and in the last eight years of estimating small scale solar it has grown by 5.4X.

According to a report by the Interior Department, U.S. wind power – including off-shore turbines – could more than meet U.S. electricity needs. The Department of Energy has said wind power could generate 20% of US electricity by 2030.

Several solar thermal power stations, including the new 64 MW Nevada Solar One, have also been built. The largest of these solar thermal power stations is the SEGS group of plants in the Mojave Desert with a total generating capacity of 354 MW, making the system the largest solar plant of any kind in the world.

== Electricity consumption ==
Electricity consumption data in this section is based upon data mined from US DOE Energy Information Administration/Electric Power Annual 2022 files In 2022 the total US consumption of electricity was 4,271.88 terawatt-hours (TWh). Consumption was up from 2021, by 122.87 TWh or +2.96%. This is broken down as:

- Residential customers (139.894 million) directly consumed 1,509.23 TWh, or 35.23% of the total. This was up 38.74 TWh (+2.6%) from 2021. An average residential customer used 899 kWh/month and with the average US residential cost of $0.1504/kWh the average monthly electrical bill would be $135.27, up $14.25 (+11.77% from 2021.
- Commercial customers (19.258 million) directly consumed 1,390.87 TWh or 32.56% of the total. This was more (62.43 TWh) than in 2021 with over 155 thousand new customers. An average commercial customer used 6,019 kWh/month and with the average US commercial electric cost of $0.1241/kWh the average monthly electrical bill would be $746.96 up $96.76 (+14.9%) from 2021 . Demand from data centers (4% of total in 2022) and artificial intelligence trainers, new/expanded clean-tech factories, and crypto-mining became a significant component of overall demand in the 2020s. Affected states include Georgia, Texas, Virginia, Arizona, Oregon, Maryland, Kansas, Nebraska, Wisconsin, and South Carolina. Some large consumers are building their own energy production facilities independent of the grid.
- Industrial customers (1,049.983 thousand up 27.8 thousand from 2021) directly consumed 1020.486 TWh or 23.89% of the total. This was a more (19.85 TWh) than in 2021 (+2%).
- Transportation customers (86) directly consumed 6.599 TWh or 0.15% of the total. This was a little higher by 0.265 TWh(+4.1%) than in 2021 TWh) .
- System loss throughout the total electrical grid infrastructure by direct use of the suppliers (139.726 TWh) and for transmission and other system losses and for unaccounted for loads (204.989 TWh) amounts to 344.719 TWh or 8.07% of the total which is down by 0.2% from 2021. Thus, the US electric distribution system is 91.93% efficient and efficiency has improved slightly over the last year.

In addition from consumption from the electrical grid, the US consumers consumed an estimated additional 61.282 (up 12.12 TWh from 2021) TWh from small scale solar systems.

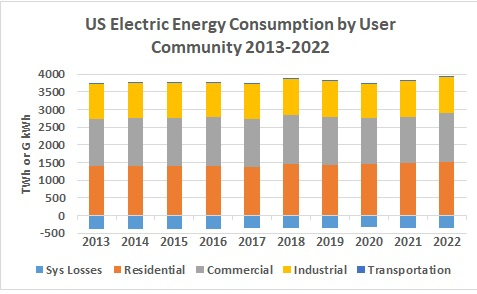
US Electric Energy Consumption by User Community 2013–2022

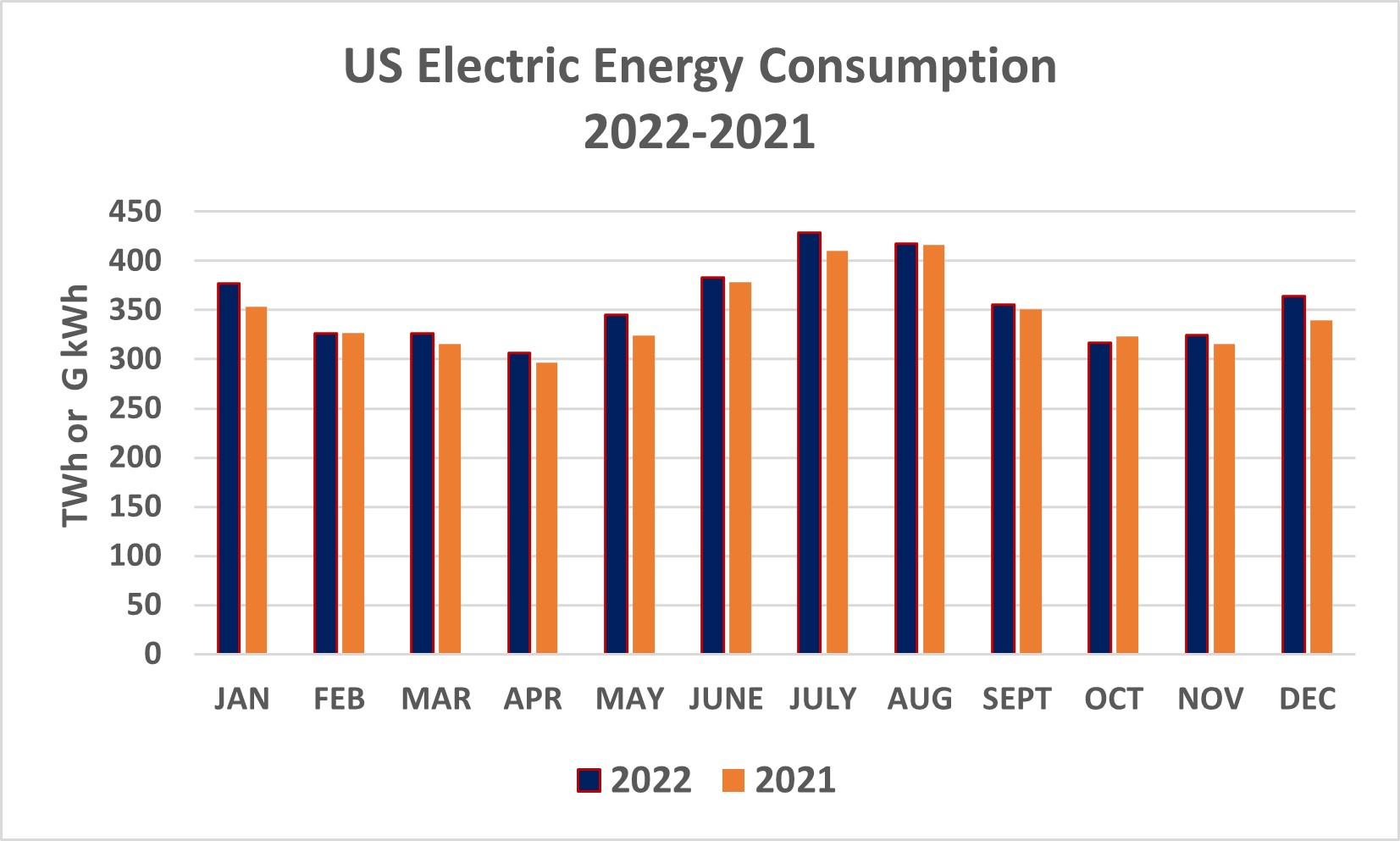
US Electric Energy Profile 2022–2021
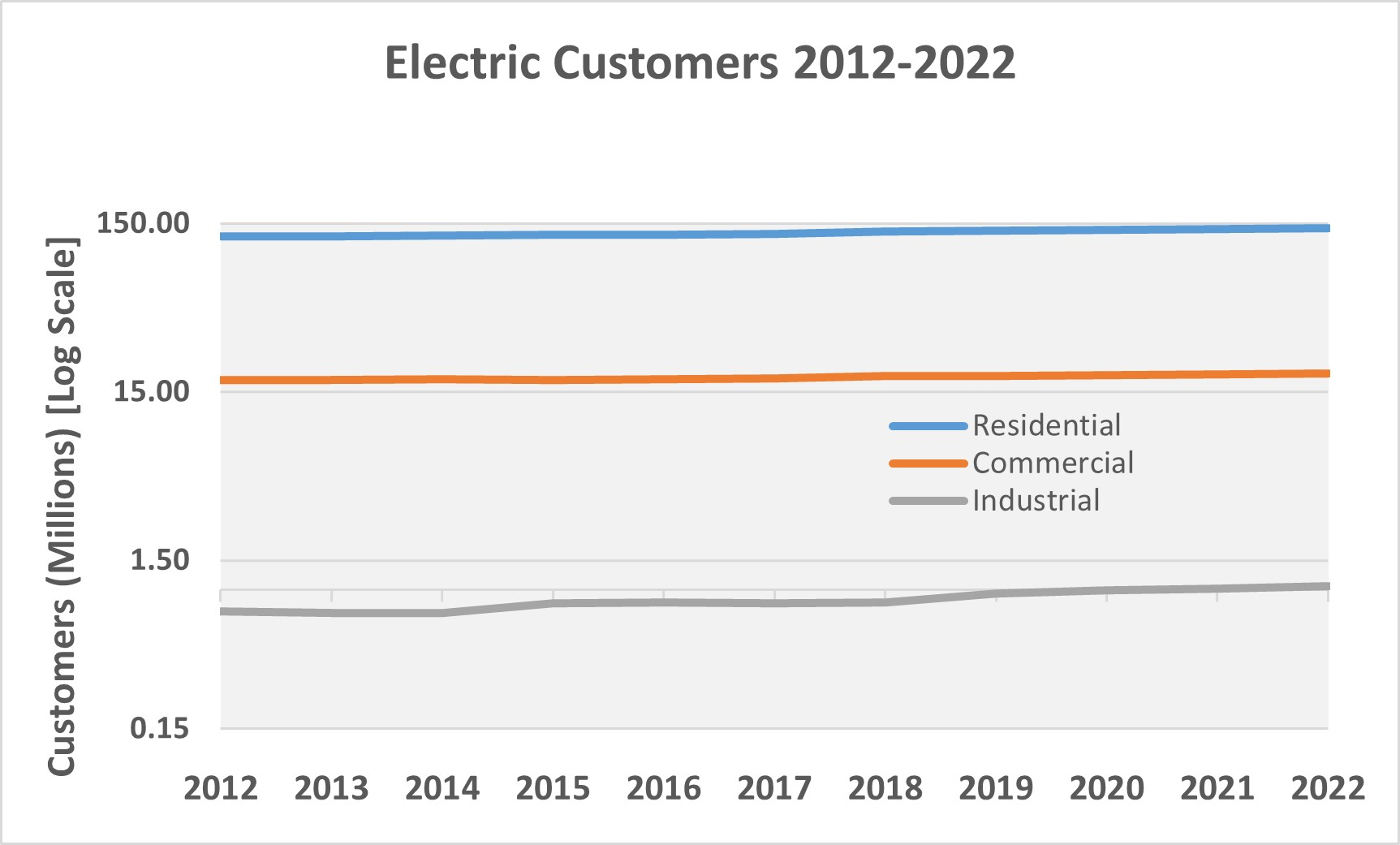
US Electric Customers 2012–2022

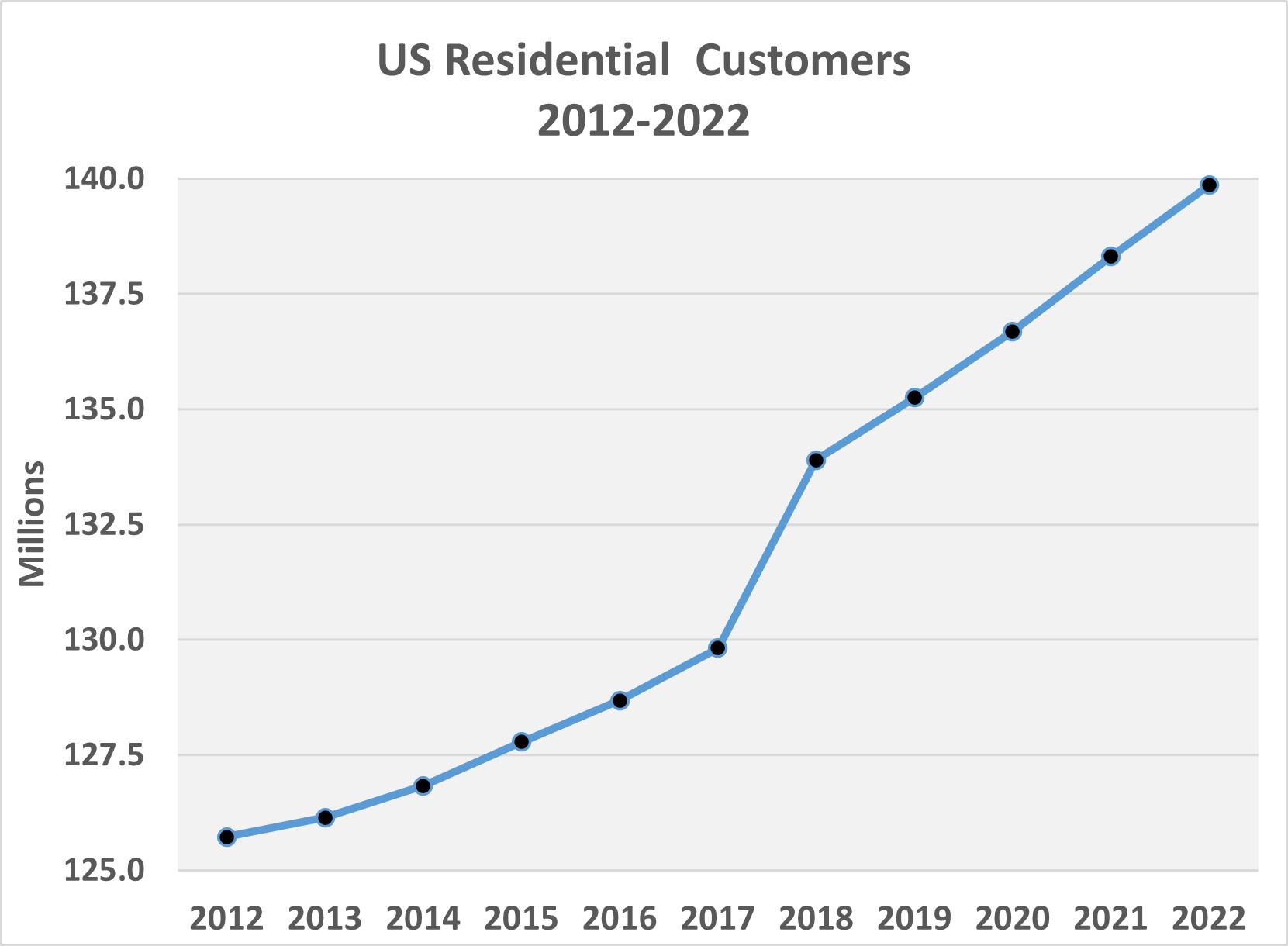
US Residential Customers 2022

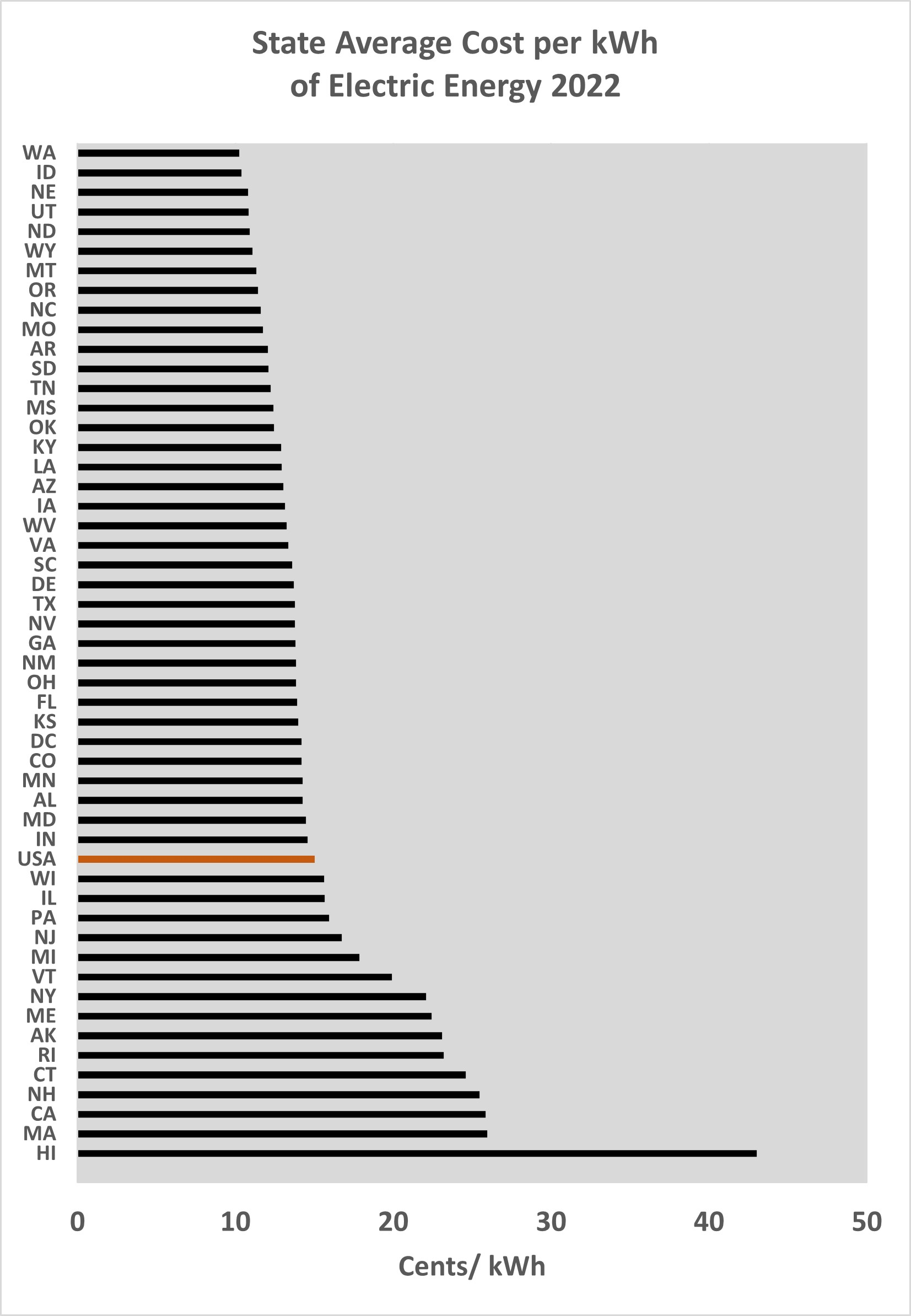
kWh Electric Costs (Cents/kWh) by State

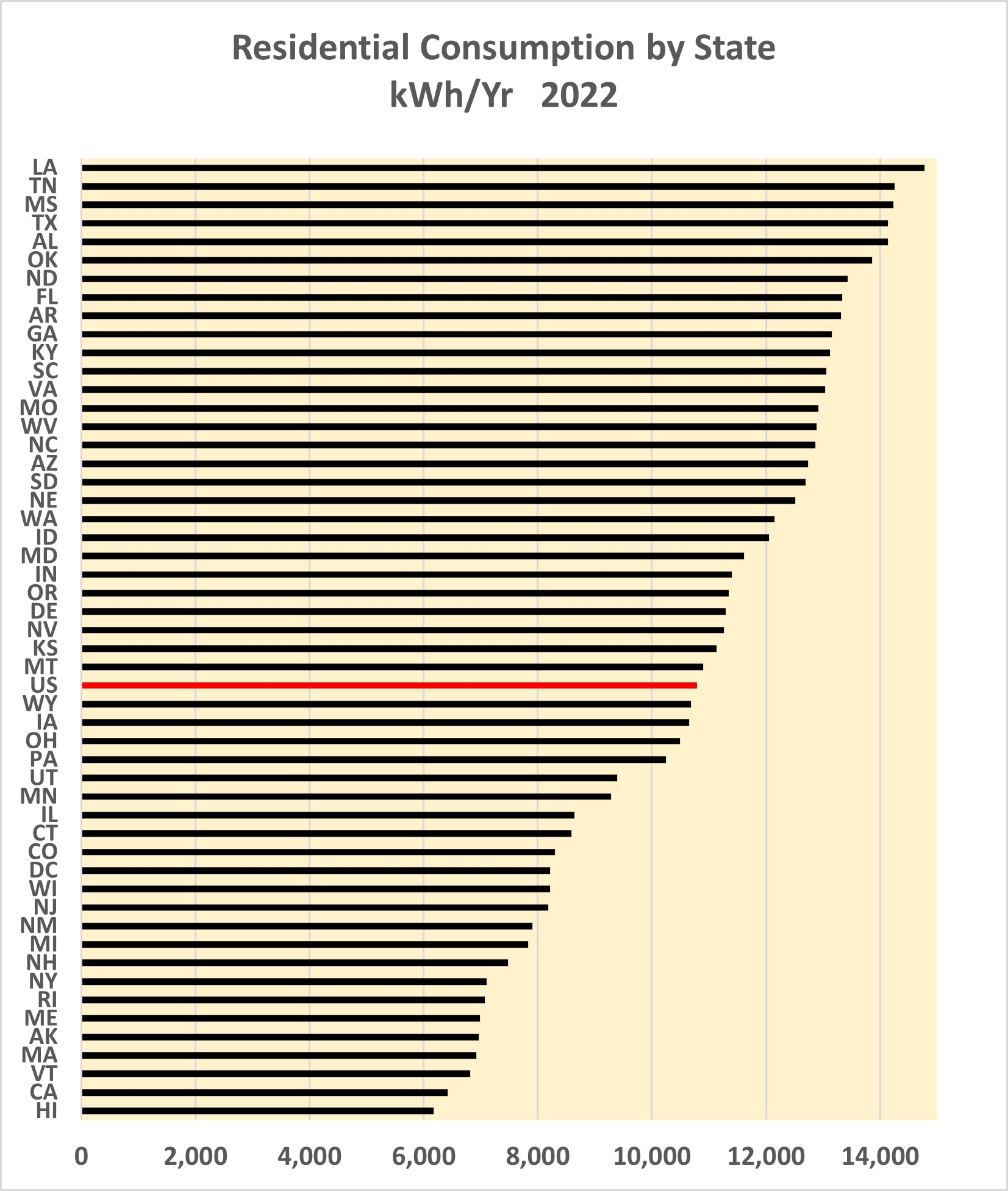
Average Residential Electric Energy Consumption by State 2022

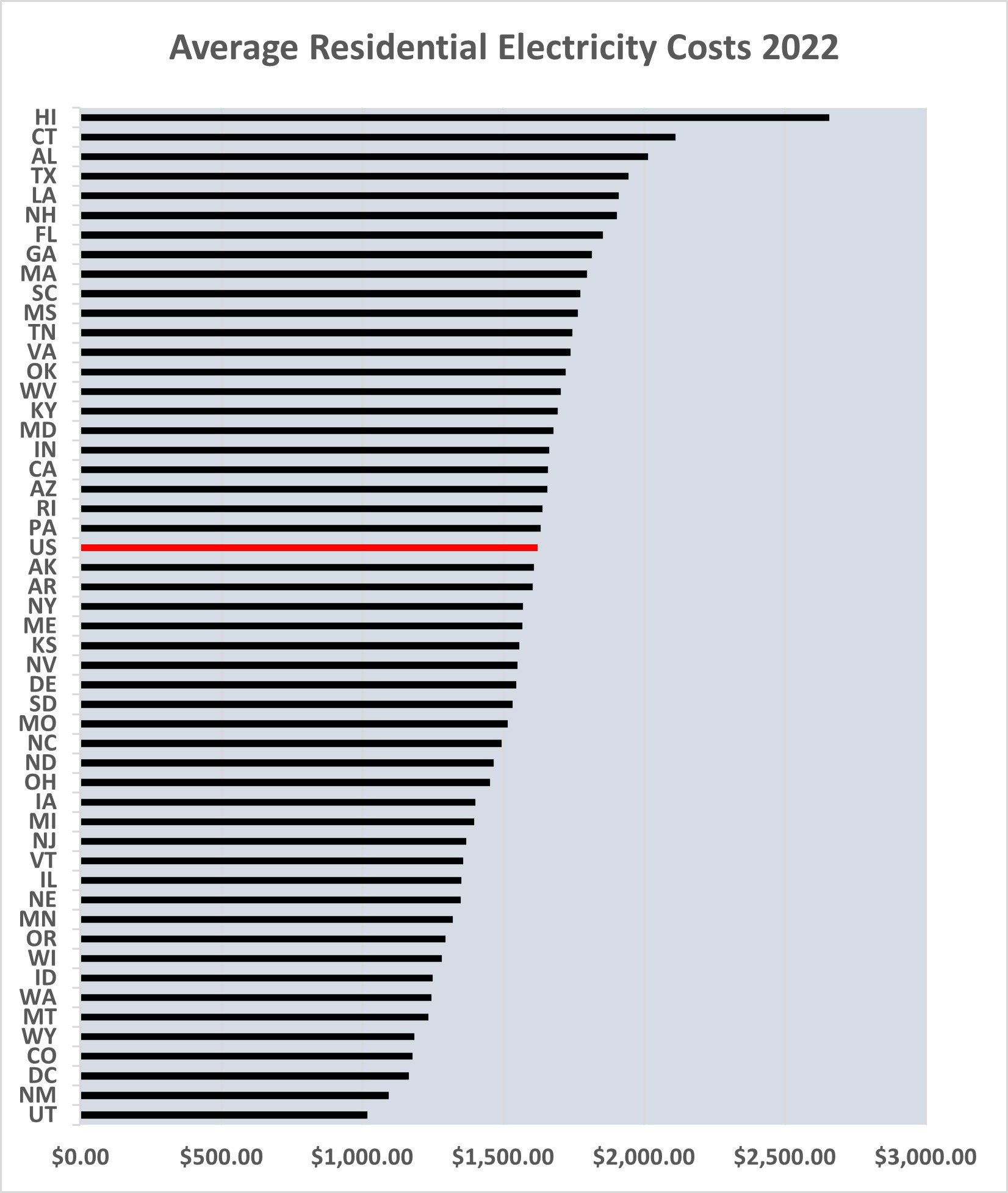
State Average Residential Electricity Cost in 2022

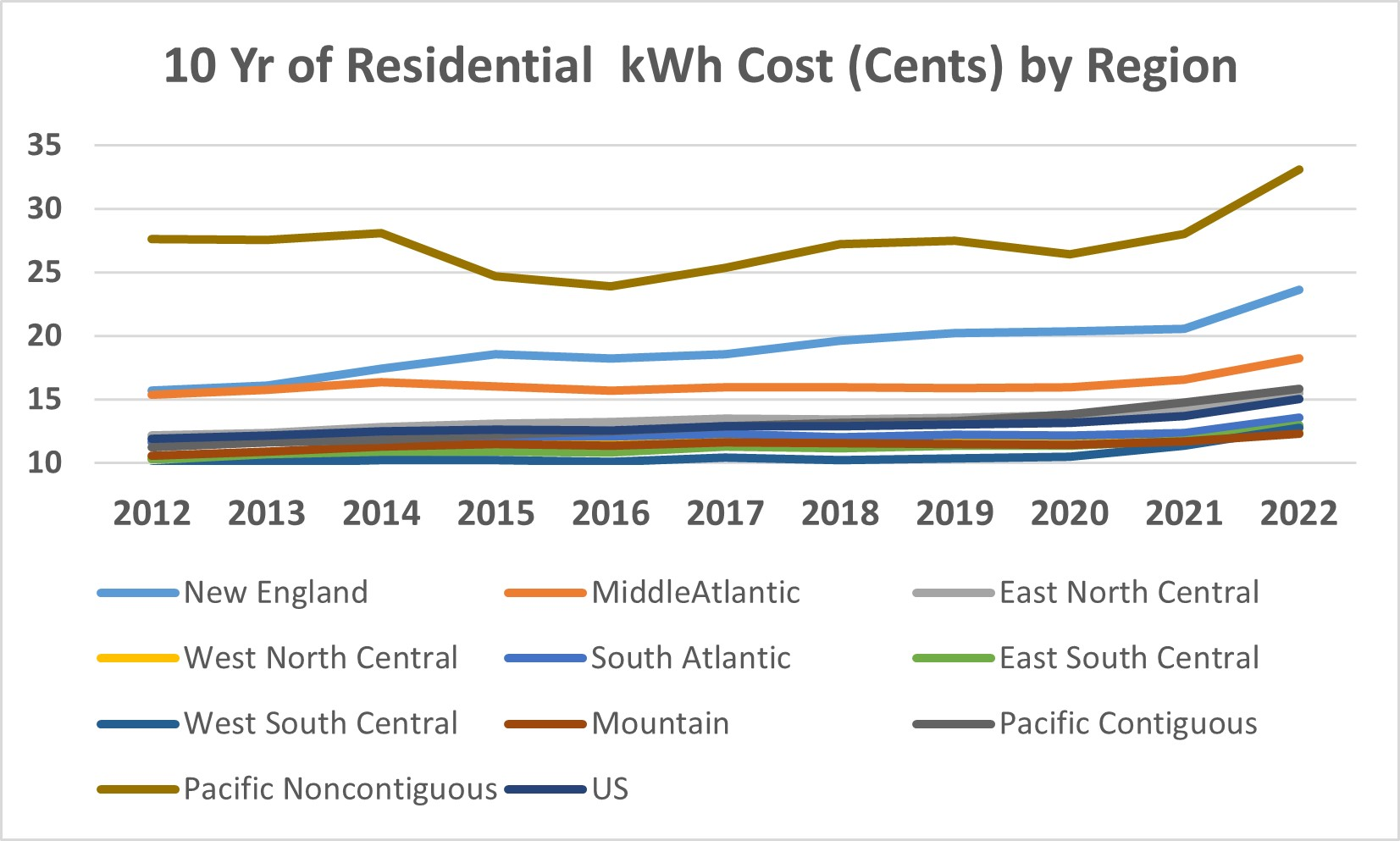
10 Yr Average Residential kWh costs by Region

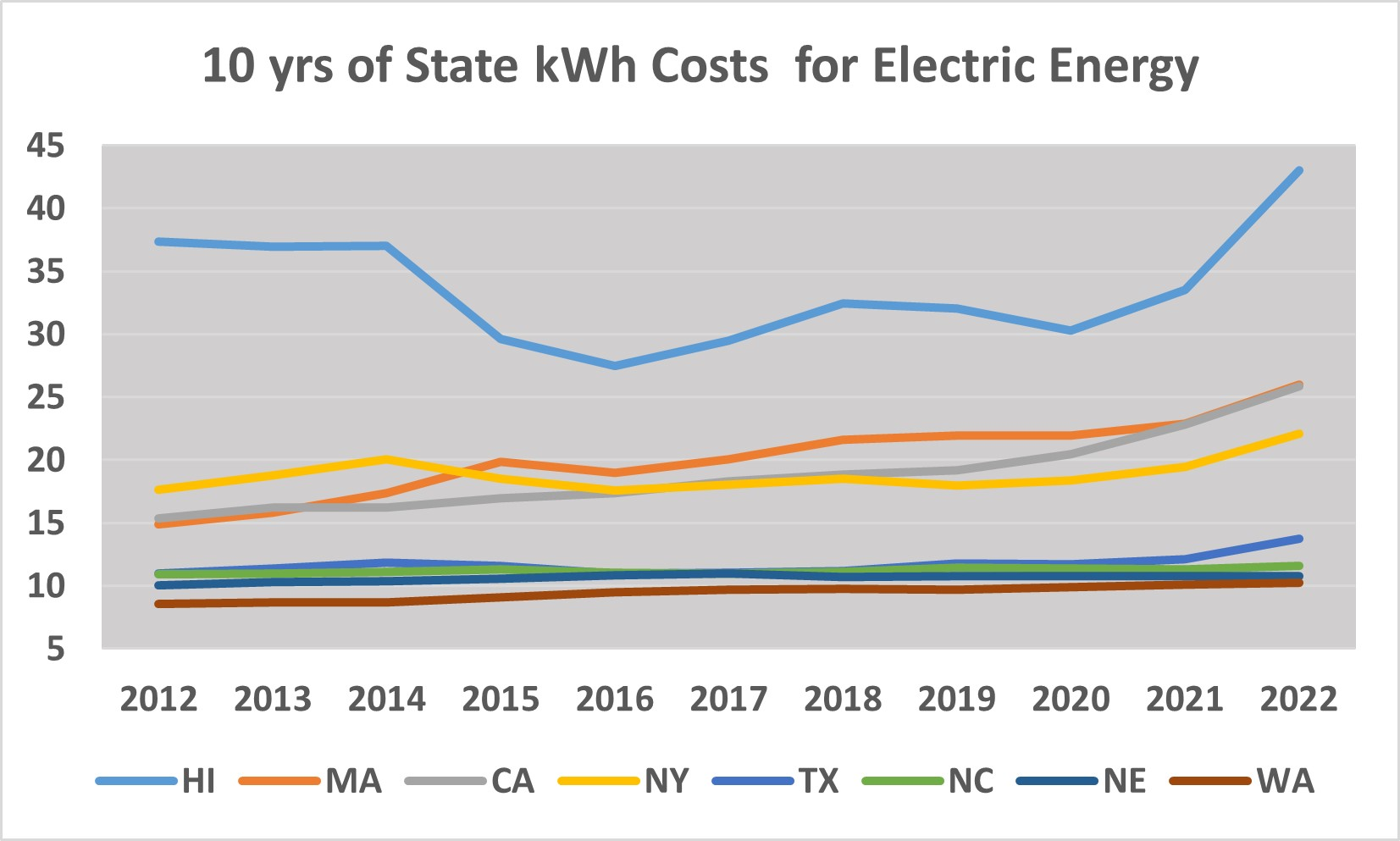
10 Yr Average Residential kWh costs for Several States

=== Consumption per person ===
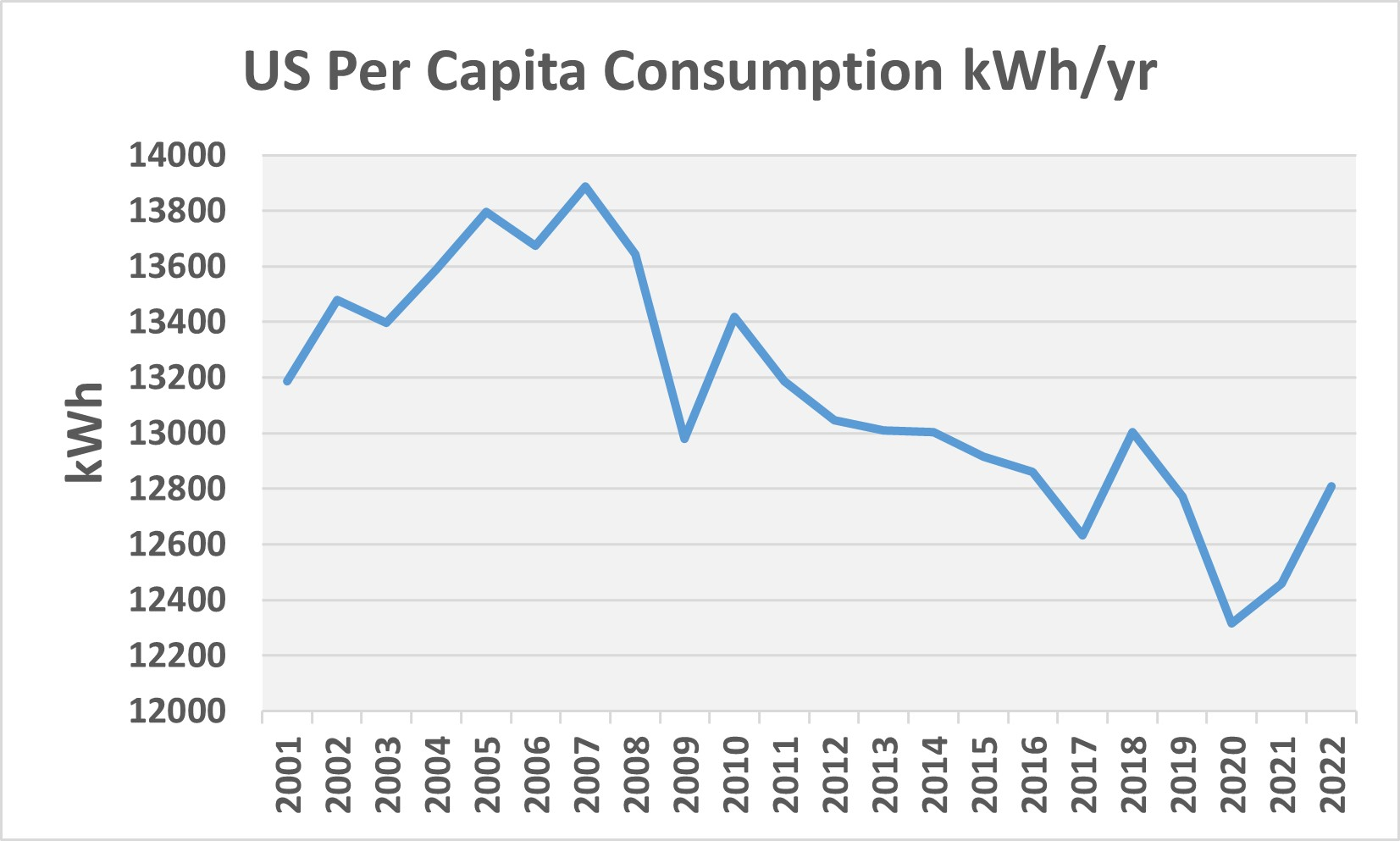
US per Capita Consumption kWh/yr

Electricity consumption per person (per capita) is based upon data mined from US DOE Energy Information Administration/Electric Power Annual 2022 files Population data is from Demographics of the United States. Per capita consumption in 2022 is 12,809 kWh. This is up 351 kWh from 2021 and down 1.8% from a decade ago and down 7.2% from its peak in 2007. The following table shows the yearly US per capita consumption by fuel source from 1999 to 2022.

The following table used the first column from the Demographics of the United States#Vital statistics table for population, and generation from Electric Power Annual. Technically this means that "consumption" includes transmission losses, etc., because the values in the table were all calculated from table ES1. Summary Statistics for the United States. Also since 2016 the small scale solar estimate is included in the solar contribution.

Yearly US Per Capita Consumption (kWh) by Fuel Source 1999–2022
Year	Population million	Fossil Fuel				Nuclear	Renewable							Misc	Total
Year	Population million	Coal	Oil	Gas	Subtotal	Nuclear	Hydro	Geo	Solar	Wind	Wood	Other Bio	Subtotal	Misc	Total
2022	338.290	2,458	68	5,022	7,547	2,281	753	48	606	1284	105	48	2,663	137	12,809
2021	336.998	2,665	57	4,720	7,442	2,314	747	47	488	1122	108	53	2,419	138	12,458
2020	331.449	2,333	52	4,936	7,322	2,383	861	48	352	1020	109	56	2,362	165	12,316
2019	328.240	2,943	57	4,861	7,861	2,466	834	49	327	914	121	57	2,302	143	12,772
2018	326.980	3,515	77	4,534	8,126	2,468	895	49	285	834	125	64	2,162	158	13,004
2017	325.719	3,702	66	4,018	7,786	2,471	922	49	237	781	126	66	2,108	193	12,632
2016	323.128	3,835	75	4,305	8,215	2,493	829	49	170	702	127	68	1,886	209	12,861
2015	320.897	4,215	88	4,196	8,499	2,484	776	50	78	594	131	68	1,696	236	12,915
2014	318.857	4,961	95	3,571	8,626	2,500	813	50	55	570	133	68	1,689	190	13,005
2013	316.129	5,001	86	3,599	8,686	2,496	850	50	29	531	127	66	1,651	176	13,010
2012	313.874	4,824	74	3,944	8,841	2,451	880	50	14	449	120	63	1,576	179	13,047
2011	313.85	5,523	96	3,267	8,886	2,518	1,018	49	6	383	119	61	1,636	147	13,187
2010	309.33	5,972	120	3,230	9,321	2,609	841	49	3.9	306	120	61	1,382	108	13,419
2009	307.01	5,719	127	3,034	8,881	2,602	891	49	2.9	241	117	60	1,361	135	12,978
2008	304.38	6,524	152	2,939	9,616	2,649	837	49	2.8	182	123	58	1,252	126	13,642
2007	301.58	6,686	218	3,018	9,922	2,674	821	49	2.0	114	129	55	1,170	121	13,887
2006	298.59	6,666	215	2,782	9,663	2,636	969	49	1.7	89	130	54	1,292	83	13,675
2005	295.75	6,806	413	2,618	9,838	2,644	914	50	1.9	60	131	52	1,209	105	13,796
2004	293.05	6,751	413	2,475	9,639	2,691	916	51	2.0	48	130	53	1,199	58	13,588
2003	290.33	6,798	411	2,292	9,502	2,631	950	50	1.8	39	129	54	1,224	41	13,397
2002	287.80	6,717	329	2,441	9,486	2,710	918	50	1.9	36	134	52	1,193	90	13,479
2001	285.08	6,679	438	2,274	9,390	2,697	761	48	1.9	24	123	51	1,009	88	13,185
2000	282.17	6,968	394	2,179	9,542	2,672	977	50	1.7	20	133	82	1,263	117	13,594
1999	279.04	6,741	423	2,045	9,209	2,610	1,145	53	1.8	16	133	81	1,430	96	13,345

- Gas includes natural gas and other gases.
- Solar includes photovoltaics and thermal and includes small scale solar.
- Misc includes misc generation, pumped storage, and net imports.
- Bio Other includes waste, landfill gas, and other.
- Hydro excludes pumped storage (not an energy source, used by all sources, other than hydro).
- Total includes net imports and calculated small scale solar (since 2016)

=== Grid storage ===
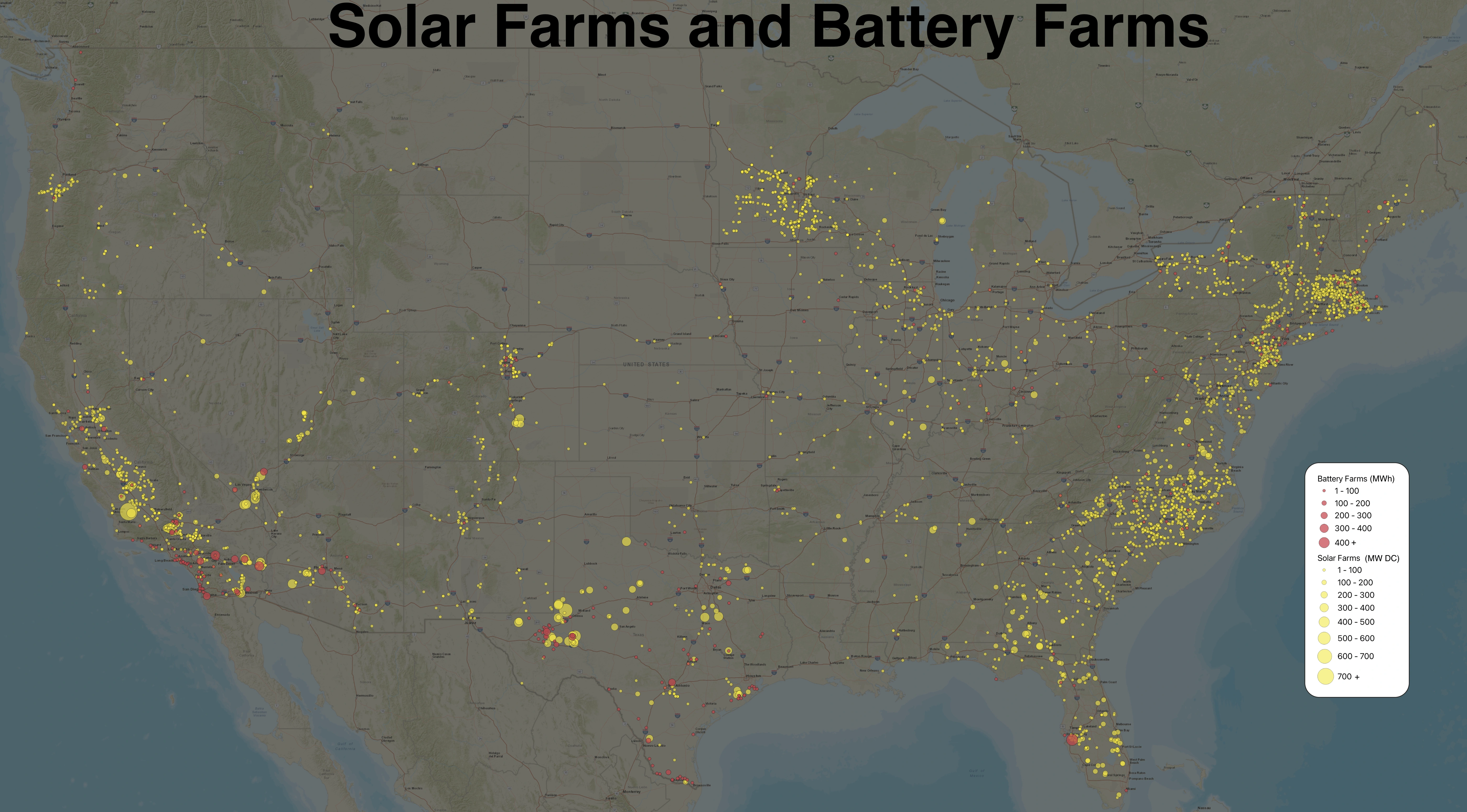
Solar farms and battery farms in the United States

USA has 21.9 GW of pumped-storage hydroelectricity and 6.6 GW of grid batteries as of 2022. They are around 80% efficient (20% loss), so they are net consumers of electricity. Pumped storage generated around 1 TWh/month in winter, and around 2.5 TWh/month in summer as of 2021.

== Responsibilities in the electricity sector ==
The fragility and reliability of the electrical grid is a major public policy concern. This 2019 assessment reiterates concerns "that a prolonged collapse of this nation's electrical grid—through starvation, disease, and societal collapse—could result in the death of up to 90% of the American population".

=== Policy and regulation ===
Policy for the electricity sector in the United States is set by the executive and legislative bodies of the federal government and state governments. Within the executive branch of the federal government the Department of Energy plays a key role. In addition, the Environmental Protection Agency is in charge of environmental regulation and the Federal Trade Commission is in charge of consumer protection and the prevention of anti-competitive practices.

Key federal legislation related to the electricity sector includes:

- the Federal Power Act of 1935 that promoted hydropower and increased the role of the federal government in the sector,
- the National Energy Act of 1978, including the Public Utility Regulatory Policies Act (PURPA), which required utilities to provide residential consumers with energy conservation audits and other services to encourage slower growth of electricity demand, and was intended to promote renewable energy with the result of promoting mainly co-generation;
- the Energy Policy Act of 1992 which provided further incentives for energy efficiency and removed obstacles to wholesale competition; and
- the Energy Independence and Security Act of 2007 which phased out incandescent light bulbs.

Many state governments have been active in promoting renewable energy. For example, in 2007 25 states and the District of Columbia had established renewable portfolio standards (RPS). There is no federal policy on RPS.

The Federal Energy Regulatory Commission is in charge of regulating interstate electricity sales, wholesale electric rates, and licensing hydropower plants. Rates for electricity distribution are regulated by state-level Public Utilities Commissions or Public Services Commissions.

=== Deregulation and competition ===
Deregulation of the electricity sector consists in the introduction of competition and the unbundling of vertically integrated utilities in separate entities in charge of electricity generation, electricity transmission, electricity distribution and commercialization. The deregulation of the electricity sector in the U.S. began with the Energy Policy Act of 1992 which removed obstacles for wholesale competition. In practice, however, regulation has been unevenly introduced between states. It began in earnest only from 1996 onwards when the Federal Energy Regulatory Commission issued orders that required utilities to provide transmission services "on a reasonable and non-discriminatory basis". In some states, such as in California, private utilities were required to sell some of their power plants to prevent concentration of market power.

As of April 2014, 16 U.S. states – Connecticut, Delaware, Illinois, Maine, Maryland, Massachusetts, Michigan, Montana, New Hampshire, New Jersey, New York, Ohio, Oregon, Pennsylvania, Rhode Island, and Texas – and the District of Columbia have deregulated their electricity markets in some capacity. Additionally, seven states – Arizona, Arkansas, California, Nevada, New Mexico, Virginia, and Wyoming – started electricity deregulation in some capacity but have since suspended deregulation. The deregulation of the Texas electricity market in 2002 is one of the better-known examples. The result has been that the different states with in United States have a wide spectrum of different levels of deregulation. Some states only allow large commercial customers to choose a different supplier, some allow all consumers to choose. Contrary to the largely similar methods of deregulation for natural gas, different states have taken very different approaches to electricity deregulation.

=== Service provision ===
Electric utilities in the U.S. can be both in charge of electricity generation and electricity distribution. The electricity transmission network is not owned by individual utilities, but by companies and organizations that are obliged to provide indiscriminate access to various suppliers to promote competition. In 1996, there were 3,195 electric utilities in the United States and 65 power marketers. Of these, 2,020 were publicly owned (including 10 Federal utilities), 932 were rural electric cooperatives, and 243 were investor-owned utilities. Fewer than 1,000 utilities are engaged in power generation.

==== Generation ====
About 80% of the electricity in the U.S. is generated by private ("investor-owned") utilities. The remaining electricity is produced by the public sector. This includes federal agencies such as the Tennessee Valley Authority (producing mainly nuclear and hydropower), and Power Marketing Administrations of the Department of Energy, one of which is the Bonneville Power Administration (in the Pacific Northwest)(hydropower). It also includes municipal utilities and utility cooperatives.

The largest private electric producers in the United States include:

- AES Corporation
- Southern Company, 42 GW
- American Electric Power, 38 GW
- Duke Energy, 58.2 GW
- Luminant, 18 GW
- Reliant Energy, 14 GW
- Pacific Gas and Electric Company, 7.7 GW
- Vistra, 41 GW

==== Transmission ====
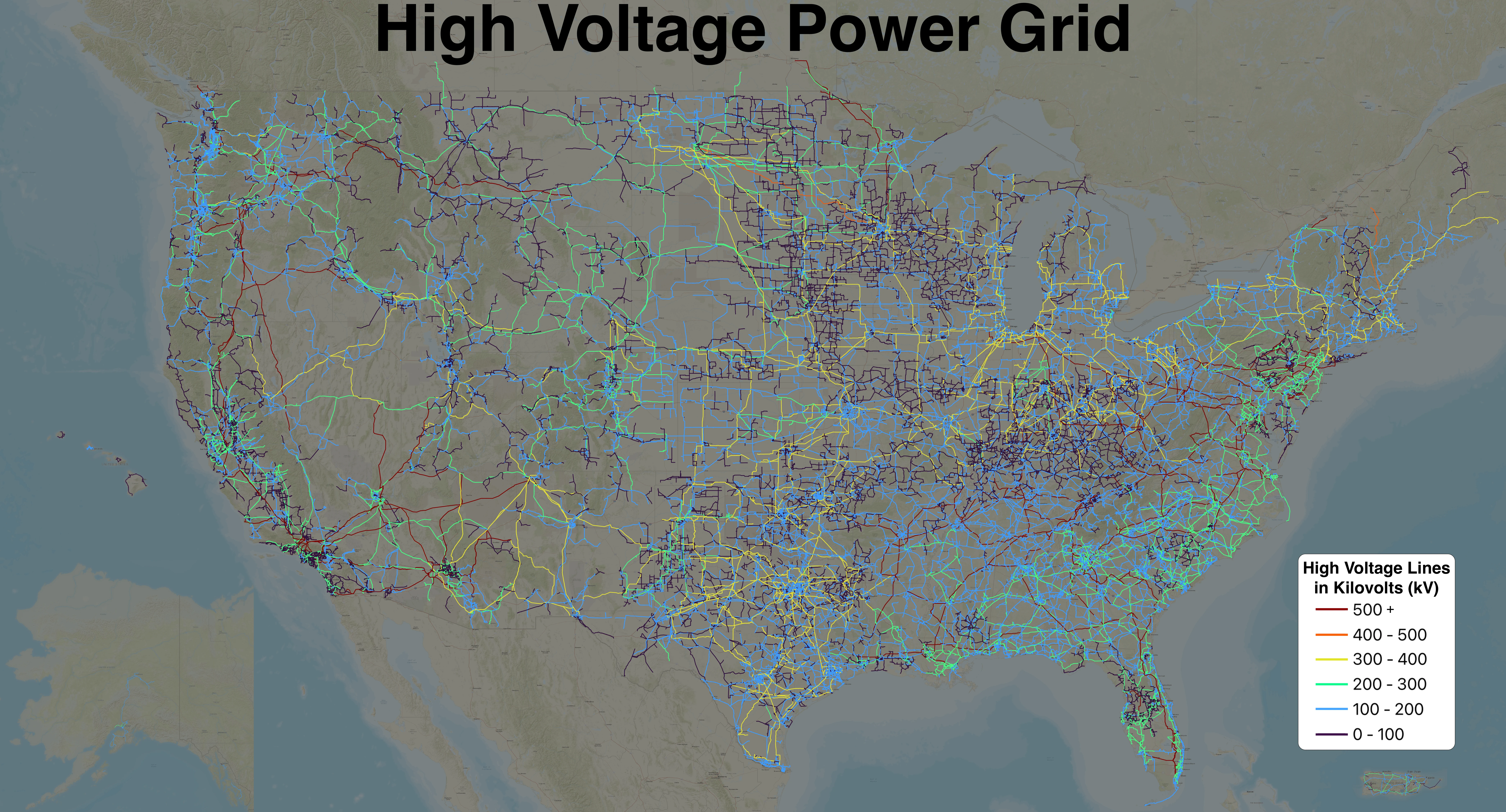
High voltage power grid in kilovolts (kV) 500+ 400–500 300–400 200–300 100–200 <100

There are two major wide area synchronous grids in North America, the Eastern Interconnection and the Western Interconnection. Besides this there are two minor power grids in the U.S., the Alaska Interconnection and the Texas Interconnection. The Eastern, Western and Texas Interconnections are tied together at various points with DC interconnects allowing electrical power to be transmitted throughout the contiguous U.S., parts of Canada and parts of Mexico. The transmission grids are operated by transmission system operators (TSOs), not-for profit companies that are typically owned by the utilities in their respective service area, where they coordinate, control and monitor the operation of the electrical power system. TSOs are obliged to provide non-discriminatory transmission access to electricity generators and customers. TSOs can be of two types: Independent System Operators (ISOs) and Regional Transmission Organizations (RTOs). The former operates within a single state and the latter covers wider areas crossing state borders.

In 2009 there were four RTOs in the U.S.:

- ISO New England (ISO-NE, which is an RTO despite its name);
- Midcontinent Independent System Operator;
- PJM Interconnection in the Mid-Atlantic region; and
- Southwest Power Pool (SPP) covering Oklahoma, Kansas and parts of Arkansas, Missouri, Texas and New Mexico.

There are also three ISOs:

- California Independent System Operator (California ISO);
- New York Independent System Operator (NYISO);
- Electric Reliability Council of Texas (ERCOT, an ISO).

The three major and two minor NERC Interconnections, and the nine NERC Regional Reliability Councils.

RTOs are similar, but not identical to the nine Regional Reliability Councils associated in the North American Electric Reliability Corporation (NERC), a non-profit entity that is in charge of improving the reliability and security of the bulk power system in the U.S., Canada and the northern part of Baja California in Mexico. The members of the Regional Reliability Councils include private, public and cooperative utilities, power marketers and final customers. The Regional Reliability Councils are:

- Eastern Interconnection
  - Florida Reliability Coordinating Council (FRCC)
  - Midwest Reliability Organization (MRO)
  - Northeast Power Coordinating Council (NPCC)
  - ReliabilityFirst Corporation (RFC)
  - SERC Reliability Corporation (SERC)
  - Southwest Power Pool (SPP)
- Western Interconnection
  - Western Electricity Coordinating Council (WECC)
- Texas Interconnection
  - Electric Reliability Council of Texas (ERCOT)

The FERC distinguishes between 10 power markets in the U.S., including the seven for which RTOs have been established, well as:

- Northwest
- Southwest (covering Arizona, most of New Mexico and Colorado)
- Southeast

ISOs and RTOs were established in the 1990s when states and regions established wholesale competition for electricity.

==== Distribution ====
About 75% of electricity sales to final customers are undertaken by private utilities, with the remainder being sold by municipal utilities and cooperatives.

== Economic and financial aspects ==
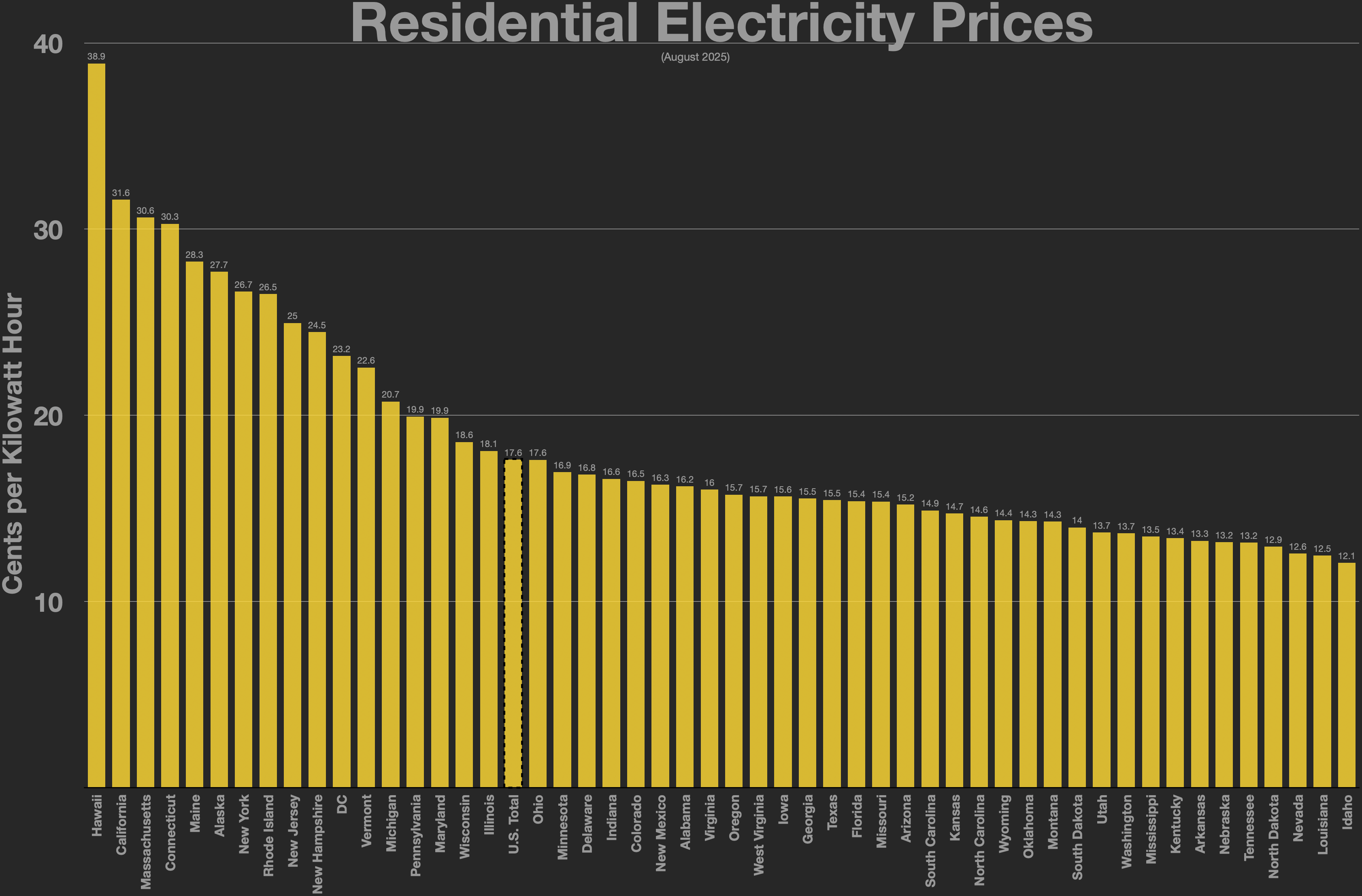
Electricity prices for each State August 2025

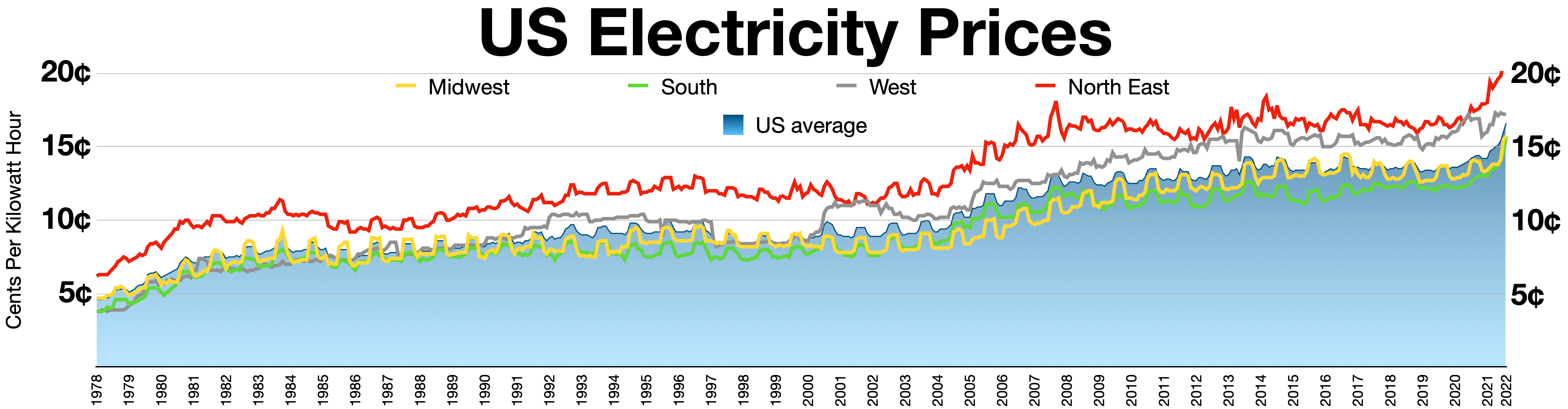
US Electricity Prices US average North East West Midwest South

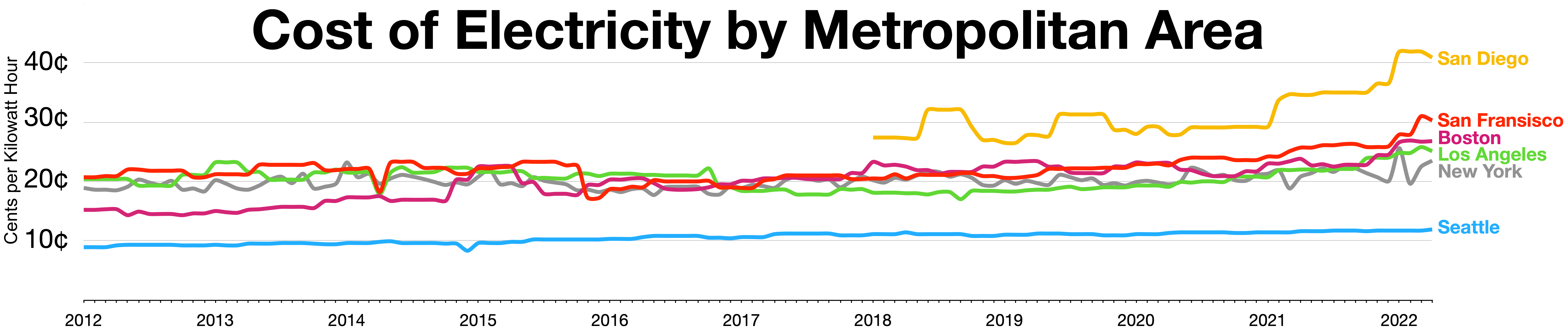
Cost of Electricity by Metropolitan Area San Diego San Francisco Boston Los Angeles New York City Seattle

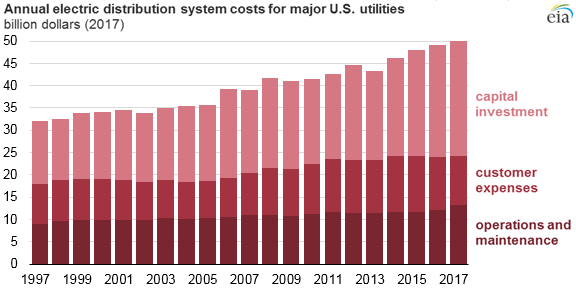
Sources of costs for US electric distribution systems

=== Tariffs and affordability ===
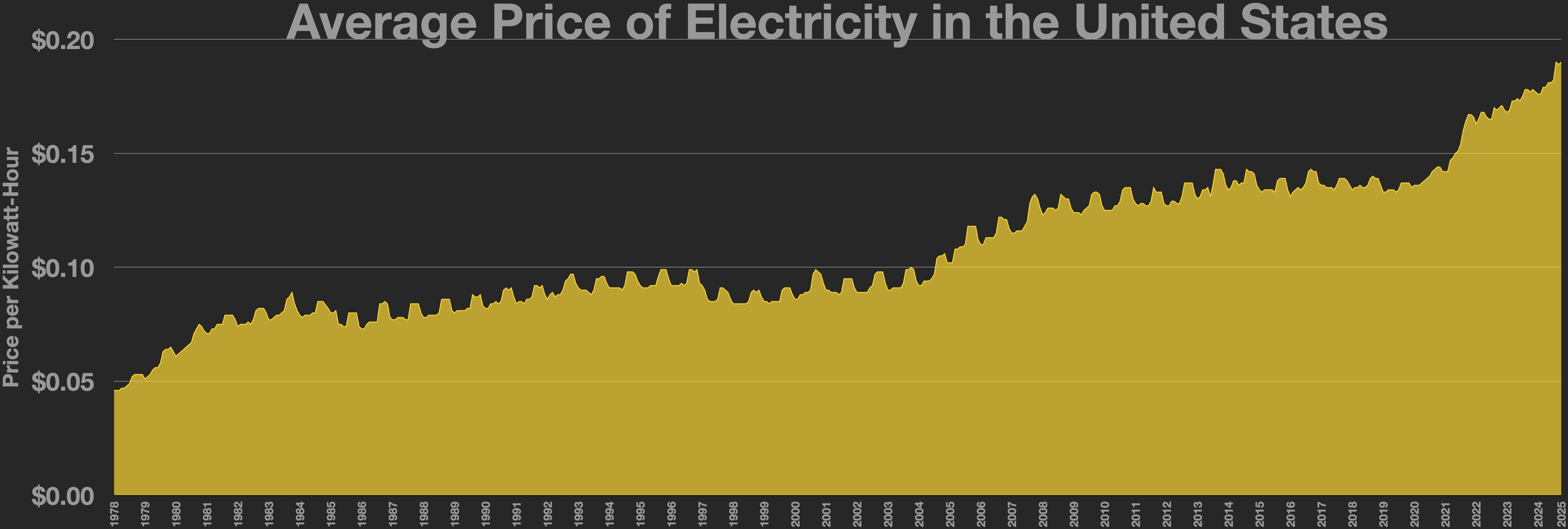
Average price of electricity in the United States

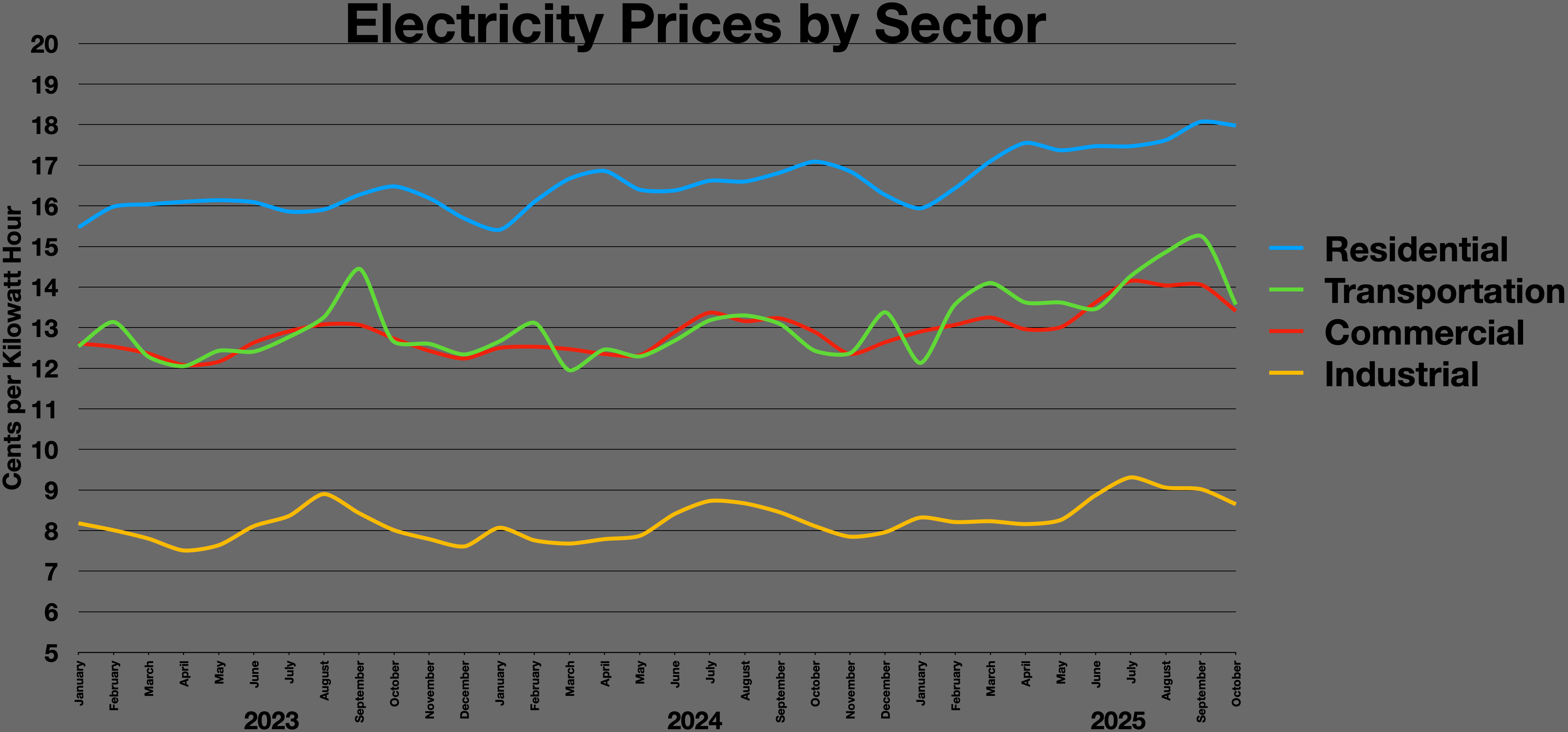
Electricity prices by sector

In 2008 the average electricity tariff in the U.S. was 9.82 ¢/kWh, up from 6.9 ¢/kWh in 1995. Residential tariffs were somewhat higher at 11.36 ¢/kWh, while commercial tariffs stood at 10.28 ¢/kWh and industrial tariffs at 7.01 ¢/kWh. The cost of supplying high-voltage power to high-volume industrial customers is lower than the cost of providing low-voltage (120 V) power to residential and commercial customers.

In 2006–07 commercial electricity tariffs in the U.S. (9.28 ¢/kWh) were higher than in Australia (7.1 ¢/kWh), Canada (6.18 ¢/kWh) that relies mainly on hydropower or in France (8.54 ¢/kWh) that relies heavily on nuclear power, but lower than in Germany (13.16 ¢/kWh), Italy (15.74 ¢/kWh) or the UK (11.16 ¢/kWh) that all rely to a larger degree on fossil fuels, all compared at purchasing power parity.

Residential tariffs vary significantly between states from 6.7 ¢/kWh in West Virginia to 24.1 ¢/kWh in Hawaii. An important factor that influences tariff levels is the mix of energy sources used in power generation. For example, access to cheap federal power from hydropower plants contributes to low electricity tariffs in some states.

Average residential electricity consumption in the U.S. was 936 kWh/month per in 2007, and the average bill was US$100/month. Average residential consumption varies considerably between states from 530 kWh/month in Maine to 1,344 kWh/month in Tennessee. Factors that influence residential energy consumption are climate, tariffs and efforts to promote energy conservation.

=== Revenues ===
Total revenue from the sale of electricity in 2008 was US$344bn, including US$148bn from residential customers, US$129bn from commercial customers and US$66bn from industrial customers. Many large industries self-generate electricity and their electricity consumption thus is not included in these figures.

=== Financing ===
Most investments in the U.S. electricity sector are financed by private companies through debt and equity. However, some investments are indirectly financed by taxpayers through various subsidies.

=== Subsidies and tax incentives ===
There is a large array of subsidies in the U.S. electricity sector ranging from various forms of tax incentives to subsidies for research and development, feed-in tariffs for renewable energy and support to low-income households to pay their electric bills. Some subsidies are available throughout the U.S., while others are only available in some states.

Tax incentives include federal and state tax deductions and tax breaks. Tax incentives can be directed at consumers, such as for the purchase of energy-efficient appliances or for solar energy systems, small wind systems, geothermal heat pumps, and residential fuel cell and microturbine systems. Tax incentives can also be directed at electricity producers, in particular for renewable energy.

The Low Income Home Energy Assistance Program (LIHEAP) received federal funding of $5.1 billion in Fiscal Year 2009. It is funded mainly by the federal government through the U.S. Department of Health and Human Services, Administration for Children and Families, and is administered by states and territories. While some of its funding is for fuel for heating, some is also used to cover electricity bills for both heating and cooling.

In April 2009, 11 U.S. state legislatures were considering adopting feed-in tariffs as a complement to their renewable electricity mandates.

== See also ==
- Energy in the United States
- Energy policy of the United States
- 2000–01 California electricity crisis
- Northeast blackout of 2003
- Energy Information Administration
- List of largest power stations in the United States
- List of U.S. states by electricity production
- List of U.S. states by electricity production from renewable sources
