= North American power transmission grid =

Series of electrical grids that power the US and Canada

The two major and three minor North American Electric Reliability Corporation (NERC) interconnections, and the nine NERC Regional Reliability Councils.

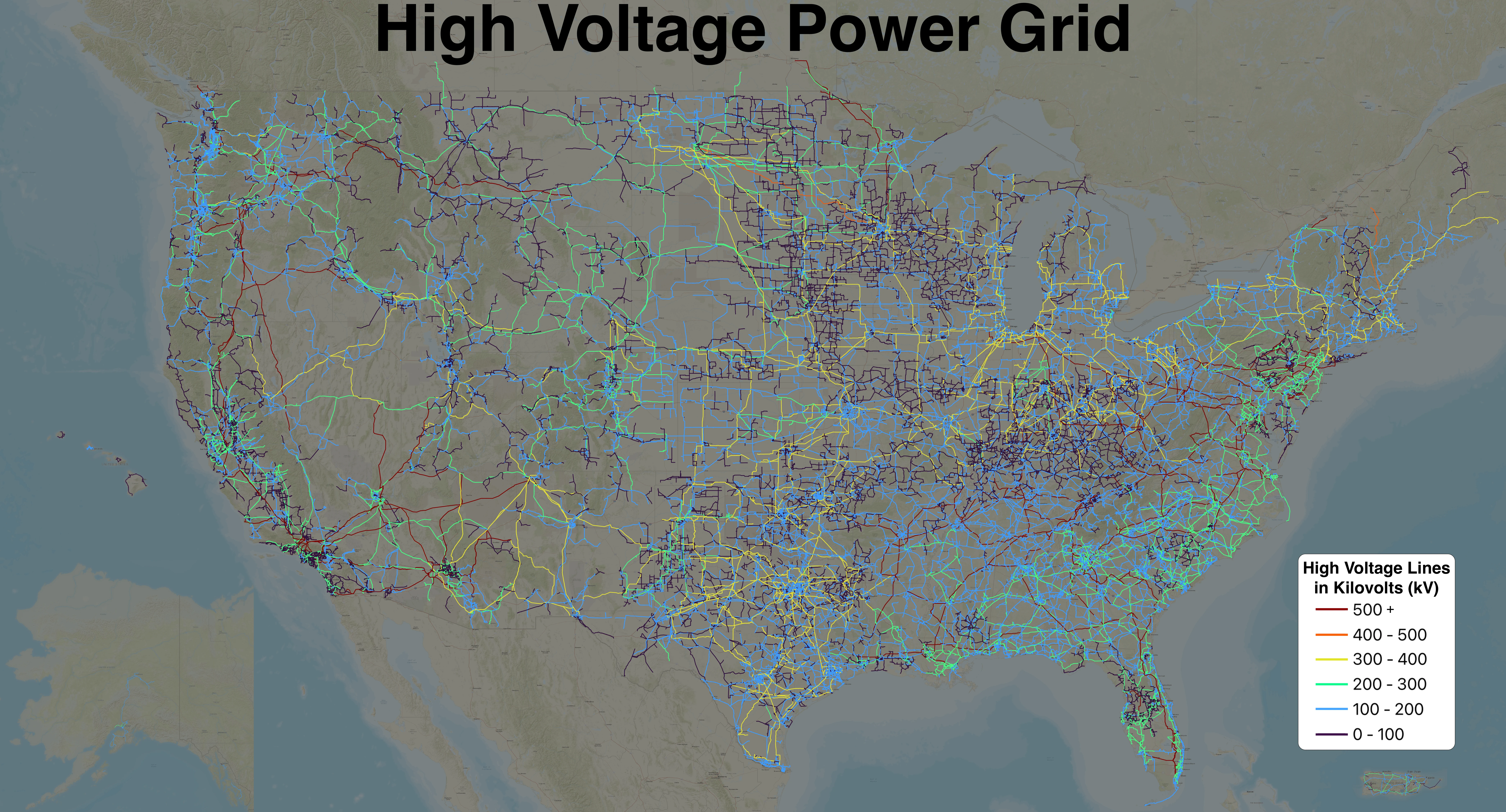
High voltage power grid in kilovolts (kV) 500+ 400-500 300-400 200-300 100-200 <100

The electrical power grid that powers Northern America is not a single grid, but is instead divided into multiple wide area synchronous grids. The Eastern Interconnection and the Western Interconnection are the largest. Three other regions include the Texas Interconnection, the Quebec Interconnection, and the Alaska Interconnection. Each region delivers power at a nominal 60 Hz frequency.

The regions are not usually directly connected or synchronized to each other, but there exist some HVDC interconnectors. The Eastern and Western grids are connected via seven links that allow 1.32 GW to flow between them. A study by the National Renewable Energy Laboratory found that increasing these interconnections would save energy costs.

== History ==
In the United States in the 1920s, utilities formed joint operations to share peak load coverage and backup power. In 1934, with the passage of the Public Utility Holding Company Act, electric utilities were recognized as public goods of importance and were given outlined restrictions and regulatory oversight of their operations.

From 1967, the East and West interconnections were directly connected together. The AC ties did not have high capacity and were subject to oscillations, and so their connection proved unreliable. In 1975 the AC ties were disconnected, because DC ties were found to work more reliably.

The Energy Policy Act of 1992 required transmission line owners to allow electric generation companies open access to their network and led to a restructuring of how the electric industry operated in an effort to create competition in power generation. No longer were electric utilities built as vertical monopolies, where generation, transmission and distribution were handled by a single company. Now, the three stages could be split among various companies in an effort to provide fair accessibility to high voltage transmission. The Energy Policy Act of 2005 allowed incentives and loan guarantees for alternative energy production and to advance innovative technologies that avoided greenhouse emissions.

== Description ==
There are two major wide area synchronous grids in North America: the Eastern Interconnection and the Western Interconnection. There are three minor power grids in North America: the Alaska Interconnection, the Texas Interconnection, and the Quebec Interconnection. The Eastern, Western, Texas, and Quebec Interconnections are tied together at various points with DC interconnects allowing electrical power to be transmitted throughout the contiguous U.S., Canada and parts of Mexico.

The transmission grids are operated by transmission system operators (TSOs), not-for profit companies that are typically owned by the utilities in their respective service areas, where they coordinate, control and monitor the operation of the electrical power system. TSOs are obliged to provide nondiscriminatory transmission access to electricity generators and customers. TSOs can be of two types: Independent System Operators (ISOs) and Regional Transmission Organizations (RTOs). ISOs operate within a single state. RTOs cover wider areas, crossing state borders.

In 2009 there were four RTOs in the U.S.:

- ISO New England (ISO-NE, which is an RTO despite its name);
- Midcontinent Independent System Operator (MISO);
- PJM Interconnection in the Mid-Atlantic region; and
- Southwest Power Pool (SPP) covering Oklahoma, Kansas and parts of Arkansas, Missouri, Texas and New Mexico.

There are three ISOs:

- California Independent System Operator (California ISO);
- New York Independent System Operator (NYISO);
- Electric Reliability Council of Texas (ERCOT, an ISO).

RTOs are similar but not identical to the nine Regional Reliability Councils associated in the North American Electric Reliability Corporation (NERC), a nonprofit entity that is in charge of improving the reliability and security of the bulk power system in the U.S., Canada and the northern part of Baja California in Mexico. The members of the Regional Reliability Councils include private, public and cooperative utilities, power marketers and final customers.

The Regional Reliability Councils are:

- Eastern Interconnection
  - Florida Reliability Coordinating Council (FRCC)
  - Midwest Reliability Organization (MRO)
  - Northeast Power Coordinating Council (NPCC)
  - ReliabilityFirst Corporation (RFC)
  - SERC Reliability Corporation (SERC)
  - Southwest Power Pool (SPP)
- Western Interconnection
  - Western Electricity Coordinating Council (WECC)
- Texas Interconnection
  - Electric Reliability Council of Texas (ERCOT)

The FERC distinguishes between 10 power markets in the U.S., including the seven for which RTOs have been established, as well as:

- Northwest
- Southwest (covering Arizona, most of New Mexico and Colorado)
- Southeast

ISOs and RTOs were established in the 1990s, when states and regions established wholesale competition for electricity.

== North American Electric Reliability Corporation ==
The North American Electric Reliability Corporation (NERC) is a nonprofit corporation based in Atlanta, Georgia, and formed on March 28, 2006, as the successor to the National Electric Reliability Council (also known as NERC), which formed in the wake of the first large-scale blackout in November of 1965. The original NERC was formed on June 1, 1968, by the electric utility industry to promote the reliability and adequacy of bulk power transmission in the electric utility systems of North America. NERC's mission is to "ensure the reliability of the North American bulk power system."

NERC oversees eight regional reliability entities and encompasses all of the interconnected power systems of the contiguous United States, Canada and a portion of Baja California in Mexico.

NERC's major responsibilities include working with all stakeholders to develop standards for power system operation, monitoring and enforcing compliance with those standards, assessing resource adequacy, and providing educational and training resources as part of an accreditation program to ensure power system operators remain qualified and proficient. NERC also investigates and analyzes the causes of significant power system disturbances in order to help prevent future events.

== Interconnections ==
=== Eastern Interconnection ===
The Eastern Interconnection is one of the two major alternating-current (AC) electrical grids in North America.

All of the electric utilities in the Eastern Interconnection are electrically tied together during normal system conditions and operate at a synchronized frequency operating at an average of 60 Hz. The Eastern Interconnection reaches from Saskatchewan eastward to the Atlantic coast, excluding Quebec, south to Florida, and back west to the foot of the Rockies, excluding most of Texas. The USA part has 700 GW of generating capacity.

Interconnections can be tied to each other via high-voltage direct current power transmission lines (DC ties), or with variable-frequency transformers (VFTs), which permit a controlled flow of energy while also functionally isolating the independent AC frequencies of each side. The Eastern Interconnection is tied to the Western Interconnection with seven DC ties (ca. 200 MW each) in the US and one in Canada, to the Texas Interconnection with two DC ties, and to the Quebec Interconnection with four DC ties and a VFT.

In 2009, the Tres Amigas SuperStation was planned to connect the Eastern, Western and Texas Interconnections via three 5 GW superconductor links. As of 2021 no progress has occurred.

=== Western Interconnection ===
The Western Interconnection is the other major alternating current (AC) power grid in North America.

All of the electric utilities in the Western Interconnection are electrically tied together during normal system conditions and operate at a synchronized frequency of 60 Hz. The Western Interconnection stretches from Western Canada south to Baja California in Mexico, reaching eastward over the Rockies to the Great Plains. The USA part has 250 GW of generating capacity.

Interconnections can be tied to each other via high-voltage direct current power transmission lines (DC ties) as well as containing internal DC connections such as the north-south Pacific DC Intertie, or with variable-frequency transformers (VFTs), which permit a controlled flow of energy while also functionally isolating the independent AC frequencies of each side. There are seven DC ties (ca. 200 MW each) to the Eastern Interconnection in the US and one in Canada. There are proposals to add four additional HVDC ties. It is not tied to the Alaska Interconnection.

=== Texas Interconnection ===
The Texas Interconnection is one of the three minor alternating current (AC) power grids in North America.

All of the electric utilities in the Texas Interconnection are electrically tied together during normal system conditions, and they operate at a synchronized frequency operating at an average of 60 Hz. The Texas Interconnection covers most of the state of Texas.

Interconnections can be tied to each other via high-voltage direct current power transmission lines (DC ties), or with variable-frequency transformers (VFTs), which permit a controlled flow of energy while also functionally isolating the independent AC frequencies of each side. The Texas Interconnection is tied to the Eastern Interconnection with two DC ties, and has a DC tie and a VFT to non-NERC systems in Mexico. There is one AC tie switch in Dayton, Texas that has been used only one time in its history, after Hurricane Ike.

=== Quebec Interconnection ===
The Quebec Interconnection is one of the three minor alternating-current (AC) electrical grids in North America.

The Quebec Interconnection covers all of the Province of Quebec and operates at an average system frequency of 60 Hz. It connects 18 systems in the US and Canada to one electric utility company: Hydro-Québec. It is operated as an independent AC grid for physical reasons.

The Quebec Interconnection is tied to the Eastern Interconnection with four high-voltage direct current power transmission lines (DC ties), and with one variable-frequency transformers (VFTs) line, which isolate the unsynchronized AC frequencies of each side.

=== Alaska Interconnection ===
The Alaska Interconnection is one of the three minor alternating-current (AC) electrical grids in North America.

It is composed of two grids isolated from each other as well as from the rest of North American grids, so there is not actually, physically, an Alaska Interconnection.

== Proposed improvements ==
Thirty-seven states plus the District of Columbia took some action to modernize electric grids in the first quarter of 2017, according to the North Carolina Clean Energy Technology Center. The states did so to make electricity systems "more resilient and interactive". The most common actions that states took were "advanced metering infrastructure deployment" (19 states did this), smart grid deployment and "time-varying rates for residential customers".

Legislatively, in the first quarter of the year 82 relevant bills were introduced in different parts of the United States. At the close of the quarter, most of the bills remained pending. For example, legislators in Hawaii introduced a bill that would create an energy storage tax credit. In California, the state Senate had a bill that would "create a new energy storage rebate program".

In August 2018, Advanced Energy Economy (AEE) and Citizens for Responsible Energy Solutions Forum (CRES Forum) published a policy paper that gave five recommendations on ways to modernize the U.S. electric power grid. These recommendations are to streamline the federal permit process for advanced energy projects; encourage grid planners to consider alternatives to investment in transmission; allow energy storage and energy efficiency to compete with additional energy generation; allow large customers to choose their own sources of electricity; and allow utilities and consumers to benefit from cloud computing software.

In 2019, NREL calculated that new transmission between the grids could benefit consumers by a factor of 2.5 relative to the transmission investment.

A 2022 study by National Grid plc and Hitachi Energy indicates that installing charging infrastructure for fleet electrification will require location-specific upgrades to the US electrical grid.

== See also ==
Substations on the United States grid

- Rural Electrification Act, 1930s
