= Balancing authority =

Entity in the US electric system

A balancing authority (BA) is an entity in the US electric system (as well as in parts of Canada and Mexico) that is responsible for grid balancing: resource planning and unit commitment ahead of time, maintenance of the load-interchange-generation balance within a balancing authority area (also known as a control area) and support for real-time load-frequency control. The balancing authorities are connected by metered high-voltage tie lines and grouped into interconnections:

- Eastern Interconnection consists of 31 balancing authorities in the US and 5 in Canada;
- Western Interconnection consists of 34 balancing authorities in the US, 2 in Canada, and 1 in Mexico;
- Electric Reliability Council of Texas includes a single balancing authority;
- Quebec Interconnection also with a single authority.

== Implementation ==
A typical balancing authority is an electric utility with an added responsibility to maintain a fine balance between the production and consumption of electricity, including ensuring availability of sufficient on-line generation resources and managing the electricity transfers from (and to) other balancing authorities.

Balancing authority operation is guided by mandatory reliability standards created by the North American Electric Reliability Corporation and approved by US (Federal Energy Regulatory Commission) and Canadian regulators. The enforcement authority is delegated to regional entities (8 in the US). To coordinate activities across multiple BAs, a reliability coordinator entity (RC) is used that has the power to reduce or cancel the interchange transactions and adjust the dispatch plans. Frequently the same utility plays multiple roles, for example, CAISO, in addition to being an independent system operator, also operates under the name RC West as a reliability coordinator for 42 balancing authorities and transmission operators in the Western interconnection. The interactions between the BAs and RCs can be compared to the ones between pilots and air traffic controllers.

== Operation ==
A balancing authority has the following responsibilities:

- maintaining the balance between load, generation, and external transfers;
  - short-term (load-frequency regulation);
  - longer-term (load following);
- controlling the frequency and time error;
- implementing the interchange transactions.

The coordination tasks are performed by the balancing authority staff and the automatic generation control (AGC) systems. The quantitative estimate of the balancing is provided through area control error (ACE, measured in MW), that as an indicator is conceptually similar to the role the frequency deviation plays at the interconnection level: positive ACE is pushing interconnection frequency higher.

The operation of a BA is guided by two primary external inputs (that together form the ACE):

- interchange error, a difference between the planned and measured electricity flows through the tie lines;
- frequency bias is a coefficient representing an obligation of the BA to provide or absorb energy in order to maintain the system-wide frequency or to assist in time control, it is a negative number expressed in MW/0.1Hz. As a simple example, if frequency is lower than the 60 Hz target, the BA is typically expected to provide a (usually small) amount of additional power. More precisely, BA might be required to provide more energy if its import exceeds its bias obligation (defined as the product of the frequency bias coefficient and the difference between the actual and target frequency).

To maintain the balance, a BA will dispatch the generators and, in some cases, will control the load with the goal to keep the ACE within predefined limits that are usually set to be proportional to the total load services by the BA. The control is maintained by multiple means: direct control of the generators by the computer systems, dispatch orders to power plants communicated by phone, load shedding in emergencies, and exchanging the electricity with other BAs.

== Sources ==
- WECC. "Balancing Authority and Regulation Overview" (PDF). wecc.org. Western Electricity Coordinating Council.
- NERC (July 2018). Reliability Functional Model Technical Document Version 5.1 (PDF). North American Electric Reliability Corporation.
- NERC (January 26, 2011). Balancing and Frequency Control (PDF). North American Electric Reliability Corporation. Archived from the original (PDF) on August 22, 2022.
- NERC (May 11, 2021). Balancing and Frequency Control (PDF). North American Electric Reliability Corporation. Archived from the original (PDF) on January 17, 2024.
- US Department of Energy. "How it Works: The Role of a Balancing Authority" (PDF).
