= Florida Reliability Coordinating Council =

Regional electric energy reliability organization

The Florida Reliability Coordinating Council (FRCC) was (until 2019) one of the Regional Entities (REs) that were delegated authority to ensure reliability by North American Electric Reliability Corporation (NERC) in North America and was formed on September 16, 1996. The area served by FRCC was previously served by SERC Reliability Corporation (SERC), RE functions of FRCC were transferred back to SERC in July 2019. NERC and the regional reliability councils were formed following the Northeast Blackout of 1965. FRCC's offices were located in Tampa, Florida.

The FRCC is a not-for-profit company incorporated in the state of Florida. The FRCC’s mission was to ensure that the bulk power system in Peninsular Florida is reliable, adequate and secure. The FRCC served as a regional entity with delegated authority from the North American Electric Reliability Corporation (NERC) for the purpose of proposing and enforcing reliability standards within the FRCC Region. The FRCC footprint was electrically unique in that it is tied to the interconnection on only one side. The area of the state of Florida that was within the FRCC Region is peninsular Florida east of the Apalachicola River. Areas west of the Apalachicola River stayed within the SERC Region.

The three major and two minor NERC Interconnections, and the nine NERC Regional Reliability Councils.

== See also ==
- Federal Energy Regulatory Commission
- North American Electric Reliability Corporation (NERC)
- SERC Reliability Corporation
- Western Electricity Coordinating Council
- Electric Reliability Council of Texas
- Southwest Power Pool
- Kissimmee Utility Authority
- TECO Energy
- Florida Municipal Power Agency
