= MRO =

MRO or Mro may refer to:

== People ==
- Mru (disambiguation), peoples and languages also known as Mro
- Mary Rambaran-Olm, Canadian literary historian

== Locations ==
- Hood Aerodrome (IATA code MRO), near Masterton, New Zealand
- Marlborough (disambiguation), some cities named Marlborough use MRO as an abbreviation
- Magdalena Ridge Observatory, a multi-use astronomical observatory near Socorro, New Mexico, United States
- Morradoo railway station, Melbourne
- Murchison Radio-astronomy Observatory in outback Western Australia, one of the Square Kilometre Array core sites

== Companies ==
- Hokuriku Broadcasting Company, also known as MRO, a broadcasting station in Ishikawa Prefecture, Japan
- Marathon Oil Corporation, listed on the New York Stock Exchange as MRO
- Melrose Industries, listed on the London Stock Exchange as MRO
- MRO Software, a software company best known for its Maximo maintenance management system

== Organisations ==
- Middlesex Record Office, former historical organisation, merged into the current-day London Metropolitan Archives in 1965
- Midwest Reliability Organization, an electrical grid reliability organization
- Oriental Revolutionary Movement (Movimiento Revolucionario Oriental), a Marxist–Leninist communist party in Uruguay
- Mountains and Rivers Order, headquartered at the Zen Mountain Monastery in Mount Tremper, New York
- Macedonian Revolutionary Organization, a revolutionary national liberation organization
- Metsähovi Radio Observatory, an astronomical radio observatory in Kirkkonummi, Finland

== Operations and techniques ==
- Maintenance, repair and operations (or overhaul), fixing or maintaining any sort of mechanical, plumbing or electrical equipment
- Main refinancing operations, a technique used by the European Central Bank to control the money supply
- Medical Review Office, the entity in which a medical professional reviews the results of a drug test. This professional may also have the title of Medical Review Officer.

== Linguistics ==
- Mro language (ISO 639 code: cmr), a Kukish language of Burma
- Mru language (ISO 639 code: mro), a Sino-Tibetan language of Bangladesh
- Mro (Unicode block), the Unicode block containing characters for writing the Bangladesh Mru language

== Other uses ==
- Mars Reconnaissance Orbiter, a NASA Mars probe
- Mini Racing Online, an arcade-style, freeware online multiplayer racing game
- The ISO 4217 code for the Mauritanian ouguiya, the currency of Mauritania
- MRO-A, MRO-D, MRO-Z; the MRO-series of RPG weapons
- Mitochondrion-related organelle

== See also ==
- Mr. O (Canadian TV show), 1950s children's show
