= Grid balancing =

Balancing power supply with demand

Energy from wind, sunlight or other renewable energy is converted to potential energy for storage in devices such as electric batteries or higher-elevation water reservoirs. The stored potential energy is later converted to electricity that is added to the power grid, even when the original energy source is not available.

Grid balancing ensures that electricity consumption matches electricity production of an electrical grid at any moment. Electricity is by its nature difficult to store and has to be available on demand, so the supply shall match the demand very closely at any time despite the continuous variations of both. In a deregulated grid, a transmission system operator is responsible for the balancing (in the US electric system smaller entities, so called balancing authorities, are in charge, overseen by reliability coordinators). In a wide area synchronous grid the short-term balancing is coupled with frequency control: as long as the balance is maintained, the frequency stays constant (at the scheduled frequency), whenever a small mismatch between aggregate demand and aggregate supply occurs, it is restored due to both supply and demand being frequency-sensitive: lower frequency increases the supply, and higher frequency increases the demand.

As of the beginning of 2020s, the actual balancing service was provided primarily by the conventional power stations: frequently, the only quick-response safety margin is the inertial response provided by the kinetic energy of the physically rotating machinery (synchronous generators and turbines). If there is a mismatch between supply and demand the generators absorb extra energy by speeding up or produce more power by slowing down causing the utility frequency (either 50 or 60 hertz) to increase or decrease. However, the frequency cannot deviate too much from the target: many units of the electrical equipment can be destroyed by the out-of-bounds frequency and thus will automatically disconnect from the grid to protect themselves, potentially triggering a blackout.

Since the 20th century grid balancing has become less predictable with more variable renewable energy being installed into the grid. This has resulted in wind farms being turned off at night time, when wind is high and demand for power is low. In Scotland this has resulted in payouts, most recently over £6m in 33 days has been paid by the grid to wind farms to not generate electricity.

Constraint payments are made to other electricity suppliers as well as wind. In 2011/2012, payments by the National Grid in the UK totaled £324 million of which £31 million went to wind. In 2012/2013, thanks to improved transmission capability, they were £130 million of which only £7 million were for wind.

This temporary excess of electric energy could alternatively be used in electrolysis of water to make high purity hydrogen fuel used in fuel cells. In areas with little hydroelectricity, pumped storage systems such as the Dinorwig Power Station can allow the energy to be used for operational reserve or at times of peak demand rather than run a natural gas peaking power plant.

== See also ==
- Intermittent energy source
- Duck curve

== Sources ==
- Ahlqvist, Victor; Holmberg, Pär; Tangerås, Thomas (March 2022). "A survey comparing centralized and decentralized electricity markets". Energy Strategy Reviews. 40 100812. Bibcode:2022EneSR..4000812A. doi:10.1016/j.esr.2022.100812. ISSN 2211-467X. S2CID 246215293.
- Stawska, Anna; Romero, Natalia; de Weerdt, Mathijs; Verzijlbergh, Remco (January 2021). "Demand response: For congestion management or for grid balancing?". Energy Policy. 148 111920. Bibcode:2021EnPol.14811920S. doi:10.1016/j.enpol.2020.111920. ISSN 0301-4215. S2CID 225128593.
- NERC (May 11, 2021). Balancing and Frequency Control (PDF). North American Electric Reliability Corporation.
