= Tres Amigas SuperStation =

Proposed energy infrastructure project in Clovis, New Mexico

- Proposed location for the Tres Amigas SuperStation
- Official name: Tres Amigas SuperStation
- Country: United States
- Coordinates: 34°24′N 103°05′W
- Status: Cancelled
- Owner: Tres Amigas LLP

External links
- Website: www.tresamigasllc.com (archive)

The Tres Amigas SuperStation (lit. 'Three Friends SuperStation') was a project proposed in 2009 to unite North America’s two major power grids (the Eastern Interconnection and the Western Interconnection) and one of its three minor grids (the Texas Interconnection), with the goals of enabling faster adoption of renewable energy and increasing the reliability of the U.S. grid.

In 2015, the project lost access to the Eastern Interconnection (72% of its total peak demand) when Southwestern Public Service dropped out. Tres Amigas officials reiterated their plans to connect the eastern and western grids in 2017 even as leases for property intended to construct the project were relinquished that February according to New Mexico's State Land Office. The project subsequently fell silent, and as of 2021 company officials were unreachable.

CEO Phillip G. Harris is the former CEO of PJM Interconnection, an East Coast regional transmission organization (RTO). The site of Clovis, New Mexico was chosen to allow the Texas Interconnection to join if desired.

== Overview ==
The Tres Amigas SuperStation project proposes to tie the East Coast, West Coast and Texas grids together via three 5 GW superconductive high-voltage direct current power transmission lines, which permit a controlled flow of energy while also functionally isolating the independent AC frequencies of each side. Isolation is important because while all three grids have a nominal frequency of 60 Hz, their true frequencies at any given time can fluctuate by a significant margin (± 0.1 Hz), rendering the synchronization of the grids essentially impossible and leaving them out-of-phase from one another. With DC-links, however, the design can be scaled to 30 GW. Tres Amigas would use high-temperature superconductor (HTS) wire supplied by American Superconductor Corp.

The Tres Amigas SuperStation plans to act as a power market hub, enabling the buying and selling of electricity among three of North America's largest interconnections above the amount available today. The Texas Interconnection has 5 DC ties to the other grids, totaling 1,100 MW. The Eastern Interconnection, Western Interconnection, and Texas Interconnection have peak demands of 585 GW (72%), 166 GW (20%), and 64 GW (8%) respectively.

The project will provide solar, wind and other renewable developers with the transmission infrastructure needed to transport clean electricity to population centers.

In 2015, the project lost access to the Eastern Interconnection (72% of the total peak demand) when Southwestern Public Service dropped out. Yet Tres Amigas officials reiterated their plans to connect the eastern and western grids in 2016 and 2017, and announced costs were falling due to new technology. However, the project has since fallen silent, and as of 2021, company officials are unreachable.

== Location ==
The two major and three minor NERC Interconnections, and the nine NERC Regional Reliability Councils.

The Tres Amigas super station will be located on a 22-square-mile (57 km^{2}) state plot of land near Clovis, New Mexico, leased for 99 years at $9 million per year. In 2017, this estimate was reduced.

== Cost ==
Early estimates of the cost put the project budget at around $1 billion, and later at $2 billion. In 2017, the cost was scaled down to $200 million due to new technology and changes in the project's business model.

== Project schedule and status ==
Proposed in 2009. In 2011, Tres Amigas SuperStation (TAS) awarded Alstom Grid a €150m (£132.4m) contract for a 750MW, 345kV DC converter scheme for a VSC connecting PNM and Xcel Energy in 2014. Construction was planned to begin in Summer 2012.

In 2010, Scandia Wind Southwest LLC proposed to build an initial 2,250 megawatts of wind power in the Texas Panhandle, with a potential capacity of 10,000 MW. Tres Amigas could distribute this power, but it met some opposition.

Phase 1, the connection of East Coast and West Coast grids, could cost $400 million, and all 3 phases could then cost $1.2 billion.

In 2012, then-President Ben Shelly of the Navajo Nation expressed interest in investing $12 million in the project.

In 2013, two key announcements confirmed the ongoing progress of the project, and an expected commercial load date of 2016.

The company will move its headquarters to downtown Albuquerque, in the former Petroleum Club building.

In 2015, the Southwest Power Pool (SPP) cancelled an agreement with the project.

In February 2017, it was announced that the project was still progressing to connect the Eastern and Western Interconnection but would be significantly scaled back from the previous full project estimate of $1.5 billion to $200 million. The project is also subject to possible relocation due to reduced land needs.

As of 2021, there are no further updates, and construction has not begun.

== See also ==
- List of energy storage projects
