= Control area =

Control area may refer to:

- Control area (aviation), a volume of controlled airspace that exists in the vicinity of an airport.
- Control area, a balancing area within an electrical grid.
