= Northeast Blackout =

Northeast Blackout may refer to:

- Northeast blackout of 1965, a power outage that affected parts of Ontario, Canada, and the Northeastern United States
- Northeast blackout of 2003, a power outage the affected parts of Ontario, Canada, and the Northeastern and Midwestern United States
