= Midwest Reliability Organization =

Regional electric energy reliability organization

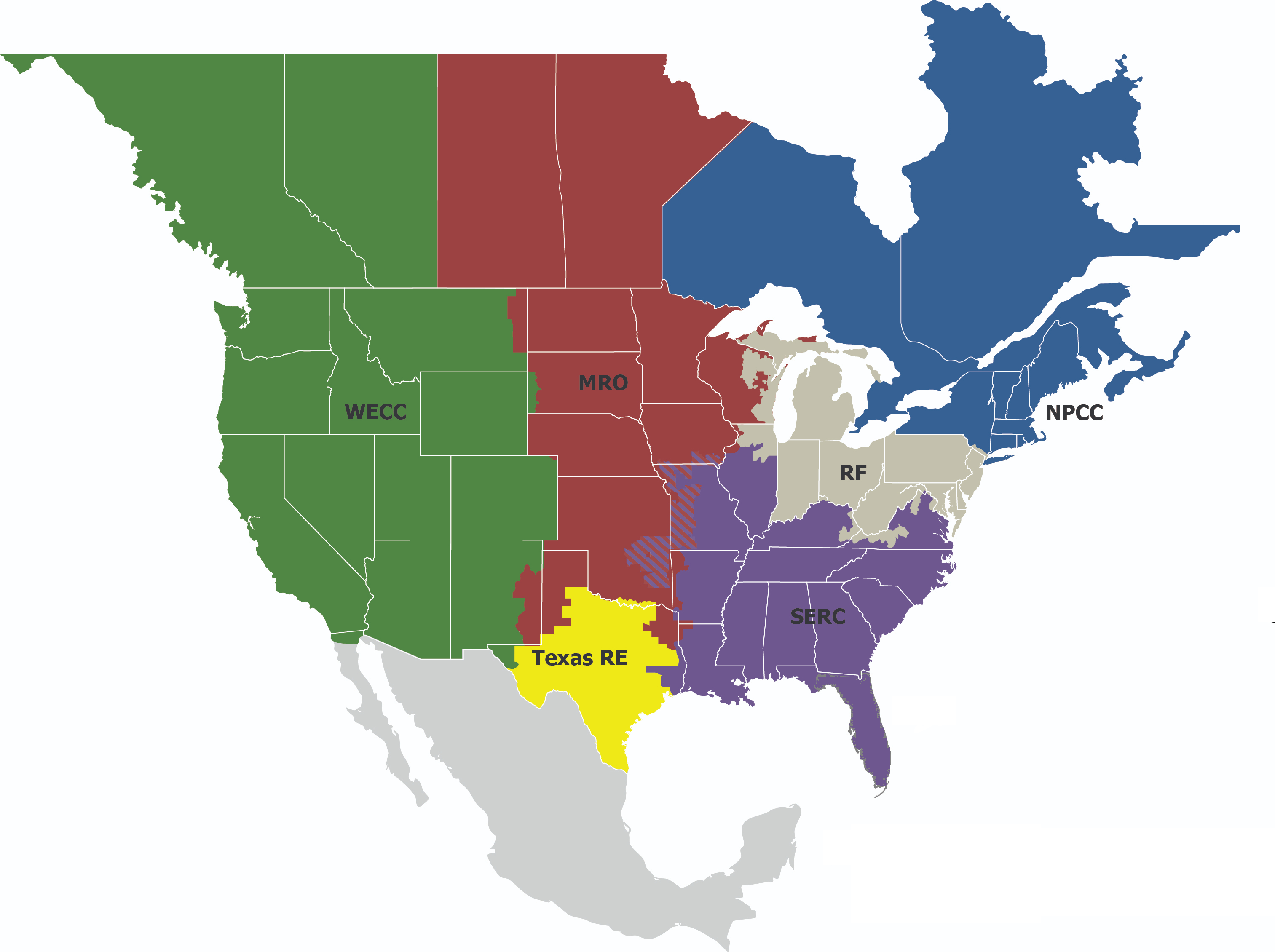
Regional entities (2021). MRO is in the center

The Midwest Reliability Organization (MRO) began operations on January 1, 2005, as the successor to the Mid-continent Area Power Pool (MAPP), which was formed in 1965. MRO is one of six regional entities under North American Electric Reliability Corporation (NERC) authority. NERC and the regional reliability councils were formed following the Northeast Blackout of 1965. MRO's offices are located in St. Paul, Minnesota. MRO members include municipal utilities, cooperatives, investor-owned utilities, a federal power marketing agency, Canadian Crown Corporations, and independent power producers.

The MRO region lies within the Eastern Interconnection and occupies upper midwestern North America, covering all of the states of Minnesota, North Dakota and Nebraska, portions of the states of Arkansas, Illinois, Iowa, Kansas, Louisiana, Michigan, Missouri, Montana, New Mexico, Oklahoma, South Dakota, Texas, and Wisconsin, as well as the Provinces of Saskatchewan and Manitoba in Canada. The MRO has four of the six high-voltage direct current ties which connect the Eastern Interconnection to the Western Interconnection, and also has ties to non-NERC systems in Northern Canada.

The Federal Energy Regulatory Commissions (FERC) approved the dissolution of Southwest Power Pool (SPP) as a reliability organization on May 4, 2018, resulting in the transfer of many of SPP's registered entities to MRO, effective July 2018. SPP remains as a regional transmission organization, while part of MRO's territory is served by the Midcontinent Independent System Operator.

== See also ==
- North American Electric Reliability Corporation (NERC)
