= Mru =

Mru or Mro may refer to:

- Mru people, also known as Mro, Murong, Taung Mro, Mrung, or Mrucha, a tribal people of Myanmar, Bangladesh, and India
  - Mru language or Mrung, a Sino-Tibetan language of the Mru / Mrucha people
- Mro (Unicode block), a Unicode block containing characters used in the Mru / Mrung language
- Mro-Khimi people, also known as Mro, Awa Khami Mro, Wakim, Mro Chin or Awa Khami, a Chin people of Myanmar
  - Mro-Khimi language, also known as Mro, Mro Wakim or Mro Chin, the Kuki-Chin language of the Mro-Khimi people

== See also ==
- MRU (disambiguation)
- MRO (disambiguation)
- Mruic languages, a group of Sino-Tibetan languages including Mru
