= ReliabilityFirst =

Regional electric energy reliability organization

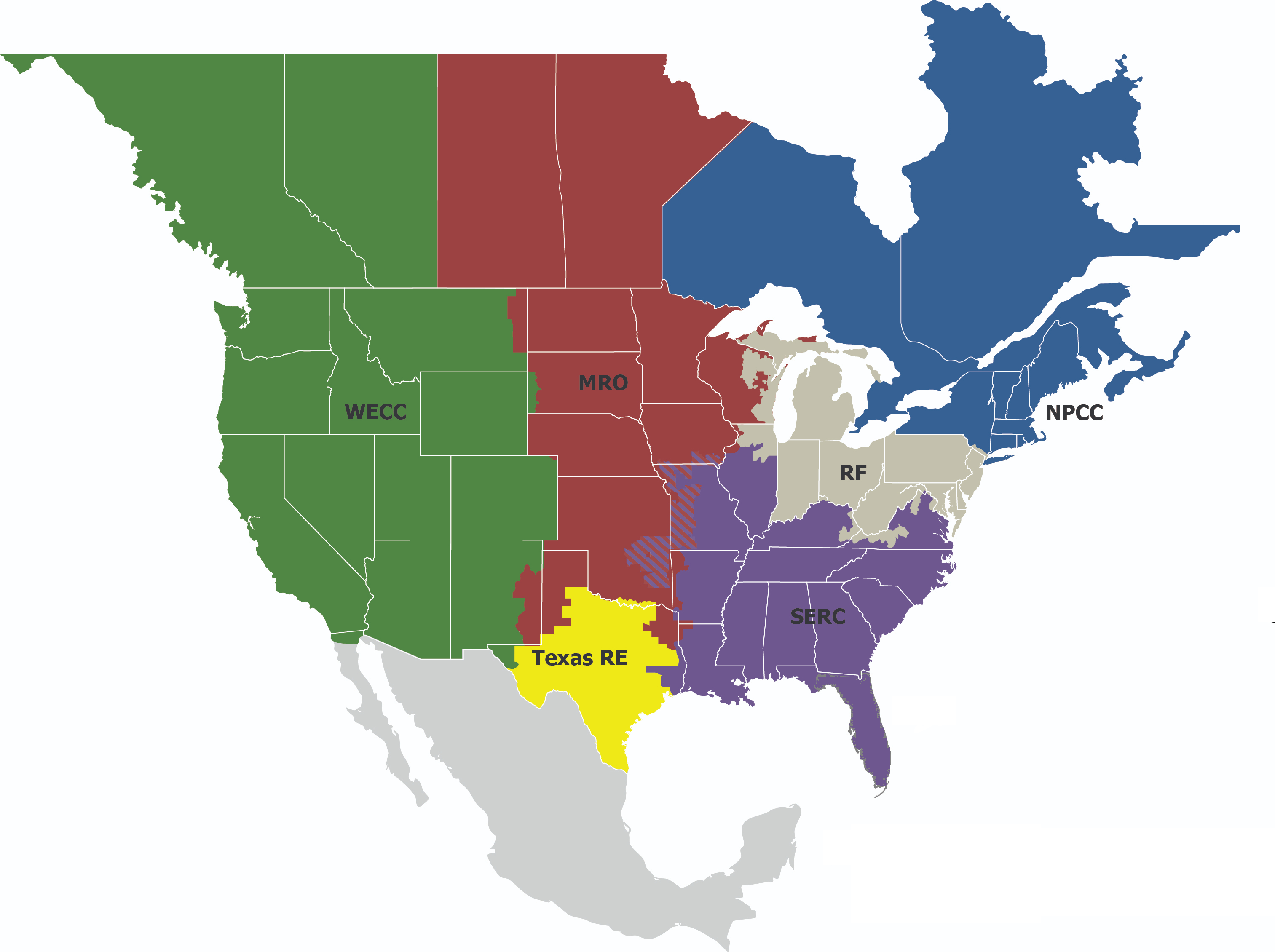
Six NERC Regional Entities in 2021

ReliabilityFirst (RF) is one of the six Federal Energy Regulatory Commission (FERC)-approved regional entities responsible for ensuring the reliability of the North American Bulk-Power System, pursuant to the Energy Policy Act of 2005. ReliabilityFirst performs this function pursuant to and under its delegation agreement with North American Electric Reliability Corporation (NERC), which is the Commission-approved Electric Reliability Organization. NERC and the Regional Entities are non-governmental, self-regulatory organizations that were created in recognition of, among other things, the complex, interconnected, and international nature of the North American Bulk Power-System.

ReliabilityFirst's stated mission is to preserve and enhance the reliability and security of the bulk power system within the RF region. This mission includes developing, monitoring, and enforcing compliance to FERC-approved reliability standards for all owners, operators, and users of the bulk power system; the development and dissemination of timely and instructive information (including assist visits, internal control evaluations, lessons learned, seminars, workshops, and periodic reports) to enhance the reliability of the bulk power system; and providing seasonal and long-term assessments of bulk power system reliability.

The RF region is situated within the Eastern Interconnection and covers territory stretching from the Eastern United States to the lower Great Lakes, including all or portions of New Jersey, Pennsylvania, Delaware, Maryland, Virginia, West Virginia, Ohio, Michigan, Kentucky, Tennessee, Indiana, Illinois, Wisconsin, and the District of Columbia.

ReliabilityFirst commenced operations on January 1, 2006, and is the successor to three reliability organizations: the Mid-Atlantic Area Council (MAAC), the East Central Area Coordination Agreement (ECAR), and the Mid-American Interconnected Network (MAIN), all of which were formed in response to the Northeast Blackout of 1965.

ReliabilityFirst's offices are located in Cleveland, Ohio.

== See also ==
- North American Electric Reliability Corporation (NERC)
- PJM Interconnection
- Midcontinent Independent System Operator
