= Eastern Interconnection =

Power grid in eastern North America

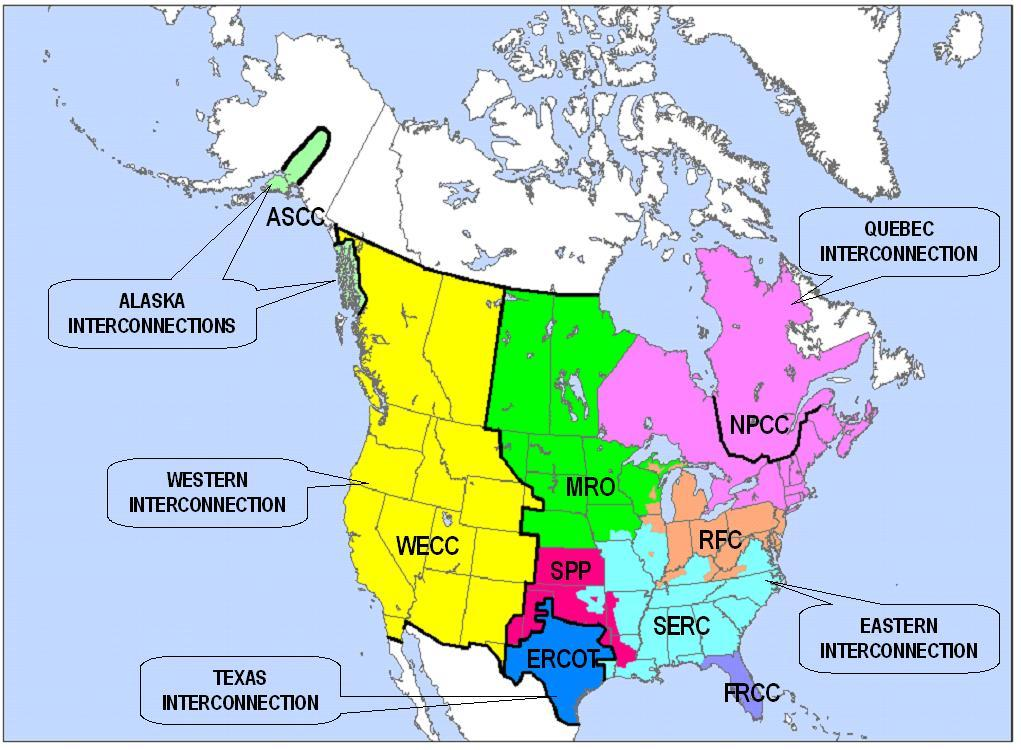
The two major and three minor NERC interconnections, and the nine NERC Regional Reliability Councils

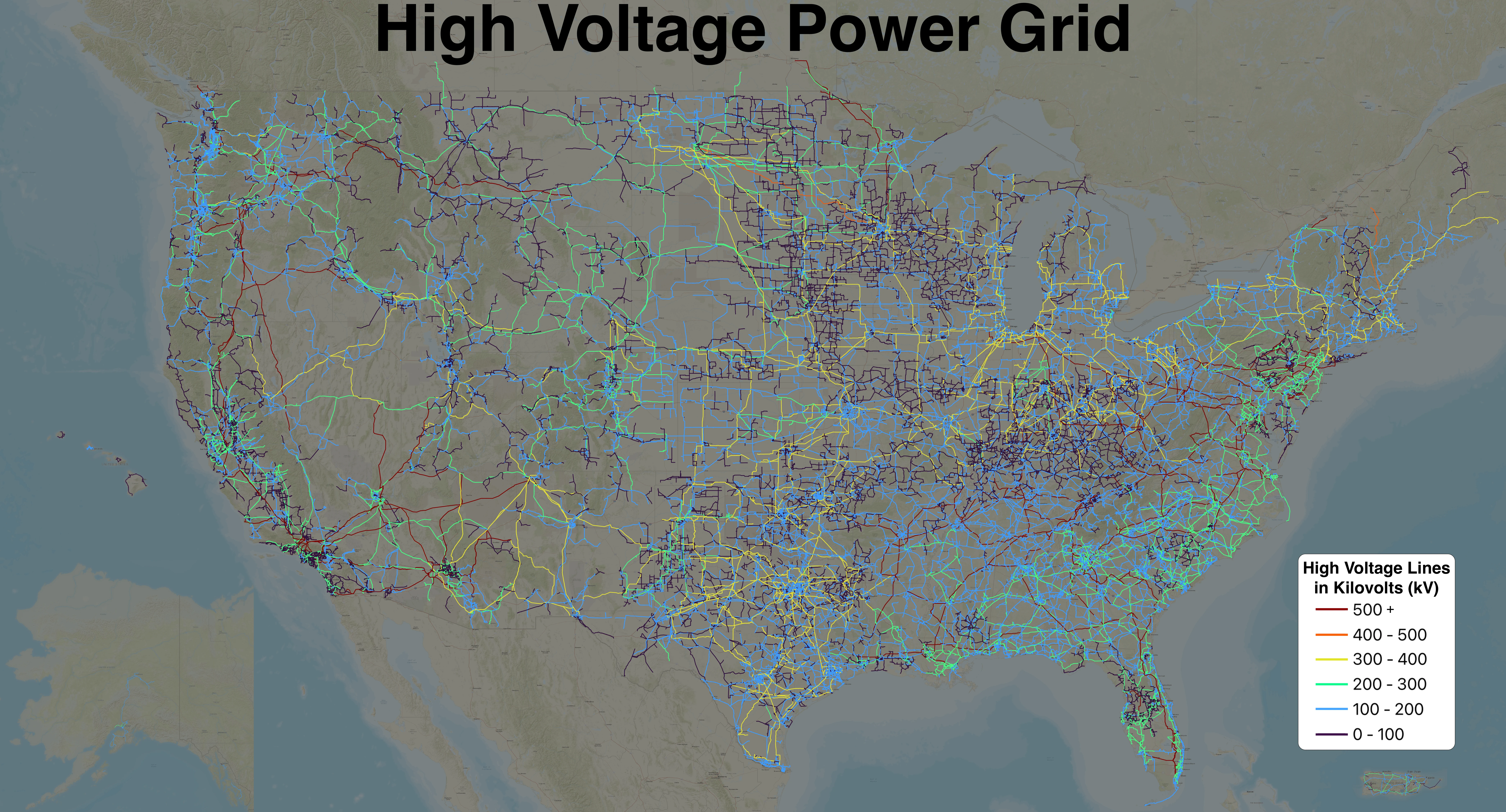
High voltage power grid in the United States in kilovolts (kV) 500+ 400-500 300-400 200-300 100-200 <100

The Eastern Interconnection is one of the two major alternating-current (AC) electrical grids in the North American power transmission grid. The other major interconnection is the Western Interconnection. The three minor interconnections are the Quebec, Alaska, and Texas interconnections.

All of the electric utilities in the Eastern Interconnection are electrically tied together during normal system conditions and operate at a synchronized frequency at an average of 60 Hz. The Eastern Interconnection reaches from Central Canada eastward to the Atlantic coast (excluding Quebec), south to Florida, and back to the western Great Plains (excluding most of Texas).

Interconnections can be tied to each other via high-voltage direct current power transmission lines (DC ties), or with variable-frequency transformers (VFTs), which permit a controlled flow of energy while also functionally isolating the independent AC frequencies of each side. The Eastern Interconnection is tied to the Western Interconnection with six DC ties, to the Texas Interconnection with two DC ties, and to the Quebec Interconnection with four DC ties and a VFT.

In 2016, National Renewable Energy Laboratory simulated a year with 30% renewable energy (wind and solar power) in 5-minute intervals. Results show a stable grid with some changes in operation.

== Electricity demand ==
The North American Electric Reliability Corporation (NERC) reported in 2008 the following actual and projected consumption for the regions of the Eastern Interconnection (all figures in gigawatts):

in GW	Summer			Winter		
Region	2007	2017	Growth	2007	2017	Growth
FRCC	47	57	21.3%	42	60	42.9%
MRO (US)	42	52	23.8%	35	42	20.0%
NPCC (US)	61	69	13.1%	48	53	10.4%
RFC	180	209	16.1%	141	164	16.3%
SERC	209	243	16.3%	179	209	16.8%
SPP	43	51	18.6%	31	38	22.6%
US- East Interconnection	582	681	17.0%	476	566	18.9%
MRO (CAN)	6.2	6.9	11.3%	7.3	8.2	12.3%
NPCC (CAN)	50.3	50.7	0.8%	65.0	66.7	2.6%
CAN- East Interconnection	56.5	57.6	2.0%	72.3	74.9	3.6%
Eastern Interconnection	638.5	738.6	15.7%	548.3	640.9	16.9%

== See also ==
- Northeast blackout of 1965
- Northeast blackout of 2003
