= Regional entity =

Regional electric energy reliability organization

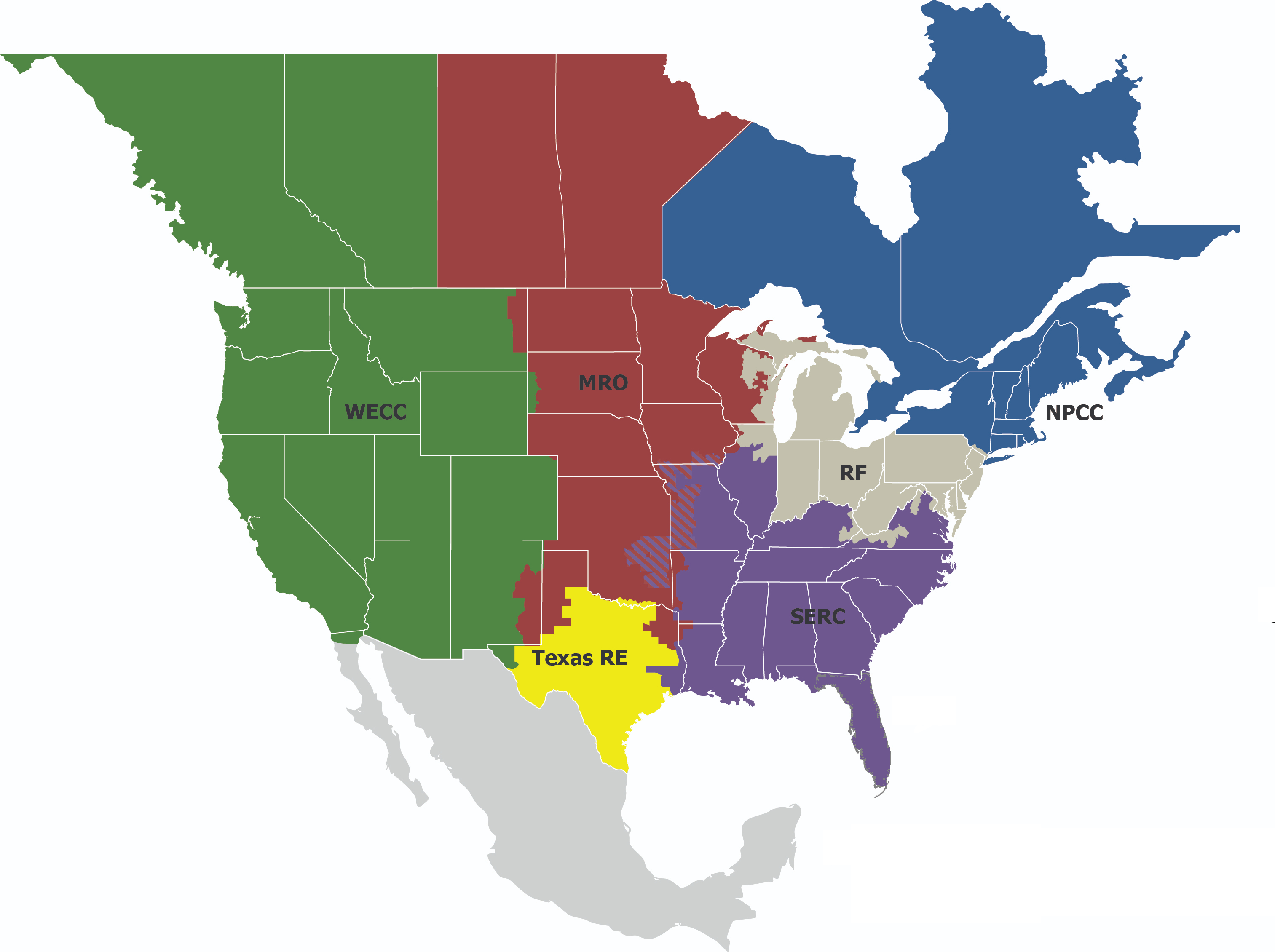
The six North American regional entities in 2021. The striped area indicates the regions where the load-serving entities belong to one RE, and the transmission system operator to another.

A regional entity (RE) in the North American power transmission grid is a regional organization representing all segments of the electric industry: electric utilities (investor-owned, cooperatives, state, regional, and municipal), federal agencies, independent power producers, power market operators, and end-users of the energy. North American Electric Reliability Corporation (NERC) delegates to REs authority to enforce reliability standards (which NERC has throughout the contiguous United States), collectively REs, together with NERC, are known as an "ERO Enterprise" (from the Electric Reliability Organization).

== History ==
The regional entities, at the bottom of the structure for the development and enforcement of the reliability standards for the US electric grid, were established by the Section 215 of the Federal Power Act as amended by the Energy Policy Act of 2005. The statute tried to mimic the balance of power between the federal and state authorities in the US, with REs playing the role of regional (state-like) components.

As of 2021, there were six regional entities:

- Midwest Reliability Organization (MRO);
- Northeast Power Coordinating Council (NPCC);
- ReliabilityFirst (RF);
- SERC Reliability Corporation (SERC);
- Texas Reliability Entity (Texas RE);
- Western Electricity Coordinating Council (WECC).

The original list included eight entities, two REs were later dissolved:

- Southwest Power Pool regional entity operation was dissolved in 2018 (by merging into MRO),
- Florida Reliability Coordinating Council was dissolved in July 2019 (by merging into SERC).

== Functions ==
The reliability standard development process had Regional Entities developing regional standards, to be approved by NERC and FERC. By the 2010, the process was slow: just nine standards were developed, all by the WECC.

An RE approves the transmission plans and chooses the projects for regional (as opposed to per-local-pricing-zone) cost allocation.

One of the important roles of an RE is suggesting to NERC (and FERC) to include the facilities into - or exclude from - the list of "elements" that constitute the bulk-power system (BPS, also known as a "bulk electric system", BES), subject to the oversight of the NERC.

== Sources ==
- North American Electric Reliability Corporation (August 2013). "Frequently Asked Questions" (PDF). nerc.com. NERC.
- North American Electric Reliability Corporation (May 11, 2021). "Balancing and Frequency Control" (PDF). nerc.com. NERC. Archived from the original (PDF) on 17 January 2024.
- Carpentier, Deborah (22 August 2014). "NERC and Enforcement Issues: NERC Provides New Definition of Bulk Electric System" (PDF). Natural Gas & Electricity. 31 (2): 29–32. doi:10.1002/gas.21785. ISSN 1545-7893.
- Skees, J. Daniel (June 2010). "Inventing the Future of Reliability: FERC's Recent Orders and the Consolidation of Reliability Authority". The Electricity Journal. 23 (5): 7–15. Bibcode:2010ElecJ..23e...7S. doi:10.1016/j.tej.2010.04.015. ISSN 1040-6190.
