= Mark Lauby =

American electrical engineer

Mark Gerald Lauby is an electrical engineer working for the North American Electric Reliability Corporation (NERC) in Atlanta, Georgia where he is senior vice president and chief engineer. Lauby was named a Fellow of the Institute of Electrical and Electronics Engineers (IEEE) in 2012 for his work in the development and application of techniques for bulk power system reliability. He also received the IEEE PES Roy Billinton Award in 2014 for his contribution to reliability of electric power systems and currently is a committee member for the award. In 2020, the National Academy of Engineering (NAE) elected Mr. Lauby as a member, citing his development and application of techniques for electrical grid reliability analysis.

== Education and career ==
In 2012, Mr. Lauby was elected to the North American Energy Standards Board and was appointed to the Department of Energy’s Electric Advisory Committee by the Secretary of Energy from 2013–2017. From 1999 to 2007, Mr. Lauby was appointed as a member of the Board of Excellent Energy International Co., LTD, an energy service company based in Thailand. He has been recognized for his achievements by many technical associations, including the 1992 IEEE Walter Fee Young Engineer of the Year Award. He was named a Fellow by IEEE in November 2011 for “leadership in the development and application of techniques for bulk power system reliability,” and in 2014, Mr. Lauby was awarded the IEEE Power and Energy Society’s Roy Billinton Power System Reliability Award. In 2020, the National Academy of Engineering (NAE) elected Mr. Lauby as a member, citing his development and application of techniques for electric grid reliability analysis.

Prior to joining NERC, Mr. Lauby worked for the Electric Power Research Institute (EPRI) for 20 years, holding a number of senior positions, including: director, Power Delivery and Markets; managing director, Asia, EPRI International; and manager, Power System Engineering in the Power System Planning and Operations Program. Mr. Lauby began his electric industry career in 1979 at the Mid-Continent Area Power Pool in Minneapolis, Minnesota. His responsibilities included transmission planning, power system reliability assessment, and probabilistic evaluation.

Mr. Lauby is the author of more than 100 technical papers on the subjects of power system reliability, expert systems, transmission system planning, and power system numerical analysis techniques. Mr. Lauby served as chair and is a life member of the International Electricity Research Exchange and served as chair of a number of IEEE working groups. He earned his bachelor’s and master’s degrees in Electrical Engineering from the University of Minnesota. In addition, Mr. Lauby attended the London Business School Accelerated Development Program as well as the Executive Leadership Program at Harvard Business School.
