= MRU =

MRU may refer to:

== Athletic organizations ==
- Malaysian Rugby Union, (Malay: Kesatuan Ragbi Malaysia) the governing body for rugby union in Malaysia
- Manawatu Rugby Union, the governing body of the sport of Rugby union in the Manawatu rugby province
- Manawhenua Rugby Union, a New Zealand rugby union team made from the Manawatu and Horowhenua provinces
- Marlborough Rugby Union, a New Zealand rugby union team that played from 1888 to 2005
- Mauritius Rugby Union, the governing body for rugby union in Mauritius

== Computing ==
- Most Recently Used, a cache replacement algorithm
- Most Recently Used menu, a specific menu in Microsoft Windows;
- Maximum Receive Unit, see Maximum transmission unit

== People ==
- Rafi Usmani, a religious scholar in the Islamic Republic of Pakistan
- Mihai Răzvan Ungureanu (born 1968), Romanian historian, politician and former Prime Minister of Romania

== Schools ==
- Mykolas Romeris University, in Lithuania
- Mount Royal University, in Calgary, Alberta, Canada
- Muteesa I Royal University, in Uganda

== Other uses ==
- Mauritanian ouguiya, currency by ISO 4217 code
- MRU Holdings, a New York-based financial services company that specialized in higher education financing products
- Mano River Union, a political union in Africa
- Międzyrzecz Fortification Region (Polish:Międzyrzecki Rejon Umocniony), a military defence line in Western Poland
- Sir Seewoosagur Ramgoolam International Airport in Mauritius, IATA Code: MRU
- Motion Reference Unit, an inertial measurement technology

== See also ==
- Mru (disambiguation)
