= Northeast Power Coordinating Council =

Regional electric energy reliability organization

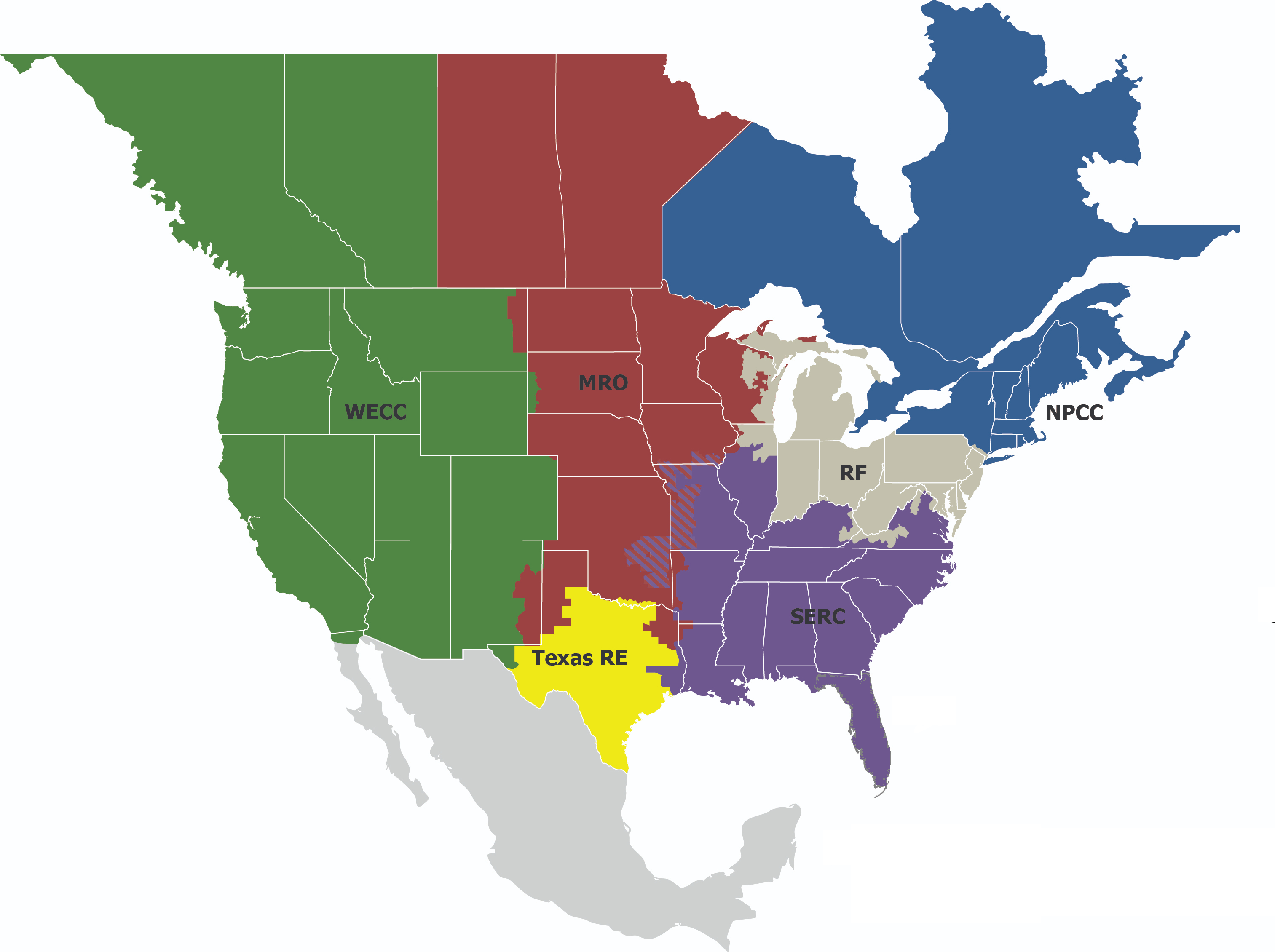
- Six regional entities (2021)
- Abbreviation: NPCC
- Founded: January 19, 1966; 60 years ago
- Type: 501(c)(6)
- Legal status: Nonprofit corporation
- Purpose: To promote and improve the reliability of the international, interconnected bulk power systems in northeastern North America through its Regional Entity and Criteria Services divisions.
- Region served: Maine, Vermont, New Hampshire, Massachusetts, New York, Connecticut, Rhode Island, Ontario, Québec, New Brunswick, Nova Scotia
- President, Chief Executive Officer: Charles Dickerson

The Northeast Power Coordinating Council (NPCC) was formed on January 19, 1966, as a successor to the Canada–United States Eastern Interconnection (CANUSE). It was established to improve the reliability of electric service. NPCC is one of six regional entities under North American Electric Reliability Corporation (NERC) authority. NERC and the regional reliability councils were formed following the Northeast Blackout of 1965. NPCC's offices are located in New York City, New York.

The NPCC region lies within the Eastern Interconnection and encompasses the greater New England area of North America, covering all the States of Maine, Vermont, New Hampshire, Massachusetts, New York, Connecticut, Rhode Island, and the Provinces of Ontario, Québec, New Brunswick, and Nova Scotia. NPCC also has ties to non-NERC systems in eastern Canada. In terms of load served, NPCC accounts for 20% of the Eastern interconnection's total load demand, and 70% of Canada's entire demand.

The Hydro-Québec system, which encompasses all of Québec, is commonly considered part of the Eastern Interconnection, even though it is technically a separate interconnection. It is connected to the rest of the NPCC and Eastern Interconnection through four high voltage direct current ties.

At the time of its formation in 1966, NPCC had 22 utility systems as members. As of 2019, NPCC has 90 members.

== See also ==
- North American Electric Reliability Corporation (NERC)
- List of major power outages
