= Alaska Interconnection =

American AC power transmission grid

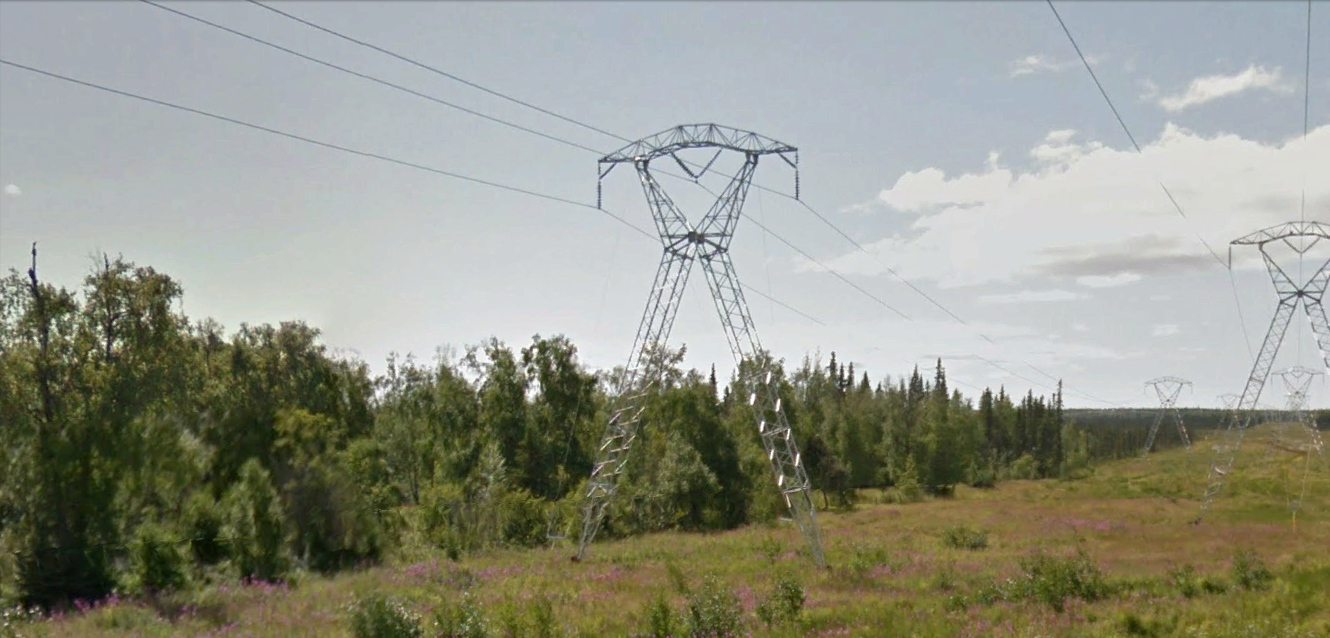
230 kV transmission lines carrying power from the Beluga power station to the Anchorage metropolitan area.

Interconnections in North America

The Alaska Interconnection (ASCC) is an AC power transmission grid in North America that serves Central and Southeast Alaska. While the Alaska Interconnection is often referred to as one interconnected grid, its two parts are not connected to each other through interconnectors, nor are the two grids connected to any other interconnection, making the grids in Alaska isolated circuits. Both grids, though, are managed by the Alaska Systems Coordinating Council (ASCC) as if they were one entity like the other interconnections in North America. ASCC was formed in 1983 and is an affiliate North American Electric Reliability Corporation (NERC) member.

== Production ==
The Alaska Interconnection is the smallest individual power transmission grid in North America compared to the three other major interconnections – the Western Interconnection, the Eastern Interconnection, and the Texas Interconnection – both in physical area and electricity generated. In 2015, the Alaska interconnection generated 2,601 gigawatt hours of electricity, with natural gas accounting for 1,219 GWh, while the US State of Washington alone – part of the Western Interconnection – generated 47,385 GWh. While both parts of the Alaska Interconnection have no connection to remaining interconnections of North America, all generating units connected to both of its grids generate at a synchronous speed of 60 Hz, the frequency common to North America. Electricity is also delivered to homes and small businesses in the same manner as in Canada and the contiguous United States with a split-phase 120/240 volt service.

== Isolation from other power grids ==
In 2014, an interconnector to the Western Interconnection of British Columbia was proposed to the Alaska Energy Authority in order to bring cleaner, cheaper power to Alaska, but as of 2016, no further work on the project had been completed due to economic feasibility.

=== Impact to cost ===
Because the transmission networks in Alaska are isolated from other interconnections in North America, average rates for electricity are $0.18 per kWh – the second highest price in the United States after Hawaii, whose average residential rate is $0.37 per kWh. In contrast, the average rate for electricity in the 48 contiguous states is $0.10 per kWh.

== See also ==
- Alaska Electric Light & Power
