= Texas Reliability Entity =

Regional electric energy reliability organization

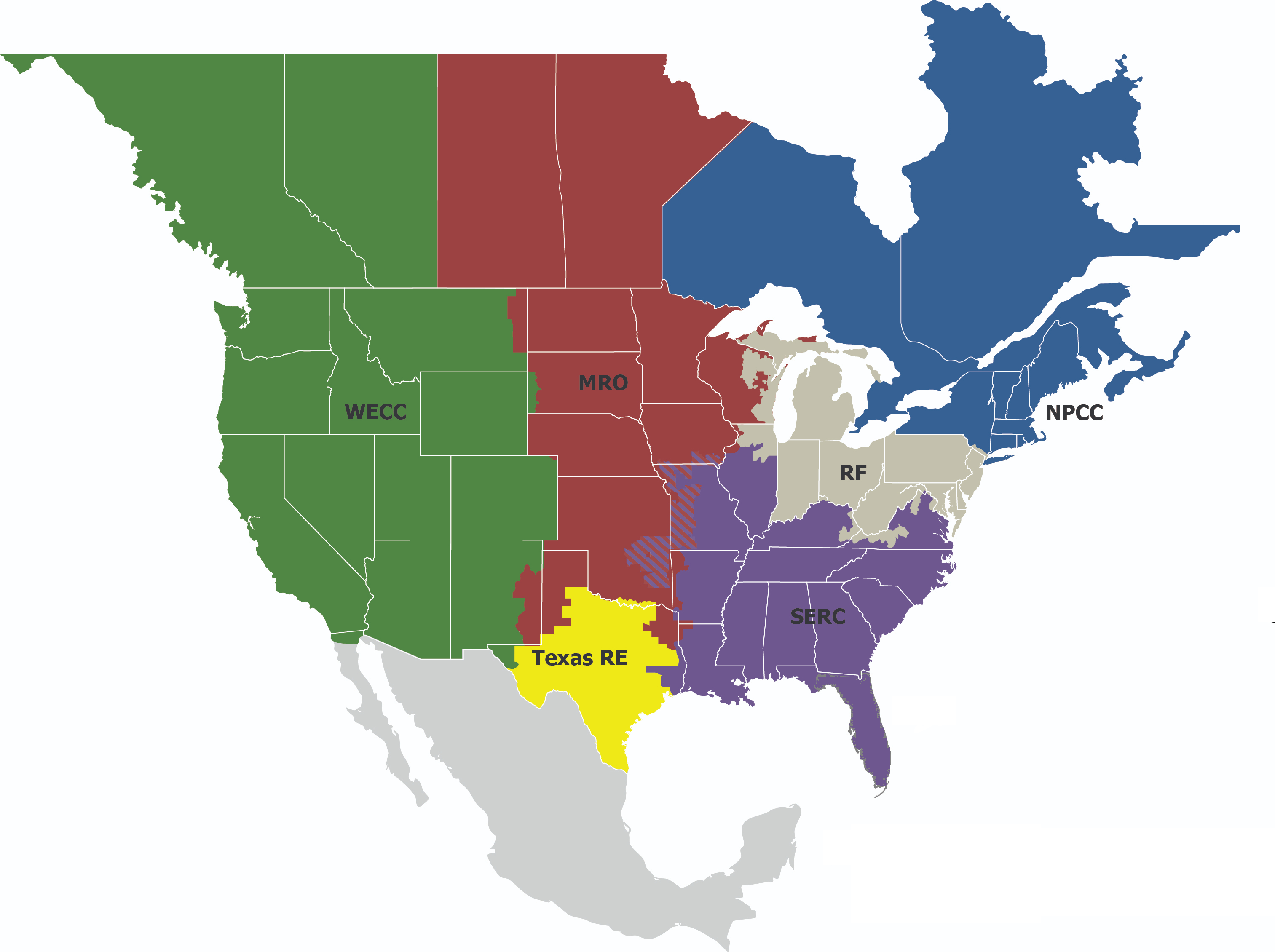
Map of the Regional Entities (2021), with Texas RE in yellow

The Texas Reliability Entity (Texas RE or TRE) is one of the six Regional Entities under North American Electric Reliability Corporation (NERC) authority. Each Regional Entity is tasked with compliance, monitoring, and enforcement on the behalf of NERC to ensure bulk power system reliability. Texas RE was formed on January 1, 2010 to succeed Texas Regional Entity as the Regional Entity for the Electric Reliability Council of Texas (ERCOT). ERCOT is located in Texas, covering 75% of the state's land area and 90% of its electric load, making it the only Regional Entity that serves both a single interconnection (the Texas Interconnection) and a single state.

Users, owners, and operators within ERCOT are eligible for membership in Texas RE at no cost. Members are categorized in one of seven membership Sectors: Cooperative Utility, Generation, Load-Serving, Marketing, Municipal Utility, System Coordination and Planning, and Transmission and Distribution.

Jeffrey Corbett currently serves as the chair of the Texas RE board of directors and Jim Albright serves as the president and chief executive officer. In addition to having a board of directors as well as officers, Texas RE has a Member Representatives Committee (MRC) consisting of 11 representatives. The MRC is composed of two representatives from each Sector, with the exception of Sectors with only one corporate member, which only have one representative on the MRC. The MRC directly advises the board with respect to Texas RE's annual budgets, business plans, and funding mechanisms. It also advises the board on the reliability of the bulk power system, the development of Regional Reliability Standards and Regional Variances, and other concerns related to Texas RE's purpose and operations.
