= Mini Racing Online =

MiniRacingOnline
- Designer(s): Vicente Mas Morant
- Platform(s): PC
- Release: NA: 2003; EU: 2003
- Genre(s): Racing
- Mode(s): Single-player, multiplayer

MiniRacingOnline is a freeware game designed by Vicente Mas Morant, a.k.a. "Kotai", in 2003, mainly as a Formula One racing game. The game was inspired by a speed test at the Circuit Ricardo Tormo in Cheste, Valencia.

== Cars ==
There are several vehicles some of which can be downloaded on the MRO website. These cars vary from NASCAR to Formula 1. when you first load the game you have a F1 car pack already loaded plus a MRO F1 car. You can create your own vehicles using an external image editing program (Adobe Photoshop, GIMP, etc.)Cars come with SKINS which determine the AI of the cars behavior and characteristics this can also be created and like the cars before it can be uploaded onto the website.

== Tracks ==
There are 6 ranks that organize all the tracks. They are General, F1 (Formula 1), Micro, Karting, NASCAR, and Rally. Each rank explains itself, but there has been previous issues to what general and micro tracks are. The General rank is the rank that has all the tracks that don't fit with the other ranks. Micro tracks are tracks that most people use for local [multiplayer] plays. Tracks can also be created with external image editing programs, and you use the in-game "Track Editor" to apply different land physics, like mud, sand, and of course, tarmac.

=== Features ===
Miniracingonline has many versions and features. Most of these features are heavily influenced by Formula 1 rules and any rule changes that occur over the years. For example, the game features a KERS(Kinetic Energy Recovery System) feature for all F1 cars as a result of KERS being introduced in the 2009 season of the Formula 1 championship. Other features of the game include qualifying, practice, race and time trial mode. And recent versions include DRS (Drag reduction system). Miniracingonline also consists of local multiplayer and online multiplayer.

=== Local Multiplayer ===
You can create more than one profile so you can play locally with a friend on one computer. Micro tracks have been said to be best for this mode, but there is an option you can set called "Extended Resolution" to see the bit larger tracks better.

=== Global Multiplayer ===
Global Multiplayer mode is the most popular mode in the game, as said by many players. There can be 2-32 drivers, or pilots, at once at a race. You can also set up championships using this mode.
