= Mr. O =

- Genre: Children's television
- Presented by: David Ouchterlony
- Voices of: Len Davidson; Pegi Loder
- Country of origin: Canada
- Original language: English
- No. of seasons: 2

Production
- Producers: Bruce Attridge; Rena Elmer
- Running time: 15 minutes

Original release
- Network: CBC Television
- Release: 5 April 1956 – 4 July 1957

Related
- Let's Make Music

Mr. O is a Canadian children's music television program that aired on CBC Television from 1956 to 1957.

== Premise ==
This series on classical music was hosted by David Ouchterlony, with soprano Manley Stark. It was geared towards children aged between five and eight, compared to Ouchterlony's previous series Let's Make Music which was geared towards older children. Episodes featured puppet characters operated by John and Linda Keogh such as Cellini (a cello), Clarence (a clarinet) and Whisper. The characters were voiced by Len Davidson and Pegi Loder. Games, stories and songs were also featured on Mr. O.

== Scheduling ==
This 15-minute series was broadcast Thursdays at 4:30 p.m. (Eastern) from 5 April to 21 June 1956. It was then broadcast for a full season on Thursdays at 5:15 p.m. from 4 October 1956 to 4 July 1957.
