= Southwest Power Pool =

Regional transmission organization in Central US

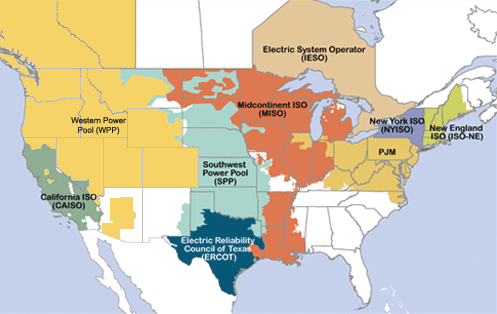
ISOs and RTOs of North America, 2024

Southwest Power Pool (SPP) is a regional transmission organization that manages the electric grid and wholesale power market for much of the central United States. The nonprofit corporation is mandated by the Federal Energy Regulatory Commission to ensure reliable supplies of power, adequate transmission infrastructure and competitive wholesale electricity prices. Southwest Power Pool and its member companies coordinate the flow of electricity across approximately 60,000 miles of high-voltage transmission lines spanning 17 states. The company is headquartered in Little Rock, Arkansas.

== History ==
SPP's story began in the early days of WWII, when America was ramping up production of weapons and military supplies. After entering the War, America needed to produce aluminum for aircraft manufacture. Alcoa and Reynolds Metals Company established themselves in Arkansas, which had the largest commercially exploitable bauxite deposit at that time. In 1941, government agency Defense Plant Corporation opened a plant in Jones Mill, Arkansas, with the intent of operating 24/7 to supply the war effort. The government leased the plant to Alcoa for operations.

The Jones Mill Plant alone required 120 megawatts (MW) of electrical power to operate. This exceeded the state's entire generation of 100 MW at peak, excluding outages. Due to the war effort, there was not enough manpower or raw materials to build further electrical generation. Executives of Southwest power utilities decided to pool their generation resources together to ensure the region's reliability and dependability during wartime. The existence of Southwest Power Pool was out of necessity and scarcity. After the war, executives saw the expertise and efficiency that was created and decided to remain a power pool.

Southwest Power Pool, Inc. was formed Dec. 14, 1941, with 11 regional utilities entering into an inter-company agreement. The 11 companies were Arkansas Power & Light, Louisiana Power & Light, and Mississippi Power & Light (subsidiaries of Entergy), Southwestern Gas and Electric and Public Service Company of Oklahoma (now subsidiaries of American Electric Power), Nebraska Power, Texas Power & Light, Southern Light and Power, Oklahoma Gas and Electric, Kansas Gas and Electric, and Empire District Electric.

Here are some other notable events in SPP’s history:

1968 - Became NERC Regional Council

1980 - Implemented telecommunications network

1991 - Implemented operating reserve sharing

1994 - Incorporated as nonprofit

1997 - Implemented reliability coordination

1998 - Implemented tariff administration

2004 - Became FERC-approved Regional Transmission Organization

2007 - Launched EIS market

2009 - Integrated Nebraska utilities

2010 - FERC approved Highway/Byway cost allocation methodology and Integrated Transmission Planning Process

2012 - Moved to new Corporate Center

2014 - Launched Integrated Marketplace Became regional balancing authority

2015 - Integrated System joins SPP

2018 - regional entity operation dissolved

2019 - Launched western reliability coordination services

2021 - Western Energy Imbalance Services (WEIS) market starts

2026 - Service territory expansions within/into MT/WY/NE/CO/UT/AZ

== Members and company status ==
SPP was incorporated as a nonprofit corporation in 1994 and was approved as a Regional Transmission Organization (RTO) by the Federal Energy Regulatory Commission (FERC) in 2004.

The SPP RTO service territory lies within the Eastern Interconnection, and as of 2026 added the Western Interconnection, in the central Southern United States, serving all of the states of Kansas and Oklahoma, and portions of New Mexico, Texas, Arkansas, Louisiana, Missouri, South Dakota, North Dakota, Montana, Minnesota, Iowa, Wyoming, and Nebraska. Added in 2026: Expansions in Montana, Wyoming, Nebraska and New Mexico, and new territory in Colorado, Utah, and Arizona. SPP members include investor-owned utilities, municipal systems, generation and transmission cooperatives, state authorities, independent power producers, and power marketers. SPP has many of the high voltage direct current (DC) ties. which connect the Eastern interconnection to the Western Interconnection and both of the DC ties to ERCOT Texas Interconnection.

SPP also added reliability coordinator services in the Western Interconnection as of 2019 in Colorado, New Mexico, Wyoming, Arizona, Montana, and Utah. SPP is developing an Energy Imbalance Service Market in the West as well.
