= SERC Reliability Corporation =

Regional electric energy reliability organization

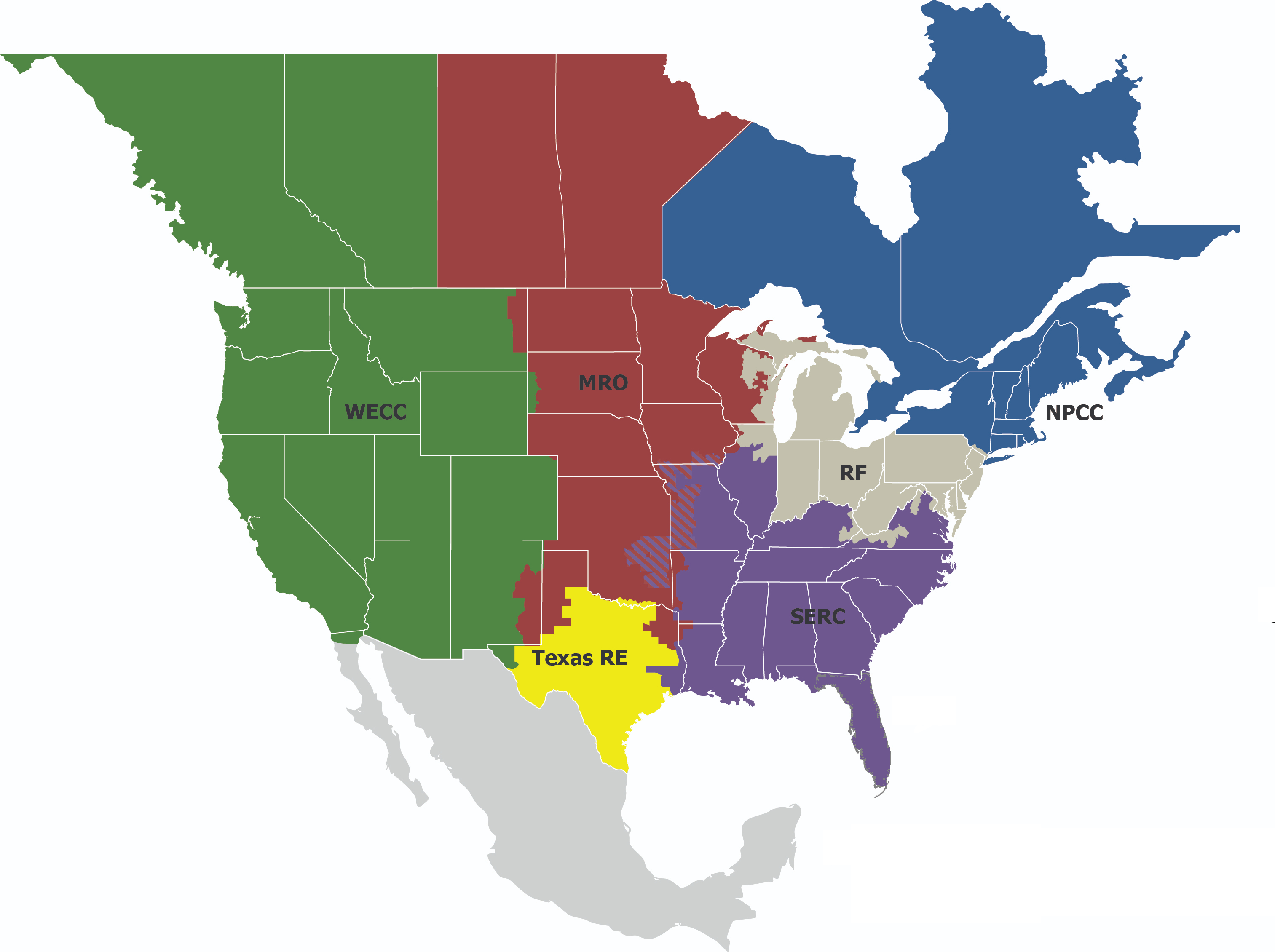
The six regional entities (2021).

SERC Reliability Corporation (SERC) is responsible for ensuring a reliable and secure electric grid across 16 southeastern and central states. The SERC region lies within the Eastern Interconnection, and includes the states of Alabama, Georgia, Mississippi, Missouri, North Carolina, South Carolina, Tennessee, and portions of Arkansas, Illinois, Kentucky, Louisiana, Oklahoma, Texas, Virginia, and Florida.

SERC is a regional entity authorized to perform this important responsibility under a Federal Energy Regulatory Commission approved delegation agreement with North American Electric Reliability Corporation (NERC). SERC was originally formed on January 14, 1970 by the functional merger of four smaller regional reliability entities: the CARVA Pool, Tennessee Valley Authority (TVA), Southern Company (SOCO) and the Florida Electric Power Coordinating Group (FEPCG).

SERC's offices are located in Charlotte, North Carolina.
