= Electric Reliability Council of Texas =

Regional energy transmission organization in Texas

Electric Reliability Council of Texas, Inc. (ERCOT)

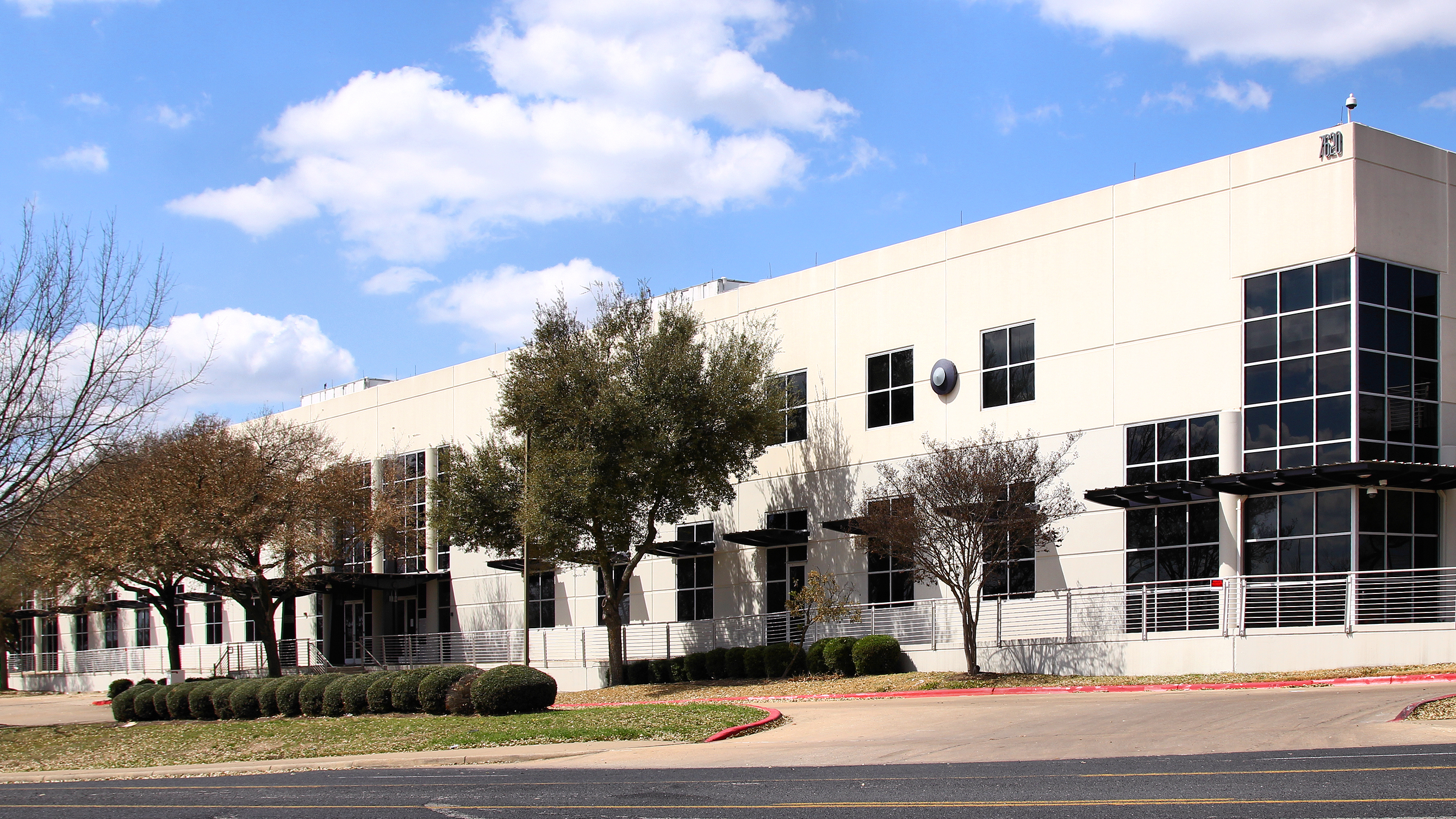
- ERCOT headquarters in Austin, Texas
- Type: 501(c)(4), charitable organization
- Tax ID no.: 74-2587416
- Headquarters: 8000 Metropolis Drive (Building E), Suite 100 Austin, Texas 78744
- Location: Taylor, Texas
- Chief Executive Officer: Pablo Vegas
- Chair, Board of Directors: Bill Flores (interim)
- Vice Chair, Board of Directors: Peggy Heeg
- Website: ercot.com

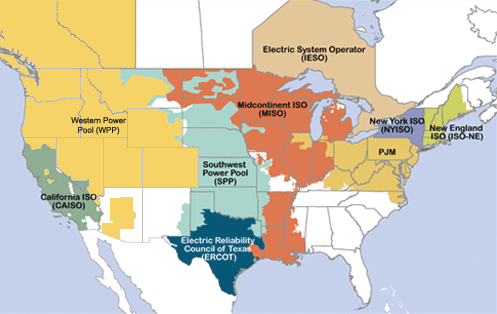
ISOs and RTOs of North America as of 2024

The Electric Reliability Council of Texas, Inc. (ERCOT) is an American organization that operates Texas's electrical grid, the Texas Interconnection, which supplies power to more than 25 million Texas customers and represents 90 percent of the state's electric load. ERCOT is the first independent system operator (ISO) in the United States. ERCOT works with the Texas Reliability Entity (TRE), one of six regional entities within the North American Electric Reliability Corporation (NERC) that coordinate to improve reliability of the bulk power grid.

As the ISO for the region, ERCOT dispatches power on an electric grid that connects more than 46,500 miles of transmission lines and more than 610 generation units. ERCOT also performs financial settlements for the competitive wholesale bulk-power market and administers retail switching for 7 million premises in competitive choice areas.

According to an ERCOT report, the major sources of generating capacity in Texas in 2020 were natural gas (51%), wind (24.8%), coal (13.4%), nuclear (4.9%), solar (3.8%), and hydroelectric or biomass-fired units (1.9%).

ERCOT is a membership-based 501(c)(4) nonprofit corporation, and its members include consumers, electric cooperatives, generators, power marketers, retail electric providers, investor-owned electric utilities (transmission and distribution providers), and municipally owned electric utilities.

Power demand in the ERCOT region is typically highest in summer, primarily due to air conditioning use in homes and businesses. The ERCOT region's all-time record peak hour occurred on July 21, 2026, when consumer demand hit 87,533 MW. The previous record was on August 20, 2024, when the demand of electricity reaches 85,931 MW. A megawatt of electricity can power about 200 Texas homes during periods of peak demand. By 2025, ERCOT had 11 GW of grid batteries, up from 2 GW in 2022.

== History ==
At the beginning of World War II, several electric utilities in Texas agreed to operate together as the Texas Interconnected System (TIS) to support the war effort. During the war, the grid was interconnected to other states and excess power generation was sent to industries on the Gulf Coast, providing a more reliable supply of electricity for production of metal and other material needed for the war.

Recognizing the reliability advantages of remaining interconnected, TIS members continued to operate and develop the interconnected grid. TIS members adopted official operating guides for their interconnected power system and established two monitoring centers within the control centers of two utilities, one in North Texas and one in South Texas.

In 1970, ERCOT was formed to comply with NERC requirements. However, the Texas grid is not subject to regulation under the Federal Power Act, being an intrastate grid for the purposes of that law. On May 4, 1976, Central Southwest Holdings attempted to force the issue, with an event that was later called the "Midnight Connection", where it connected the grid to Oklahoma for a few hours. This caused lawsuits about whether federal regulation then applied, however the judgement was that this was not sufficient.

The deregulation of the Texas electricity market occurred in two phases: the wholesale generation market in 1995 and the rest of the sector in 1999. The 1999 deregulation was aimed at counteracting a shortage of generation capacity in the state. Since deregulation, retail providers and power generators were unregulated, although regulations on transmitters continued to control the placement of electrical lines. The legislation abolished the former system, in which power was both generated and consumed locally. Instead, under the deregulated regime, retailers could contract with providers across the state, creating a complex market. The 1999 deregulation also dropped limits on rate increases. Prior to deregulation, residential electricity rates were significantly below the national average; after deregulation, residential electricity rates increased, rising 64% between 1999 and 2007.

=== 2011 winter storm power losses ===
In early February 2011, a major winter storm impacted Texas; freezing and extreme cold at natural gas pipelines and wells, as well as generating units (such as coal-fired power plants and wind turbines) caused power outages across Texas affecting 3.2 million customers. ERCOT and its regulator, the Public Utility Commission of Texas, failed to adopt a mandatory standard for preparing electricity infrastructure for such occurrences (winterization), despite recommendations from the Federal Energy Regulatory Commission and North American Electric Reliability Corporation (NERC). Texas's failure to prepare left the state vulnerable to winter-storm blackouts, including the major disaster that occurred ten years later in February 2021.

=== 2021 winter storm power losses ===
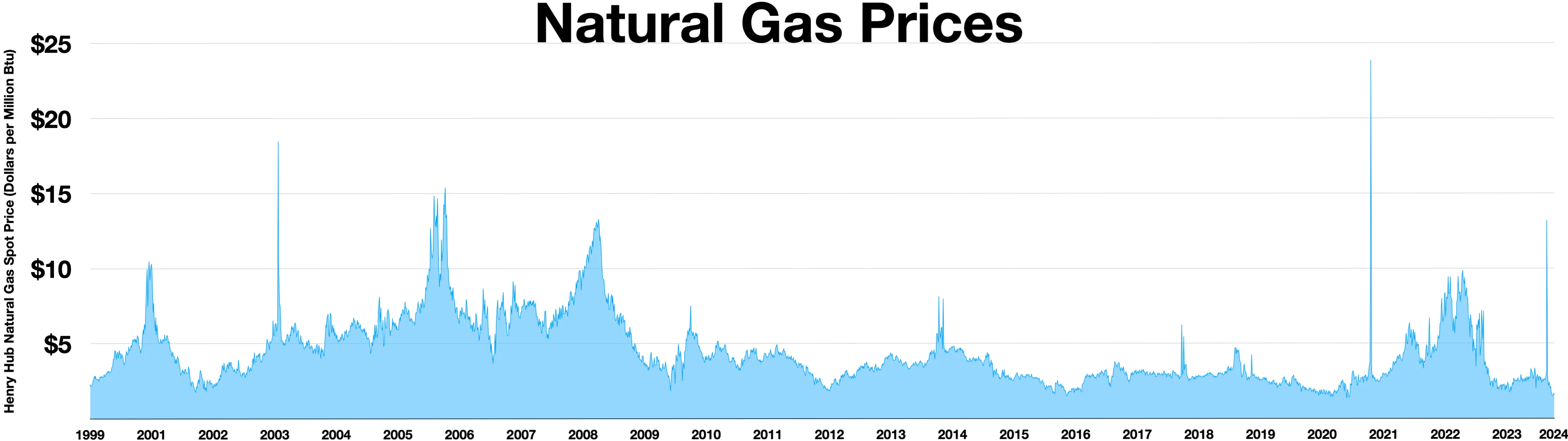
Natural gas prices spiked to $23.86 on February 17, 2021. In February 2003 there was a similar spike in natural gas prices because of shortages.

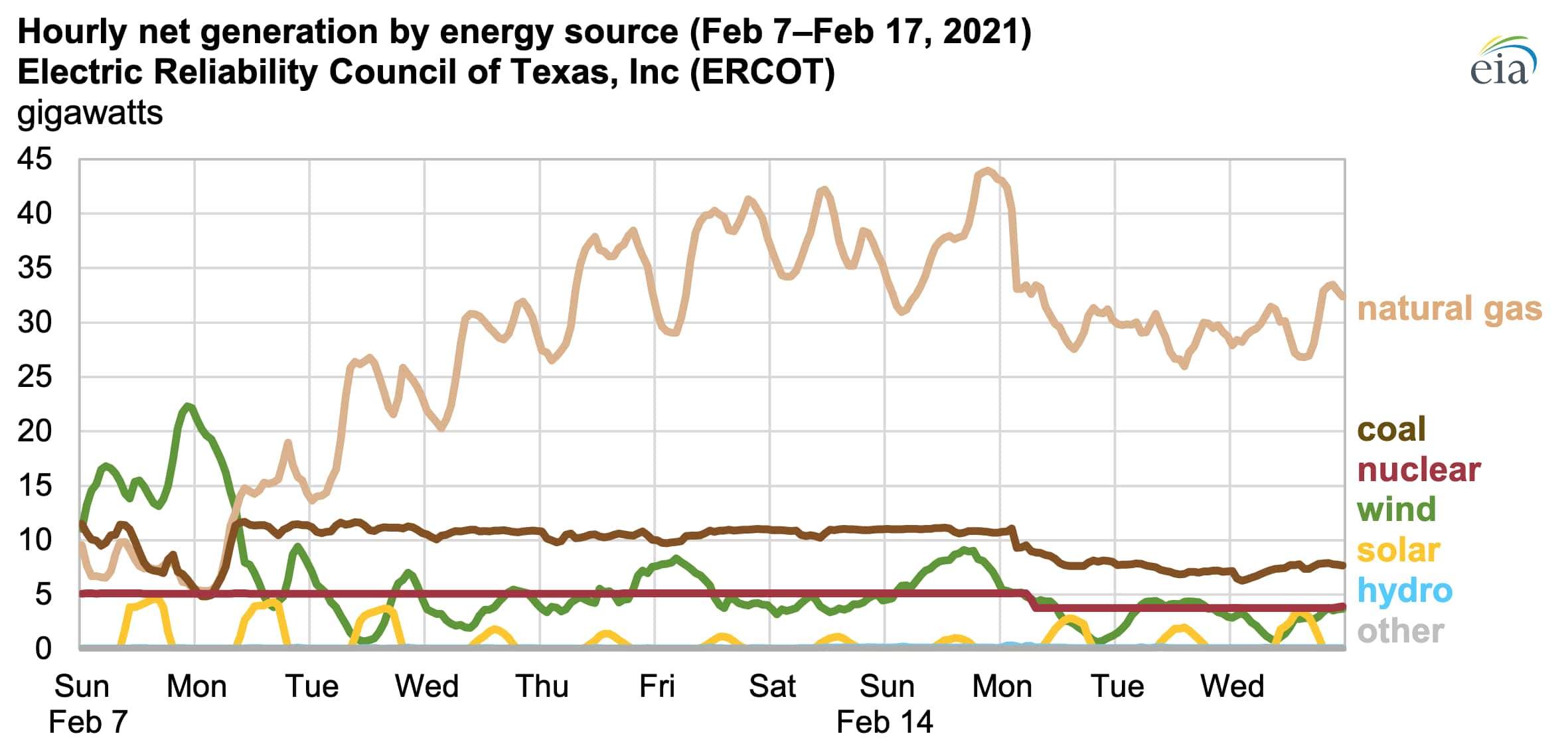
Reduced electricity from coal, nuclear, and wind power plants contributed to the shortage on February 15 and afterwards.

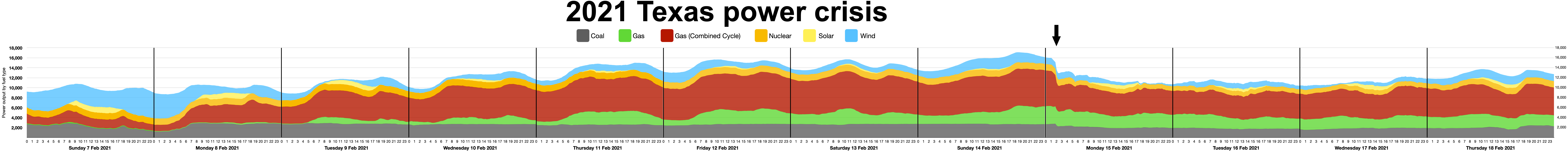
Texas Power Crisis February 2021 Wind power Solar power Nuclear power Combined cycle natural gas power Natural gas power Coal power

During a major cold-weather event in mid-February 2021, ERCOT declared a statewide emergency, due to a 34,000 MW shortfall in generation that caused widespread blackouts. At 1:25 a.m. on February 15, ERCOT began requesting blackouts from service providers. On February 16, electricity shortages caused the price of electricity to spike to over $9,000 per megawatt-hour (MWh), whereas the week before, the lowest price of power had been less than $30 per MWh. Some retail electricity providers were possibly facing huge losses or bankruptcy, and customers of Griddy reported receiving absurdly high electric bills.

Approximately 4 million customers in Texas were without electricity for various times during the multi-day storm. At first, rotating outages lasting from 10 to 40 minutes were imposed on millions of customers, but those outages lasted many hours for some and over 48 hours for others, while millions more were spared from any hardship. During the power loss, some Texans were forced to survive in record freezing temperatures down to −2 °F (−19 °C).

On February 16, Governor Greg Abbott declared that ERCOT reform would be an emergency priority for the state legislature, and there would be an investigation of the power outage to determine long-term solutions. A 357-page report had been written after the 2011 power outage in Texas, which seemed to have been ignored, because too many critical generators still lacked appropriate weatherization in 2021, especially the natural gas system.

Texans outside the ERCOT-controlled grid had a different power experience. Relatively few electric customers lost power in those regions. In counties around El Paso in western Texas, El Paso Electric reported that, as a result of it having investing millions in cold weather upgrades after the 2011 cold snap, 3,000 customers lost power for less than five minutes. In counties around Beaumont in eastern Texas, Entergy suffered relatively few outages either, because of previous winterization efforts.

The first lawsuits against ERCOT grid mismanagement were filed on February 19, 2021. On March 8, 2021, ERCOT began releasing a weekly market notice that includes entities that have paid previously identified short-pay amounts and provides an updated estimate of the aggregate outstanding short-pay amount.

On February 16, 2021, it was reported that at least 10 deaths were linked to the 2021 ERCOT grid power outages. By late March, the total number of deaths surpassed 110. A comprehensive review of news reports, death certificates, and lawsuit filings from every county in Texas led a team of journalists in Houston to set the death toll at 194, while a later review of excess deaths by journalists at BuzzFeed estimated the full true, indirect mortalities to be between 426 and 978, four to five times higher than the final toll. An 11-year-old boy, Cristian Pavon, who died of suspected hypothermia was among the deaths caused by ERCOT's grid system. Pavon's family sued Entergy Texas and ERCOT for gross negligence.

==== Accountability ====
In February 2021, seven ERCOT board members resigned in the face of significant public and political backlash over the power loss and subsequent loss of life and property, and the fact that many board members did not live in Texas:

- Sally Talberg, board chair, lived in Michigan.
- Peter Cramton, vice chair, lived in Germany.
- Terry Bulger, finance and audit chair, lived in Illinois.
- Raymond Hepper, human resources and governance Chair, lived in Maine.
- Vanessa Anesetti-Parra, market segment director, lived in Toronto, Canada.
- Clifton Karnei, a Texan, was also Executive Vice President of Brazos Electric Power Cooperative; he resigned shortly after the cooperative received a $2.1 billion bill from ERCOT and subsequently filed for bankruptcy.
- Craig Ivey, candidate for an open position, lived in Florida and withdrew his application.

Bill Magness, CEO of ERCOT, was fired on March 4, 2021, for his role in the 2021 power loss incident. The board delivered a 60-day termination notice to Magness, who had been president and CEO since 2016. The board said he would serve in those roles for the next two months.

In December 2023, the Texas Supreme Court ruled that ERCOT could not be sued for the 2021 blackouts based on the theory of sovereign immunity, raising concerns regarding accountability as it is an independent corporation and not an official state agency.

=== 2023 shift in electricity generation mix ===
In 2023, Texas's energy landscape saw significant growth in solar capacity, notably on the ERCOT grid, with solar installations, including those with storage, increasing by 35% from the previous year, leading to a reduction in midday natural gas usage. Solar generation peaked at 5.3 GWh in the summer and 3.8 GWh in the winter, while wind generation remained the largest renewable contributor at 108,000 GWh. ERCOT anticipates a substantial rise in solar capacity, with plans for 24 GW of solar and 13 GW of battery storage additions by 2025, compared to a modest 3 GW increase in both wind and natural gas capacities. ERCOT reported that energy demand on the power grid reached a record 85 gigawatts in 2023 — the hottest year recorded in Texas. In 2024, ERCOT projected that demand could reach 150 gigawatts by 2030. The increase in demand is the result of large users, including data centers and crypto currency mining operations, as well as oil and gas production that is switching from gas- and diesel-generated power to electricity.

=== Reliability efforts ===
After the 2021 outages, the state passed laws mandating weatherization of power plants against cold, streamlined emergency communications, and provided some aid for backup fuel supplies. The increase in solar generation and an increase in grid-scale power storage improve reliability, but were the result of private investments. The state has taken no action to improve energy efficiency standards, add connections to neighboring states, or regulate natural gas to ensure availability to power plants.

== Governance ==
ERCOT is governed by a board of directors and subject to oversight by the Public Utility Commission of Texas (PUC) and the Texas Legislature.

The PUC has primary jurisdiction over activities conducted by ERCOT. Three PUC commissioners, including the chair, are appointed by the governor of Texas.

The ERCOT organization is governed by a board of directors made up of independent members, consumers and representatives from each of ERCOT's electric market segments.

The Technical Advisory Committee (TAC) makes policy recommendations to the ERCOT Board of Directors. The TAC is assisted by five standing subcommittees as well as numerous workgroups and task forces.

The ERCOT board appoints ERCOT's officers to direct and manage ERCOT's day-to-day operations, accompanied by a team of executives and managers responsible for critical components of ERCOT's operation.

During the February 2021 storm, it emerged that a third of ERCOT's board of directors lived outside of Texas: Chairperson Sally A. Talberg lived in Michigan, Vice-Chair Peter Cramton lived in California and worked for universities in Germany and Maryland, and three board members lived in Toronto, Illinois, and Maine respectively. This revelation drew considerable anger from the public as well as elected representatives, and the board members' names and photographs were temporarily removed from the ERCOT website due to death threats. The board was also criticized for its meeting days before the storm: though the meeting lasted more than two hours, the members spent less than a minute discussing storm preparations and readiness. On February 23, ERCOT announced the resignation of the five out-of-state board members effective the end of the board meeting the following day. In October 2021, El Paso billionaire Paul Foster became the new Chairperson even though El Paso is not part of the Texas power grid. The other open positions were filled afterwards. Foster resigned in June 2024.

=== Organizational affairs ===
It has a headquarters in Austin and an additional complex in Taylor.

== See also ==
- Deregulation of the Texas electricity market
- List of power stations in Texas
- Energy in Texas

Related Energy Entities

- Energy Information Administration (EIA)
- Federal Energy Regulatory Commission (FERC)
- North American Electric Reliability Corporation (NERC)
- Public Utility Commission of Texas (PUCT)
- Texas Reliability Entity (Texas RE)
