= Western Electricity Coordinating Council =

Regional electric energy reliability organization

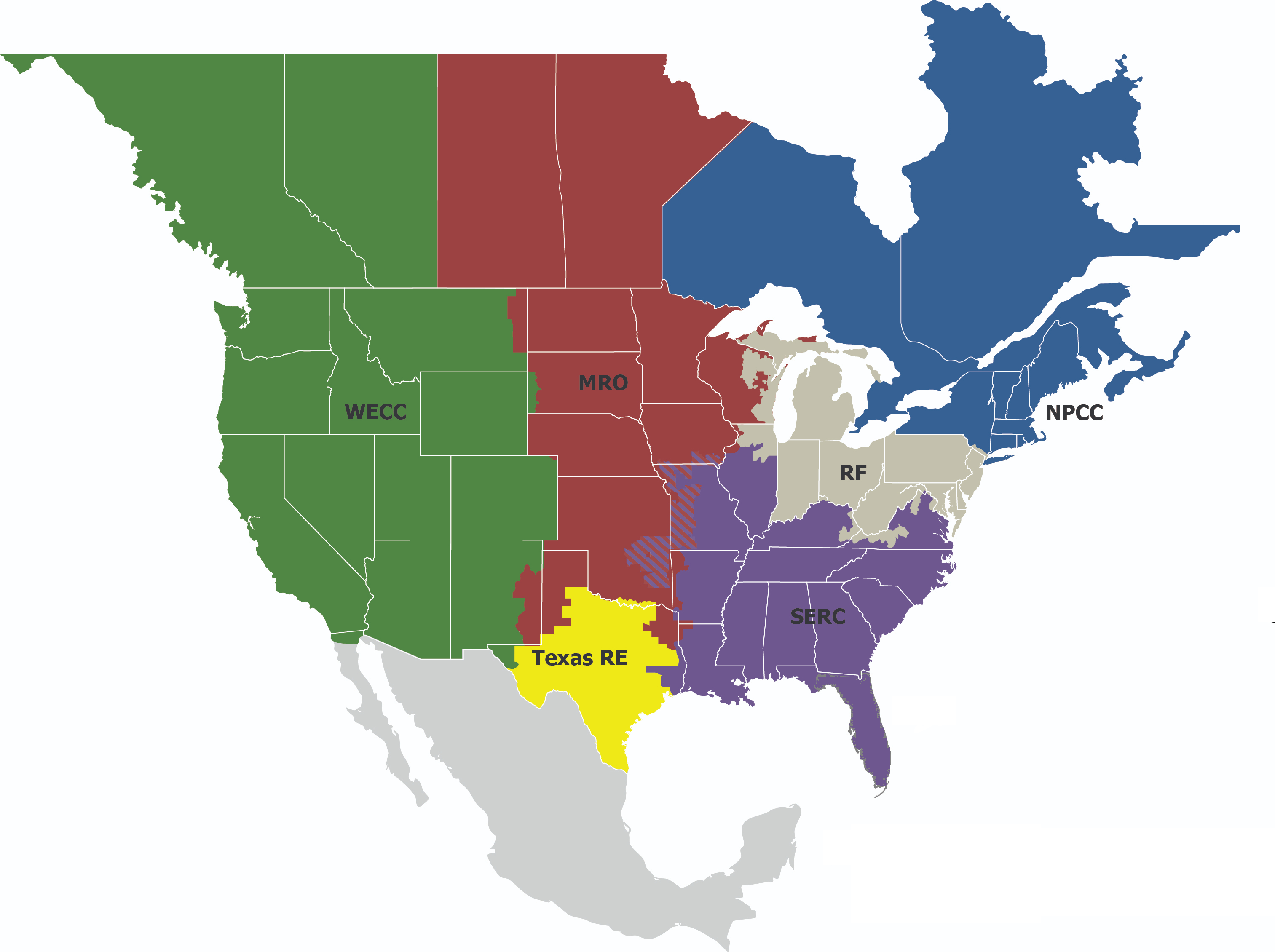
Six regional entities (2021)

The Western Electricity Coordinating Council (WECC) oversees Bulk Electric System (BES) reliability for the entire Western Interconnection system in North America. WECC is the regional entity responsible for managing coordinating planning and operations, connecting generators and loads across an area of nearly 1,800,000 square miles (4,700,000 km^{2}). In addition, WECC provides an environment for the development of Reliability Standards and the coordination of the operating and planning activities of its members as set forth in the WECC Bylaws.

WECC is geographically the largest and most diverse of the six Regional Entities with delegated authority from the North American Electric Reliability Corporation (NERC) and Federal Energy Regulatory Commission (FERC). The WECC Region extends from Canada to Mexico and includes the provinces of Alberta and British Columbia, the northern portion of Baja California, Mexico, and all or portions of the 14 Western states between.

Membership in WECC is open to all entities who meet the qualifications in the WECC Bylaws. WECC strives for transparency and open participation in all of its meetings and processes.

WECC has a long history of assuring reliability in the West that began when it was originally formed in 1967 by 40 power systems, then known as the Western Systems Coordinating Council (WSCC). Thirty-five years later in 2002, the WSCC became WECC when three regional transmission associations merged. WECC was designated a Regional Entity for the Western Interconnection in 2007 after NERC delegated some of the authority it had received from FERC to create, monitor and enforce reliability standards.

Today, WECC is an independent organization that works with entities across the West to further the common theme of electrical grid reliability. Through its various reliability-related activities, WECC provides critical support to the Reliability Coordinators and the resource owners/operators throughout the Western Interconnection. One of WECC's functions is coordinating high voltage intertie paths throughout the region.
