= North American Electric Reliability Corporation =

Non profit Electric Reliability Organization

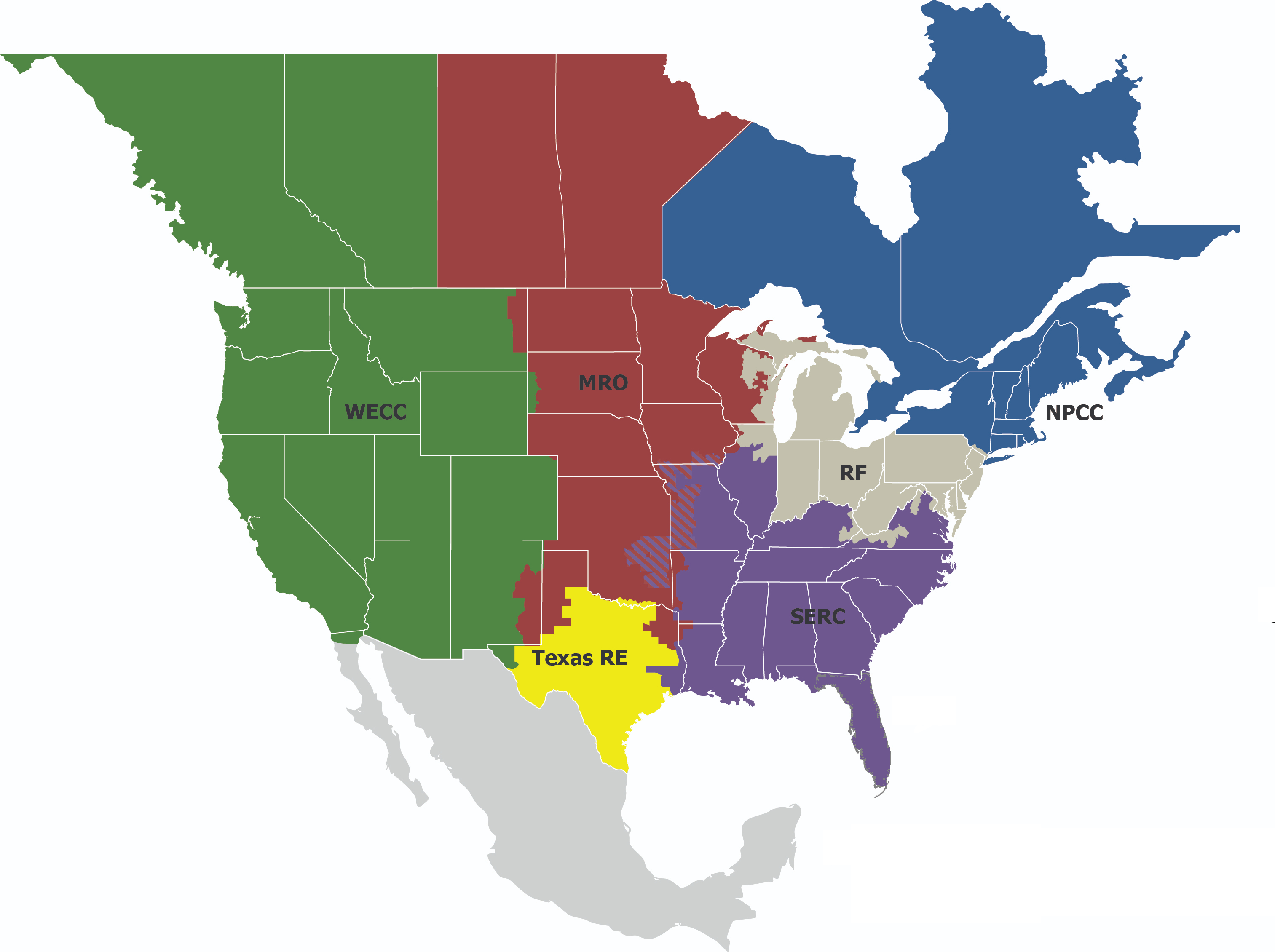
- The six Regional Entities (2021)
- Abbreviation: NERC
- Formation: March 28, 2006
- Founded at: Princeton, New Jersey
- Type: Not-for-profit organization
- Tax ID no.: 20-4821888
- Legal status: 501(c)(6)
- Headquarters: Washington, D.C., U.S.
- Coordinates: 33.847404°N 84.366719°W
- Region served: Contiguous United States, Canada and a portion of Baja California in Mexico
- Members: 1,900+ (2025)
- President & CEO: Jim Robb
- Senior Vice President: Mark Lauby
- Sr. VP, CFO, & Treasurer: (Vacant)
- Sr. VP & CSO: Michael Ball
- Board of directors: Roy Thilly (Chair); Janice B. Case (Vice Chair); Jim Robb; Robert G. Clarke; Kenneth W. DeFontes Jr.; Frederick W. Gorbet; David Goulding; George S. Hawkins; Suzanne Keenan; Robin E. Manning; Jan Schori; Colleen Sidford
- Subsidiaries: Northeast Power Coordinating Council (NPCC); Midwest Reliability Organization (MRO); SERC Reliability Corporation (SERC); ReliabilityFirst (RF); Texas Reliability Entity (Texas RE); Western Electricity Coordinating Council (WECC)
- Budget: ▲$66.6 million (2015)
- Staff: 198 (2015)
- Website: www.nerc.com
- Formerly called: North American Electric Reliability Council

The North American Electric Reliability Corporation (NERC) is a not-for-profit, international regulatory authority based in Washington, D.C., and formed on March 28, 2006, as the successor to the North American Electric Reliability Council (also known as NERC). The original NERC was formed on June 1, 1968, by the electric utility industry to promote the reliability and adequacy of bulk power transmission in the electric utility systems of North America. NERC's mission "is to assure the effective and efficient reduction of risks to the reliability and security of the grid".

NERC oversees six regional reliability entities and encompasses all of the interconnected power systems of Canada and the contiguous United States, as well as a portion of the Mexican state of Baja California.

NERC's major responsibilities include working with all stakeholders to develop standards for power system operation, monitoring and enforcing compliance with those standards, assessing resource adequacy, and providing educational and training resources as part of an accreditation program to ensure power system operators remain qualified and proficient. NERC also investigates and analyzes the causes of significant power system disturbances in order to help prevent future events.

NERC's standards for generating resources require that sufficient generating capacity be provided such that customers will need to be disconnected less often than once every ten years. These standards are mandatory for only some of the regional entities.

== Origins ==
Originally formed as a voluntary organization in 1968 by the electricity industry and called the National Electric Reliability Council, the name was changed to include "North American" in place of "National" in 1981 in recognition of Canada's participation and the broader scope of NERC's footprint. The name was changed from "Council" to "Corporation" in 2007.

In 2000, NERC established the Electricity Sector Information Sharing and Analysis Center, which provides industry with timely responses and alerts on cyber and physical security threats that have the potential to impact the bulk power system. The ES-ISAC, which changed its name in 2015 to Electricity Information Sharing and Analysis Center, shares timely information with industry through its secure web portal.

In August 2003, North America experienced its worst blackout to date, as 50 million people lost power in the Northeastern and Midwestern United States and Ontario, Canada. A United States–Canada Power System Outage Task Force was formed to investigate the causes of the blackout and to make recommendations to prevent future blackouts.

The Energy Policy Act of 2005 (US) called for the creation of an Electric Reliability Organization (ERO) to develop and enforce compliance with mandatory reliability standards in the United States. This non-governmental, "self-regulatory organization" was created in recognition of the interconnected and international nature of the bulk power grid.

In April 2006, NERC applied for and was granted the designation of the ERO by FERC in July 2006. NERC also filed the first set of mandatory Reliability Standards with FERC, as well as filing the same information with the Canadian provincial authorities in Alberta, British Columbia, Manitoba, New Brunswick, Nova Scotia, Ontario, Quebec, Saskatchewan, and with the National Energy Board of Canada.

== About NERC ==
=== Electricity Information Sharing and Analysis Center ===
NERC also operates the Electricity Information Sharing and Analysis Center (E-ISAC). E-ISAC offers security services to bulk power system owners and operators across North America. E-ISAC services includes specific cyber and physical security threat intelligence, tailored cyber security knowledge and physical security collaboration. The E-ISAC, which NERC established at the request of the U.S. Department of Energy, works closely with NERC's Bulk Power System Awareness team in Atlanta to monitor real-time cyber and physical security threats to the grid.

The E-ISAC, through capabilities including its Cybersecurity Risk Information Sharing Program (CRISP), works with critical asset owners and operators to analyze real-time cyber and physical security data for patterns of incidents with the potential to affect the bulk power system. NERC has a "firewall" separating the E-ISAC and NERC's compliance and enforcement activities. The separation extends to a physical separation of the E-ISAC from the rest of NERC.

=== Interconnections and regional entities ===
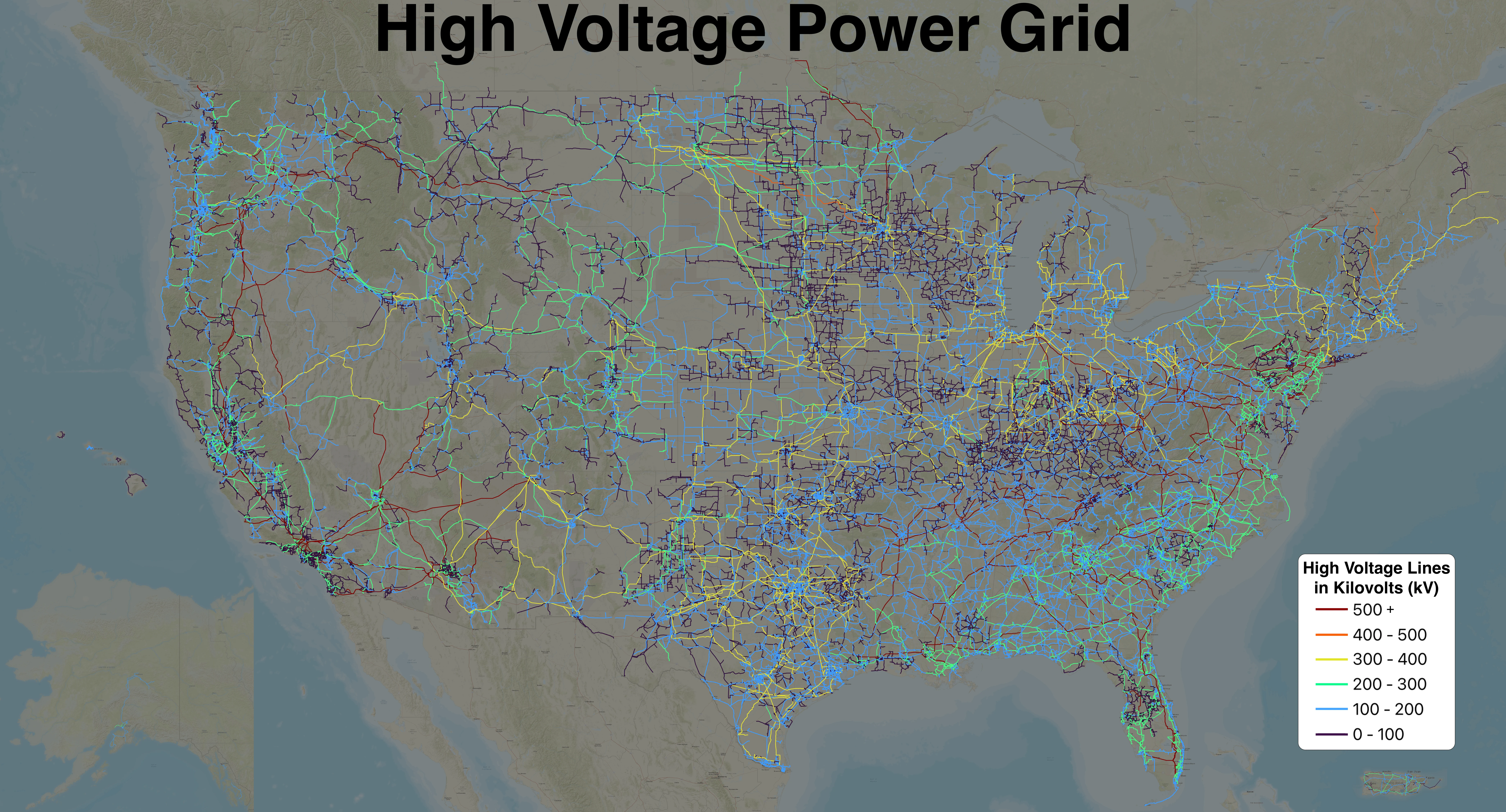
High voltage power grid in kilovolts (kV) 500+ 400-500 300-400 200-300 100-200 <100

==== Interconnections ====
- The Eastern Interconnection covers most of eastern North America, extending from the Great Plains to the Atlantic seaboard, excluding most of Texas. The Eastern Interconnection is tied to the Western Interconnection via high voltage DC transmission facilities and also has ties to non-NERC systems in northern Canada.
- The Western Interconnection covers most of western North America, from the Rocky Mountains to the Pacific coast. It is tied to the Eastern Interconnection at six points, and also has ties to non-NERC systems in northern Canada and Northwestern Mexico.
- The Texas Interconnection covers most of the state of Texas. It is tied to the Eastern Interconnection at two points, and also has ties to non-NERC systems in Mexico.
- The Quebec Interconnection covers the province of Quebec and is tied to the Eastern Interconnection. About one third of Canada's installed power (42 GW out of 130) and about one third of Canada's production (184 TWh out of 567) are in this interconnection. Despite being a functionally separate interconnection, the Quebec Interconnection is often considered to be part of the Eastern Interconnection.

==== Regional entities ====
- Midwest Reliability Organization (MRO)
- Northeast Power Coordinating Council (NPCC)
- ReliabilityFirst (RF)
- SERC Reliability Corporation (SERC)
- Texas Reliability Entity (Texas RE)
- Western Electricity Coordinating Council (WECC)

=== NERC authority ===
As part of the fallout of the Northeast Blackout of 2003, the Energy Policy Act of 2005 authorized the Federal Energy Regulatory Commission (FERC) to designate a national Electric Reliability Organization (ERO). On July 20, 2006, FERC issued an order certifying NERC as the ERO for the United States.

In September 2018, the Federal Energy Regulatory Commission (FERC) and NERC opened a joint investigation into a "winter load event" earlier in January that stressed the electrical grids in the Midwest. On January 17, Midwest and U.S. south central grid operators ordered emergency appeals for electricity conservation. This was due to high power demand caused by cold weather.

== See also ==
- Critical infrastructure protection
- Energy Policy Act of 2005
- List of major power outages
- North American power transmission grid
