= Peter Lake =

American businessman

Senior Director of Power for the White House National Energy Dominance Council
- In office 2025–2026
- President: Donald Trump
- Preceded by: Position established
- Succeeded by: Nick Elliot

Chairman of the Public Utility Commission of Texas
- In office 2021–2023
- Governor: Greg Abbott
- Preceded by: DeAnn Walker
- Succeeded by: Thomas J. Gleeson

Chairman of the Texas Water Development Board
- In office 2018–2021
- Governor: Greg Abbott
- Preceded by: Bech Bruun
- Succeeded by: Brooke Paup

Personal details
- Education: University of Chicago; Stanford Graduate School of Business

Peter Lake is an American businessman who served as the Senior Director of Power for the White House National Energy Dominance Council from 2025 to 2026. He previously served as the chairman of the Public Utility Commission of Texas from 2021 to 2023, and as chairman of the Texas Water Development Board from 2018 to 2021.

== Early life and education ==
Originally from Tyler, Texas, Lake attended the University of Chicago and Stanford University. He earned a Bachelor of Arts in Public Policy from the University of Chicago and an MBA from Stanford's Graduate School of Business.

== Career ==
=== Early career ===
Lake began his career in the financial sector, working as a trader on the Chicago Board of Trade and the Chicago Mercantile Exchange as well as director of research at Gambit Trading. He also worked a number of private sector jobs which included director of business development at Lake Ronel Oil Co., and special projects director for private investment firm VantageCap Partners.

=== Public service ===
Lake served on the Texas Water Development Board beginning in December 2015, before becoming chairman of the board in 2018. While on the board, he oversaw the implementation of a Senate Bill that established Texas' first flood infrastructure fund and statewide planning following Hurricane Harvey. It also financed billions of dollars in water infrastructure projects through the State Water Implementation Fund for Texas program and State Revolving Funds. This included the construction of the Lower Bois d'Arc Creek Reservoir which was the first reservoir to be built in Texas in 30 years.

In April 2021, Governor Greg Abbott appointed Lake as chairman of the Public Utility Commission of Texas, following the resignation of DeAnn Walker from the position. The appointment came in the aftermath of the 2021 Texas power crisis.

As PUC chairman, Lake was tasked with rebuilding stakeholder trust and increasing transparency. He initiated several public work sessions to drive grid reforms and oversaw the creation of the agency's Office of Public Engagement. He also worked closely with the Texas Legislature to implement changes, playing a key role in executing Senate Bill 3, which overhauled the state's power grid.

Lake implemented several significant reforms, including new winterization requirements for power plants and fuel sources, and oversaw changes to the grid operations of the Electric Reliability Council of Texas (ERCOT) to increase reliability. He also led the development of the "performance credit mechanism," a first-of-its-kind proposal designed to incentivize power generators to be available during peak periods. He also "pushed through a market change proposal designed to create an additional way for gas-fueled power plant generators to make money, hoping to spur construction of more power plants".

During Lake's tenure, the state experienced no system-wide blackouts despite facing periods of record-breaking electricity demand. Lake resigned from the position in June 2023 but remained on the board as a commissioner through the following month. In 2025, Lake was appointed Senior Director of Power for the White House's National Energy Dominance Council.
