= Garrett Morris (politician) =

American public official (1915–2007)

Chairman of the Public Utility Commission of Texas
- In office 1975–1978
- Governor: Dolph Briscoe
- Preceded by: Position established
- Succeeded by: George Cowden

William Garrett Morris (July 9, 1915 – April 9, 2007) was a Texas lawyer who served as the first chairman of the Public Utility Commission of Texas from 1975 to 1978.

== Early life, education, and career ==
Born in Nocona, Texas, to a family of farmers, Morris was raised in Jacksboro, Texas, and received a bachelor's degree from California State University, Fresno, in 1939. He then entered the University of Texas School of Law in Austin, from which he received his law degree in 1942, and where he became interested in politics.

Morris established a private civil law practice in Fort Worth in 1942. He served as the first city attorney of Hurst, Texas, following the city’s incorporation in 1952. A committed Democrat, Morris became a member of the Texas State Democratic Executive Committee and managed successful campaigns for Governors Connally and Briscoe, as well as for U.S. Senator Lloyd Bentsen during the 1960s and 1970s.

== Public service ==
Governor John Connally named Morris to the Texas Highway Department and twice appointed him to the Texas Department of Public Safety Commission. Governor Dolph Briscoe appointed him to the State Public Welfare Board, and in August 1975, named Morris to chair the newly established Public Utility Commission of Texas, along with George Cowden and Alan Erwin. Morris was unanimously confirmed by the Texas Senate for each of his appointments.

== Personal life and death ==
On July 3, 1943, Morris married Elizabeth Ann Wright, whom he met while attending law school, and with whom he had a daughter and a son.

Morris died from congestive heart failure at his home, at the age of 91.
