= Moak =

Moak is a surname. Notable people with the surname include:

- Lee Moak (born 1957), American aviation safety expert
- Paul Moak (born 1979), American producer, engineer, mixer, and multi-instrumentalist
- Robert Moak (born 1958), American politician and attorney
- Scott Moak (fl. 2000s–2020s), American public address announcer
- Summer Moak (born 1999), American racing cyclist

== See also ==
- Moak Rollins (1921–2005), American businessman, educator, and government official
- Te-Moak Tribe of Western Shoshone Indians of Nevada
- Moak Lake, Manitoba
