= NEDC =

NEDC may refer to:

- National Economic Development Council, a British economic planning body
- National Energy Dominance Council, a White House advisory body
- New European Driving Cycle
