= Richard Goldberg (advisor) =

American politician

Director for Countering Iranian Weapons of Mass Destruction for the White House National Security Council
- In office 2019–2020
- President: Donald Trump

Personal details
- Education: Northwestern University

Richard Goldberg is an American politician and former military officer who served as Director for Countering Iranian Weapons of Mass Destruction for the White House National Security Council (NSC) from 2019 to 2020. Goldberg currently serves as a senior advisor at the Foundation for Defense of Democracies (FDD), and chairman of the Defense Technology Alliance (DTA).

Described as an "Iran hawk", Goldberg was a leading advocate of sanctions on Iran and the dismantling of the 2015 Iran nuclear deal during the first Trump administration.

== Early life and education ==
Goldberg attended Northwestern University.

== Career ==
=== First Trump administration ===
Goldberg served as an aide to John Bolton. In 2019, he was appointed as a member of the National Security Council during the first Trump Administration. He resigned from the NSD in January 2020.

In January 2020, Responsible Statecraft published a report that The New York Times did not disclose Goldberg remained a salaried FDD employee while serving on the NSC after publishing an opinion written by Goldberg supporting the Trump administration's pressure campaign against Iran.

In August 2020, Goldberg was sanctioned by Iran for having participated in "economic terrorism" against Iranians as a result of his advocacy for sanctions on Iran and support for undoing the 2015 Iran nuclear deal. In a statement on Twitter, Goldberg wrote, "Today I gain a new badge of honor: ‘sanctioned’ by Iran for coordinating @realDonaldTrump's maximum pressure campaign."

=== Second Trump administration ===
In 2025, Goldberg served for a month in the second Trump Administration's National Energy Dominance Council.

=== Defense Technology Alliance ===
As of 2026, Goldberg is chairman of the Defense Technology Alliance, an initiative working to connect US defense procurment systems to Israeli weapons development.
