= DeAnn Walker =

Chairman of the Public Utility Commission of Texas
- In office 2017–2021
- Governor: Greg Abbott
- Preceded by: Donna L. Nelson
- Succeeded by: Peter Lake

Personal details
- Born: DeAnn Thomason
- Education: Southern Methodist University (B.A.); South Texas College of Law Houston (J.D.)

DeAnn Thomason Walker was a chairman of the Public Utility Commission of Texas from 2017 to 2021, when she resigned following criticism of the commission's response to the 2021 Texas power crisis.

== Biography ==
The daughter of artist Ronald Thomason of Fort Worth, Texas, Walker received a B.A. from Southern Methodist University and her J.D. from the South Texas College of Law Houston in 1987, and gained admission to the bar in Texas later that year. Her professional career included roles at CenterPoint Energy, where she worked as Associate General Counsel and Director of Regulatory Affairs. She thereafter served as Senior Policy Advisor to Governor Greg Abbott on regulated industries. In September 2017, Abbott appointed Walker to the Public Utility Commission of Texas, to a term set to expire in September 2021.

Walker's tenure as PUC chair ended following the catastrophic failure of the Texas power grid during the February 2021 winter storm, which left millions without power. The crisis led to severe public criticism and legislative scrutiny. During hearings, Walker was accused of deflecting responsibility to the Electric Reliability Council of Texas (ERCOT) and others, which led to calls for her resignation from state officials, including Lieutenant Governor Dan Patrick. Walker resigned shortly afterward, stating it was in the state's best interest and urging other entities involved in the crisis to take responsibility as well. She was succeeded in office by the appointment of Peter Lake.

During a bankruptcy trial related to the fallout from the 2021 winter storm, U.S. Bankruptcy Judge David Jones judge harshly criticized Walker for her contradictory testimony regarding the Commission's handling of the crisis, ultimately dismissing her from the stand.
