= Griddy (company) =

American energy distributor

- Company type: Private
- Industry: Energy
- Website: griddy.com

Griddy was an American power retailer that formerly sold energy to people in the state of Texas at wholesale prices for a $9.99 monthly membership fee and had approximately 29,000 members. The company itself was based in California.

== History ==
Griddy LLC was incorporated in 2016 in Delaware, but physically located in Playa Vista, California. Some investment was taken from EDF Trading in 2019.

In December 2020, new leadership was appointed. Michael Fallquist (Chief Executive Officer), Christian McArthur (Chief Operating Officer) and Roop Bhullar (Chief Financial Officer) were appointed and an agreement with Macquarie Energy was entered into. All three new appointments had previously worked at Crius Energy (acquired by TXU Energy in 2019).

=== 2021 Texas power crisis ===
During the February 2021 Texas power crisis, some Griddy customers who signed up for the wholesale variable rate plans allowed by the Texas deregulated electricity market found themselves facing bills of over $5,000 for five days of service during the storm. Griddy received media attention for urging its customers to leave the company.

At the time, the Electric Reliability Council of Texas (ERCOT) capped the wholesale price of electricity at $9,000 per megawatt-hour, which translates to $9 per kilowatt-hour. Customers had previously seen the wholesale rates hit that high in August 2019, but only for a 90-minute period, which the company then noted was an unprecedentedly long time at that price. During the February 2021 storm, wholesale rates, and therefore Griddy's rates, were at the maximum for about four days. Griddy advised customers to remove themselves from their system during the storm, and says that over 9,700 accounts did by February 15. On February 17, they asked for PUC approval to switch the remaining customers to a traditional energy provider, but the PUC, which was overwhelmed by the situation, was unable to discuss the matter. Griddy's 29,000 customers were charged $29 million during the storm. On February 15, during the power crisis, the state's Public Utility Commission required ERCOT to set the price to the $9,000 maximum. The commission reasoned that the trading prices for energy - as low as $1,200 - were inconsistent with the supply scarcity.

In the week after the storm, one Chambers County customer filed a proposed class action lawsuit against Griddy, alleging price gouging and seeking $1 billion in relief.

Griddy's billing practice was to withdraw money from linked customer financial accounts as charges accrued. Nevertheless, many customers owed money. After the storm, Griddy offered five-month payment plans to customers who owed outstanding balances, but also prohibited customers with outstanding balances from switching to another provider.

On February 26, ERCOT ejected Griddy from the Texas market for nonpayment. Griddy's approximately 10,100 customers were switched to other electricity providers.

The Texas Attorney General filed suit on March 1, charging Griddy with false and misleading practices. The company filed for Chapter 11 bankruptcy (debt restructuring) on March 15, 2021.

In August 2021, Griddy settled the false and misleading practices suit filed by the state of Texas, agreeing to wipe out the debts still owed by its customers. Customers who had paid Griddy could file for refunds.
