= Disabled Power =

2025 book by Angela Frederick

Disabled Power: A Storm, A Grid, and Embodied Harm in the Age of Disaster
- Cover of the 2025 NYU Press edition
- Authors: Angela Frederick
- Language: English
- Subjects: Sociology
- Publisher: NYU Press
- Publication date: 2025
- Publication place: USA
- Media type: Print (hardcover, Paperback)
- Pages: 272
- Awards: Society for Social Studies of Science Rachel Carson Prize (2026); ASA Body & Embodiment Section Best Book Award (2026); ASA Disibility in Society Socialogy of Disability in Society Outstanding Publication Award (2026); ASA Medical Sociology Section Donald W. Light Book Award for Applied or Public Practice of Medical Sociology (2026); National Hurricane Conference Allan Clive Service and Spirit Memorial Award (2026)
- ISBN: 978-1-47-982814-2

Disabled Power: A Storm, A Grid, and Embodied Harm in the Age of Disaster is a 2025 book by the sociologist Angela Frederick, published by NYU Press. The book addresses the experiences of people with disabilities living in Texas during the 2021 Texas power crisis, a major power crisis during three winter storms in February 2021. The book received the 2026 Rachel Carson Prize from the Society for Social Studies of Science.

== Reception ==
Mohammad Newaz Sharif, writing in the Natural Hazards Review, said that the book "is a major contribution to disaster studies, disability studies, environmental sociology, and publicpolicy scholarship". Newaz Sharif praised the book's "critique of the vulnerability/capacity binary" as "one of the book's strongest theoretical contributions". Newaz Sharif wrote that "Frederick demonstrates that infrastructure failuresare never simply technical breakdowns; they are political out-comes that distribute risk and protection unevenly across society".

Adrianna Munson, reviewing for Social Forces, said that "Frederick skillfully demonstrates why disability should be centered in social science research, not simply because disabled people are part of our communities and deserve representation, but because their experience yields important generalist insight for the field." Munson said that the book "shows the concrete effects of corporate greed, climate change, and exclusion on people’s bodies".

Adam Briggle, reviewing the book in Issues in Science and Technology, said that Frederick "brings disaster studies and disability studies together to offer an account that is valuable both for its theoretical framing as well as its rich narrative form".

The award committee for the Society for Social Studies of Science Rachel Carson Prize said that "The book fulfills the mission of Rachel Carson’s legacy: it takes a harm that institutions have rendered invisible and makes it publicly undeniable". The committee made the award by unanimous decision, stating that the book "artfully and originally demonstrates the core STS lesson that systems become visible in moments of breakdown".

=== Awards ===
- Society for Social Studies of Science Rachel Carson Prize (2026).
- ASA Body & Embodiment Section Best Book Award (2026).
- ASA Disability in Society Sociology of Disability in Society Outstanding Publication Award (2026).
- ASA Medical Sociology Section Donald W. Light Book Award for Applied or Public Practice of Medical Sociology (2026).
- National Hurricane Conference Allan Clive Service and Spirit Memorial Award (2026).
