= H. Tati Santiesteban =

American Democratic politician (1934–2020)

Member of the Texas Senate from the 29th district
- In office January 9, 1973 – January 8, 1991
- Preceded by: Joe Christie
- Succeeded by: Peggy Rosson

Member of the Texas House of Representatives from district 67-1
- In office January 10, 1967 – January 9, 1973
- Preceded by: District created
- Succeeded by: District abolished

Personal details
- Born: Humberto Tati Santiesteban; November 3, 1934 El Paso, Texas, U.S.
- Died: October 29, 2020 (aged 85) El Paso, Texas, U.S.
- Party: Democratic

Humberto Tati Santiesteban (November 3, 1934 – October 29, 2020) was an American politician from Texas.

== Early life and education ==
Santiesteban was born in El Paso, Texas, and went to New Mexico Military Institute. He served in the United States Army and was commissioned a first lieutenant. He attended the University of Texas School of Law.

== Career ==
Santiesteban practiced law in El Paso. He served in the Texas House of Representatives from district 67-1 from 1967 to 1973 and in the Texas Senate from the 29th district from 1973 to 1991, when he was defeated in the Democratic primary in a bid for reelection to an additional term.

== Death ==
Santiesteban died from COVID-19 in El Paso, on October 29, 2020, at age 85, during the COVID-19 pandemic in Texas.
