= Peggy Rosson =

American Democratic politician (born 1935)

Member of the Texas Senate from the 29th district
- In office January 9, 1991 – January 8, 1997
- Preceded by: H. Tati Santiesteban
- Succeeded by: Eliot Shapleigh

Chairman of the Public Utility Commission of Texas
- In office 1985–1987
- Governor: Mark White
- Preceded by: Philip Ricketts
- Succeeded by: Dennis Thomas

Personal details
- Born: Margaret Ann Mulry; April 11, 1935 Indianapolis, Indiana, U.S.
- Party: Democratic

Margaret Ann "Peggy" Rosson (née Mulry; born April 11, 1935) was an American politician. She was a chairman of the Public Utility Commission of Texas from 1985 to 1987, and later served in the Texas Senate from 1991 to 1997.

== Early life, education, and career ==
Born in Indianapolis, Indiana, Rosson graduated from George Washington High School in Indianapolis in 1952, and moved to El Paso, Texas, in 1954, "where she worked as a paralegal and businesswoman before launching a career in public service that earned her accolades from environmentalists, consumer advocates, and women across Texas". She worked for a time as a paralegal, from which she retired in 1977, and later as a director of the Bank of the West in El Paso. One source noted that "Rosson spent 25 years as a legal secretary and paralegal before making utility regulation a full-time volunteer job".

== Public Utility Commission of Texas ==
In 1983, Governor Mark White appointed Rosson to the Public Utility Commission of Texas, making her the first women to serve on the commission. Appointed alongside Alan Erwin to two vacant seats on the commission, at the time, Rosson was "praised by consumer advocates for her knowledge of utility regulation", and had been "fighting increases in El Paso electric rates for almost five years". In 1985, she was elected chair of the commission by her fellow members, but in February 1987, she was ousted from the chairmanship of the commission by the other two members, with whom she had publicly disagreed on a number of matters in the preceding months. She resigned from the commission later that year, and from 1987 to 1991, she "applied her expertise in utilities to representing the Office of the Attorney General on the State Cogeneration Council".

== Texas Senate ==
In 1990, Rosson ran for a seat in the Texas Senate, defeating long-serving incumbent state senator H. Tati Santiesteban in the Democratic primary, and then going on to win over 68% of the vote against her Republican opponent in the general election. Serving in Texas Senate, District 29, she was the first women elected to represent El Paso in the Texas Senate. She made clear during her campaign that she did not intend to restrict her role in the senate to the public utility issues for which she was known.

She was reelected in 1992. She was reelected again in the subsequent election, and retired from the state senate in 1997. While in office, she defended both gun ownership rights and abortion rights.
