= Philip Ricketts =

American lawyer and chairman (1945–2018)

Chairman of the Public Utility Commission of Texas
- In office 1984–1985
- Governor: Mark White
- Preceded by: Alan Erwin
- Succeeded by: Peggy Rosson

Personal details
- Born: October 5, 1945 Gatesville, Texas, U.S.
- Died: November 2, 2018 (aged 73) Austin, Texas, U.S.
- Spouse: Nancy Overman
- Children: 1
- Occupation: Lawyer, government official

Philip Franks Ricketts (October 5, 1945 – November 2, 2018) was an American lawyer who served as chairman of the Public Utility Commission of Texas (PUC) from 1984 to 1985.

== Early life, education, and military service ==
Born in Gatesville, Texas, Ricketts received his undergraduate degree from Baylor University, attending on scholarship, thereafter serving in the United States Army for two years as a military intelligence officer during the Vietnam War. Ricketts received his law degree from the University of Texas School of Law, and gained admission to the bar in Texas in 1973. For a time, he was an attorney for Texas Rural Legal Aid, for example in cases in 1974 and 1975 representing Mexican-American students born in Texas, who sought to attend local schools there although their legal guardians remained in Mexico.

== Public Utilities Commission and later life ==
When the Public Utility Commission was created by the state legislature in 1975, Ricketts was appointed as its Chief Administrative Law Judge. In that capacity, Ricketts ruled in 1977 that Gulf States Utility Co. could begin supplying power to College Station, Texas, over the objections of the city of Bryan, Texas. In 1982, under Governor Bill Clements, he became an assistant attorney general, serving as the Texas Attorney General's Chief of the Utility Section.

In January 1983, Ricketts became incoming Governor Mark White's assistant general counsel, and in March 1983, Governor White appointed Ricketts as a commissioner of the PUC. In August 1984, Ricketts was elected by his two fellow commissioners to serve as chair, following the resignation of commissioner Alan Erwin.

Ricketts resigned from the PUC as of October 7, 1985, in order to return to private practice with a law firm of Bracewell & Patterson in Austin, having previously informed Governor White "that he did not want to be reappointed to the commission". Ricketts remained with the firm until his death, and practiced energy and telecommunications law.

== Personal life and death ==
In December 1972, Ricketts married law school classmate Nancy Overman, with whom he had one son. He died in Austin at the age of 73.
