= George Cowden =

American politician (1930–2025)

Chairman of the Public Utility Commission of Texas
- In office 1978–1982
- Governor: Dolph Briscoe; Bill Clements
- Preceded by: Garrett Morris
- Succeeded by: Moak Rollins

Personal details
- Born: December 29, 1930 San Antonio, Texas, U.S.
- Died: December 20, 2025 (aged 94)

George Malcolm Cowden (December 29, 1930 – December 20, 2025) was an American lawyer and politician who served in the Texas House of Representatives from 1963 to 1967, and was the second chairman of the Public Utility Commission of Texas from 1978 to 1982.

== Early life, education and military service ==
Born in San Antonio, Cowden "spent early years raising cattle and doing ranch work on the 21,500-acre spread his father ran near Pearsall". After graduating from Pearsall High School in 1948, Cowden enrolled in John Tarleton Agricultural College in Stephenville, Texas, but "after one semester Cowden changed his mind and transferred to Baylor University", from which he received a B.A. in 1953.

Cowden then joined the United States Air Force as a lieutenant, during which time he "commanded a squadron based in Japan, a job usually held by a major". After serving for two years in the Air Force, he returned to Baylor, from which he received an LL.B. in 1959, thereafter entering the private practice of law.

== Public service ==
Cowden represented McLennan County, Texas, for two terms in the Texas House of Representatives, in the 58th Texas Legislature from January 8, 1963 to January 12, 1965, and in the 59th Texas Legislature from January 12, 1965 to December 31, 1966. He was elected to a third term in the 60th Texas Legislature in November 1966, but was never sworn in, as he instead resigned to assume the office of assistant attorney general, serving in that position under Texas Attorney General Crawford Martin, whose campaign Cowden had managed in 1966.

On January 15, 1968, Governor John Connally appointed Cowden chairman of the Texas Board of Insurance. Following the election of Governor Preston Smith later that year, Cowden left public service for a position as general counsel and senior vice president of the Great American Reserve Insurance Co. Then, in August 1975, Governor Dolph Briscoe named Cowden to the newly established Public Utility Commission of Texas, along with William Garrett Morris and Alan Erwin.

== Personal life and death ==
Cowden married Mollie Waldrop of Jackson, Tennessee, with whom he had four children. In 2012, Cowden's son Gordon was the oldest victim of the 2012 Aurora theater shooting in Aurora, Colorado.

Cowden died on December 20, 2025, at the age of 94.
