= Alan Erwin =

American PR professional (1944–2019)

Chairman of the Public Utility Commission of Texas
- In office 1983–1984
- Governor: Mark White
- Preceded by: Moak Rollins
- Succeeded by: Philip Ricketts

Alan Russell Erwin (September 4, 1944 – November 12, 2019) was a Texas public relations professional who served as chairman of the Public Utility Commission of Texas from 1983 to 1984.

== Early life, education, and career ==
Born in Greenville, Texas, Erwin received a B.A. in Communications from the University of Texas at Austin in 1967. he joined the United States Navy, eventually becoming an "advisor to the Vietnamese Navy's Swift Boat division" in 1969. In July 1969, it was reported that Erwin, then residing in Boston with his wife, would travel to Saigon towards the end of October "to work for the Joint U.S. Public Affairs Office". Erwin also worked at times as administrative assistant to Congressman Robert R. Casey, and as an assistant to the editor and publisher of The Beaumont Enterprise and Journal.

In 1973, Governor Dolph Briscoe named Erwin director of the Office of State-Federal Relations, in Washington, D.C..

== Public Utility Commission service and later life ==
In August 1975, Governor Briscoe named Erwin to the newly established Public Utility Commission of Texas, along with George Cowden and William Garrett Morris.

As one of "Gov. Briscoe's first appointed PUC commissioners", Alan received the shortest of the three appointed terms, set to expire in 1979. Erwin then returned to private practice, and in the 1982 election helped gubernatorial candidate Mark White to "draft his utility reform program", and also "filmed TV spots during White's campaign to unseat Clements", in which Erwin said that elected PUC commissioners "could help restore public confidence in regulation". After winning the election and taking office, Governor White reappointed Erwin to the PUC in 1983, along with Peggy Rosson. Erwin served as chair of the commission for the remainder of this tenure.

After leaving the commission, Erwin sought to become a novelist, publishing The Power Exchange in 1984. In January 1985, he was named to a panel that investigated water quality in the Colorado River in Texas. He worked for a time for the international public relations firm of Hill and Knowlton, announcing the opening of his own public relations firm in April 1985.

== Personal life and death ==
In December 1967, Erwin married Gay Taylor, with whom he had three sons. In 2010, Gay successfully donated a kidney to Erwin, which "defied compatibility odds of 50 million-to-one regarding organ donation between spouses". Erwin died in 2019, at the age of 75, and was interred at the Texas State Cemetery.
