= Moak Rollins =

Chairman of the Public Utility Commission of Texas
- In office 1982–1983
- Governor: Bill Clements; Mark White
- Preceded by: George Cowden
- Succeeded by: Alan Erwin

Henry Moak Rollins (September 11, 1921 – January 27, 2005) was a chairman of the Public Utility Commission of Texas from 1982 to 1983.

== Education and career ==
Born in Gulfport, Mississippi, Rollins received a B.S. in Mechanical Engineering from Texas A&M University in 1942, and thereafter served as an engineering officer and pilot in the United States Army Air Forces during World War II, stationed in Iran and Italy. His military service concluded in 1946, and he thereafter joined the Hughes Tool Company in Houston, Texas, in 1947, remaining until he left in 1951 to serve as a founding member of what would become Drilco Oil Tools. He remained with Drilco until 1967, when it was acquired by Smith International.

Rollins then left the business world to pursue a master's degree in business administration at University of Texas at Austin, followed by a doctorate in finance at the same institution, becoming a member of the faculty in 1973. Rollins was a lecturer at the University of Texas until August 1979, when Governor Bill Clements, with whom Rollins had become friends years earlier, appointed him to a seat on the Public Utility Commission.

Rollins later became chair of the PUC, and in 1983, following the election of Governor Mark White, who had campaigned in part on criticism of the PUC, Rollins found himself the target of criticism for the decisions of the commission. Rollins resigned from the PUC in March 1983, in protest against the rhetoric of Governor White, whom Rollins deemed "unprincipled and dishonest"; the other two members of the PUC having already resigned and been replaced by White, Rollins said that he was resigning in part to ensure that White was "held personally responsible" for the actions of the PUC, which would then be composed only of White's appointees.

== Personal life and death ==
On October 20, 1946, Rollins married Viola Emogene Broaddus, in Houston, Texas, with whom he had three sons. He died in Austin, Texas, at the age of 83.
