= Public Utility Commission of Texas =

Texas state agency

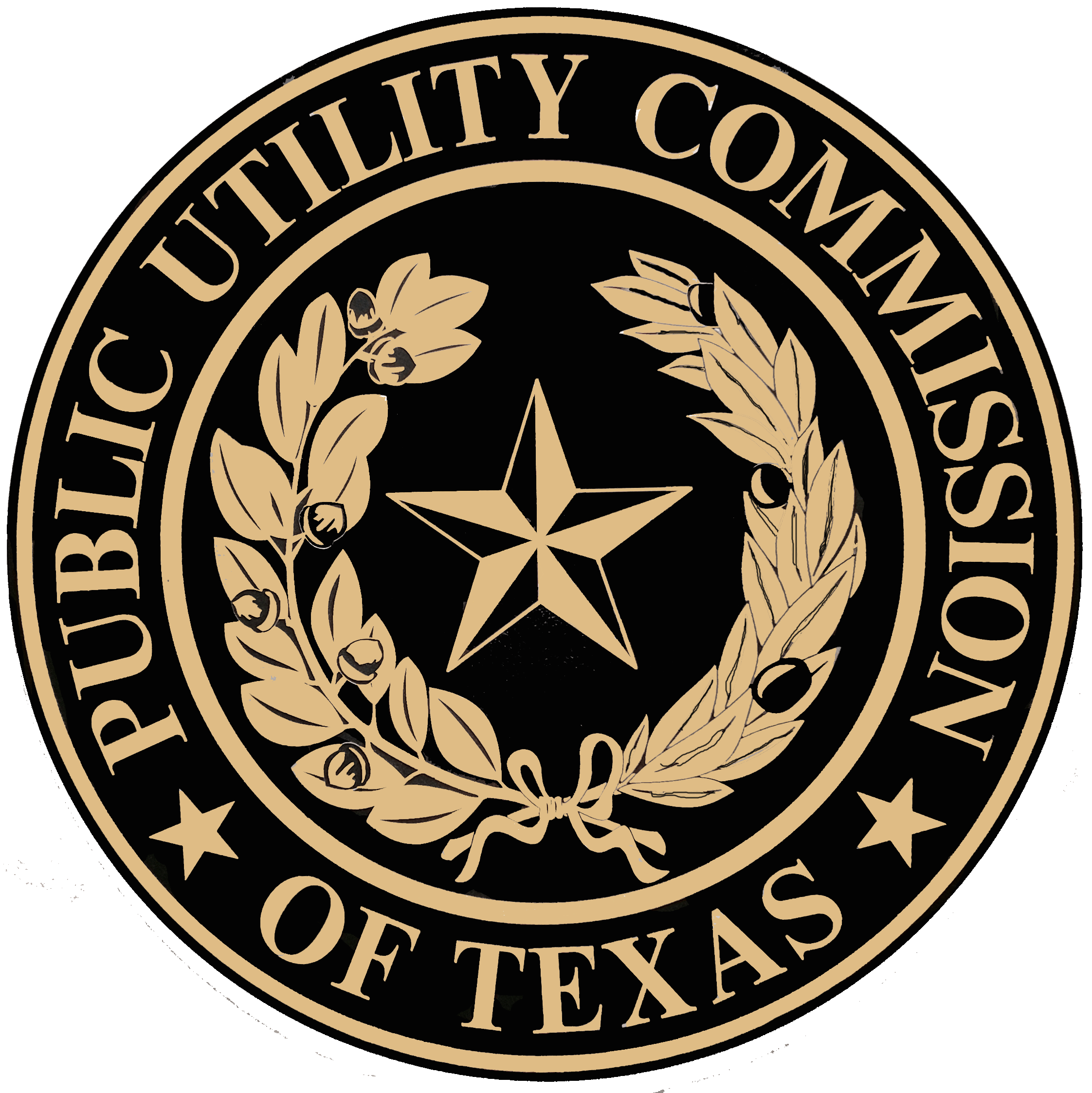
- Seal of the Public Utility Commission of Texas

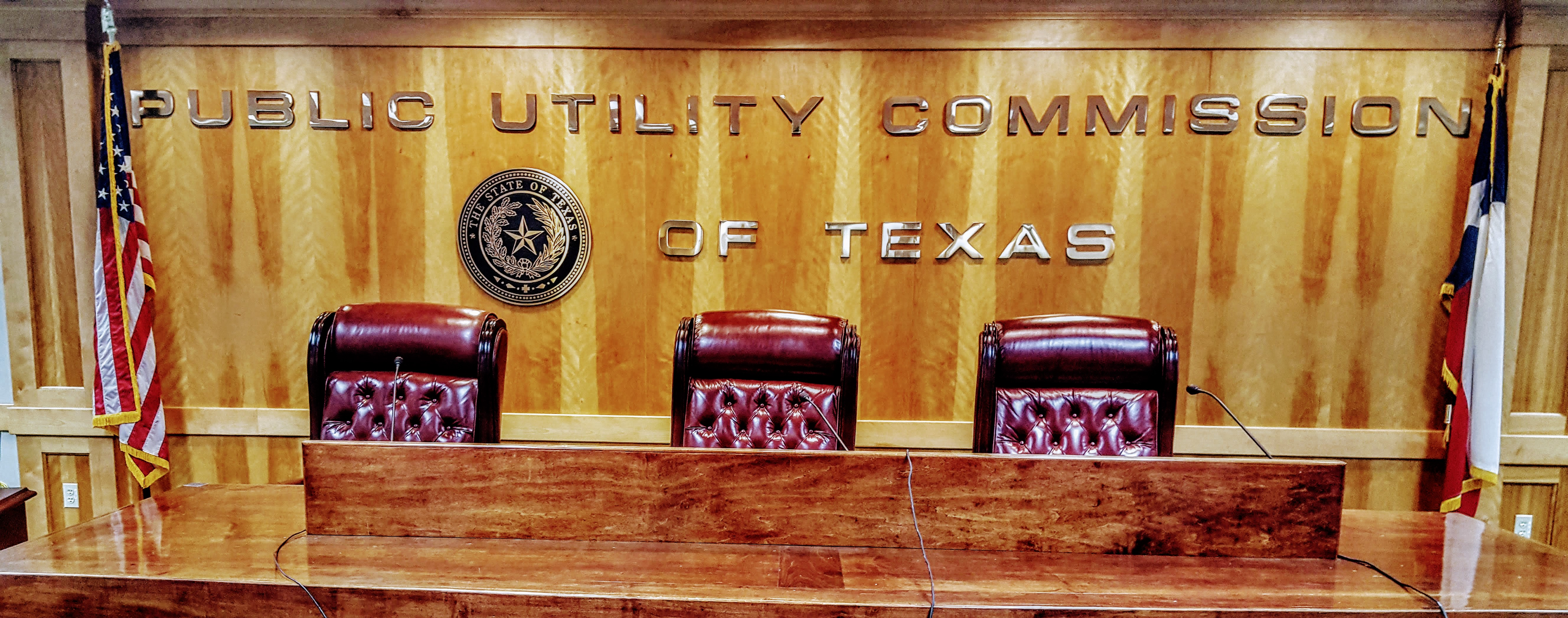
- Open meetings are held in the PUC hearing room

Agency overview
- Jurisdiction: Texas
- Headquarters: Austin, Texas, United States
- Agency executives: Thomas Gleeson, Chairman; Kathleen Jackson, Commissioner; Courtney Hjaltman, Commissioner; Morgan Johnson, Commissioner; Patrick Rhode, Commissioner; Connie Corona, Executive Director

The Public Utility Commission of Texas (PUC or PUCT) is a state agency that regulates the state’s electric, water and telecommunication utilities, implements respective legislation, and offers customer assistance in resolving consumer complaints.

== History ==
In 1975, the Texas Legislature enacted the Public Utility Regulatory Act (PURA) and created the Public Utility Commission of Texas (PUC) to provide statewide regulation of the rates and services of electric and telecommunications utilities. Roughly twenty years later, the combined effects of significant Texas legislation in 1995 and the Federal Telecommunications Act of 1996 resulted in competition in telecommunication’s wholesale and retail services and the creation of a competitive electric wholesale market. Further changes in the 1999 Texas Legislature not only called for a restructuring of the electric utility industry but also created new legislation that ensured the protection of customers' rights in the new competitive environment.

The agency is headquartered in the William B. Travis State Office Building at 1701 North Congress in Austin. In 2011, the former commission chairman, Barry Smitherman resigned to become a member of the Texas Railroad Commission, under appointment from Governor Rick Perry.

Following the February 13–17, 2021, North American winter storm, the PUC was sued by plaintiffs alleging that its actions led to a spike in electricity prices. In April 2021, in the wake of this crisis, chairman DeAnn T. Walker resigned and Governor Greg Abbott appointed Texas Water Development Board chairman Peter Lake as chairman of the Public Utility Commission of Texas. On June 14, 2024, the Supreme Court of Texas ruled that the PUC had acted within its authority as a state agency in taking emergency measures that raised the price of electricity, and was therefore immune from suit.

== Structure and function ==
Appointed by the Governor of Texas, the five-member commission also regulates the rates and services of transmission and distribution utilities that operate where there is competition, investor-owned electric utilities where competition has not been chosen, and incumbent local exchange companies that have not elected incentive regulation. The PUC's stated mission is to "protect customers, foster competition, and promote high quality infrastructure".

Over the years, various changes have dramatically re-shaped the PUC's mission and focus, shifting from up-front regulation of rates and services to oversight of competitive markets and compliance enforcement of statutes and rules. In 2013, the Texas Legislature added water utility regulation to the agency's responsibilities.

Since the introduction of competition in both the local and long distance telecommunications markets and the wholesale and retail electric markets, the PUC has also played an important role in overseeing the transition to competition and ensuring that customers receive the intended benefits of competition.

== List of former and current members ==
- Garrett Morris - Chairman, 1975 – 1978; Commissioner, 1978 – 1982
- George Cowden - Commissioner, 1975 – 1978; Chairman, 1978 – 1983
- Alan Erwin - Commissioner, 1975 – 1979; Chairman, 1983 – 1984
- Moak Rollins - Commissioner, 1979 – January 1982; Chairman, Feb 1982 – March 1983
- Tommie Smith - Commissioner, 1982 – 1983
- Philip Ricketts - Commissioner, 1983 – 1984; Chairman, 1984 – 1985
- Peggy Rosson - Commissioner, 1983 – 1985; Chairman, 1985 – 1987
- Dennis Thomas - Commissioner, 1984 – 1987; Chairman, 1987 – 1988
- William Cassin - Commissioner, 1988 – 1989
- Jo Campbell - Commissioner, 1985 – 1991
- Paul Meek - Chairman, 1989 – 1992
- Marta Greytok - Commissioner, 1987 – 1992; Chairman, 1993
- Karl R. Rábago - Commissioner, 1992 – 1995
- Sarah Goodfriend - Commissioner, 1993 – 1995
- Robert Gee - Commissioner, 1991 – 1993, 1995 – 1997; Chairman, 1994
- Pat Curran - Commissioner, 1997 – 1998
- Judy Walsh - Commissioner, July 1995 –2001
- Patrick H. Wood - Chairman, February 1995 – August 2001
- Max Yzaguirre - Chairman, June 2001 – 2002
- Brett A. Perlman - Commissioner, January 1999 – 2003
- Rebecca Klein - Commissioner, June 2001 – May 2002; Chairman, May 2002 –2004
- Paul Hudson - Commissioner, 2003; Chairman, 2004 – 2008
- Julie Caruthers Parsley - Commissioner, November 2002 – 2008
- Barry T. Smitherman - Commissioner, April 2004 – November 2007; Chairman November 2007 – 2011
- Rolando Pablos - Commissioner, September 2001 – 2013
- Donna L. Nelson - Commissioner, August 2008 – July 2011; Chairman July 2011 – August 2017
- Kenneth W. Anderson Jr. - Commissioner, September 2008 – August 2017
- Brandy Marty Marquez - Commissioner, August 2013 – 2018
- Arthur C. D'Andrea - Commissioner, November 2017 – March 2021
- DeAnn Walker - Chairman, September 2017 – March 2021
- Shelly Botkin - Commissioner, June 2018 – March 2021
- Will McAdams - Commissioner, April 2021 – December 2023
- Peter Lake - Chairman, April 2021 – June 2023
- Lori Cobos - Commissioner, June 2021 – December 2024
- Jimmy Glotfelty - Commissioner, August 2021 – December 2024
- Kathleen Jackson - Commissioner, August 2022 – present
- Thomas J. Gleeson - Chairman, January 2024 – present
- Courtney K. Hjaltman - Commissioner, June 2024 – present
- Morgan Johnson - Commissioner, October 2025 - present

== See also ==
- Electric Reliability Council of Texas
- Railroad Commission of Texas
