= National Energy Dominance Council =

U.S. advisory council on energy

- Seal of the Executive Office of the President

Agency overview
- Formed: February 14, 2025; 20 months ago
- Jurisdiction: U.S. federal government
- Headquarters: Eisenhower Executive Office Building, Washington, D.C., United States
- Agency executives: Doug Burgum, U.S. Secretary of the Interior; Chris Wright, U.S. Secretary of Energy
- Parent agency: Executive Office of the President of the United States
- Website: www.energy.gov/about-nedc

The National Energy Dominance Council (NEDC) is an advisory body in the Executive Office of the President of the United States. The NEDC was created during the second administration of Donald Trump to promote American energy independence and boost domestic oil, gas, and energy production.

== History ==
Following the 2024 United States presidential election, President-elect Donald Trump announced that his pick for U.S. Secretary of the Interior Doug Burgum would lead a new "National Energy Council" to spur energy production in the United States.

Following his inauguration, on his first day in office President Trump invoked the National Emergencies Act and declared a "national energy emergency."

On February 14, 2025, President Trump signed Executive Order 14213, which established the National Energy Dominance Council and directed it to:

- "advise the President on how best to exercise his authority to produce more energy to make America energy dominant"
- "advise the President on improving the processes for permitting, production, generation, distribution, regulation, transportation, and export of all forms of American energy, including critical minerals"
- "provide to the President a recommended National Energy Dominance Strategy to produce more energy that includes long-range goals for achieving energy dominance by cutting red tape, enhancing private sector investments across all sectors of the energy-producing economy, focusing on innovation, and seeking to eliminate longstanding, but unnecessary, regulation"
- "advise and assist the President in facilitating cooperation among the Federal Government and domestic private sector energy partners"
- "advise the President on facilitating consistency in energy production policies"

== Membership ==
The Secretary of the Interior serves as the Chair of the NEDC. The Secretary of Energy serves as Vice Chair. The NEDC consists of the following members:

- Secretary of State
- Secretary of the Treasury
- Secretary of Defense
- Attorney General
- Secretary of Agriculture
- Secretary of Commerce
- Secretary of Transportation
- Administrator of the Environmental Protection Agency
- Director of the Office of Management and Budget
- United States Trade Representative
- Deputy Chief of Staff for Policy
- Assistant to the President for Economic Policy
- Assistant to the President for National Security Affairs
- Assistant to the President for Domestic Policy
- Chairman of the Council on Environmental Quality
- Chairman of the Council of Economic Advisers
- Director of the Office of Science and Technology Policy

== Criticism ==
The American Enterprise Institute has said the council is "not particularly transparent" and that "it is not clear how choices and policy development actually happen."

== See also ==
- Coalie
- Drill, baby, drill
- Energy in the United States
- Energy policy of the United States
- Fossil fuel
- Mining in the United States
- United States energy independence
