= Hydro-Québec's electricity transmission system =

International power transmission system centred in Quebec, Canada

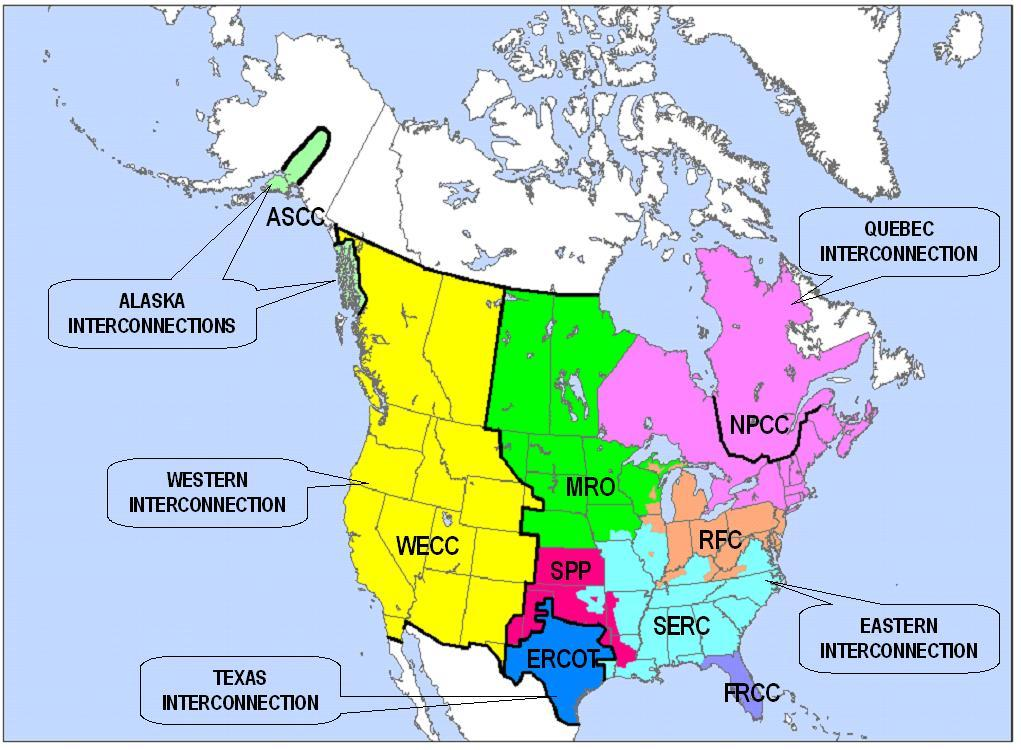
The two major and three minor NERC interconnections, and the nine NERC Regional Reliability Councils.

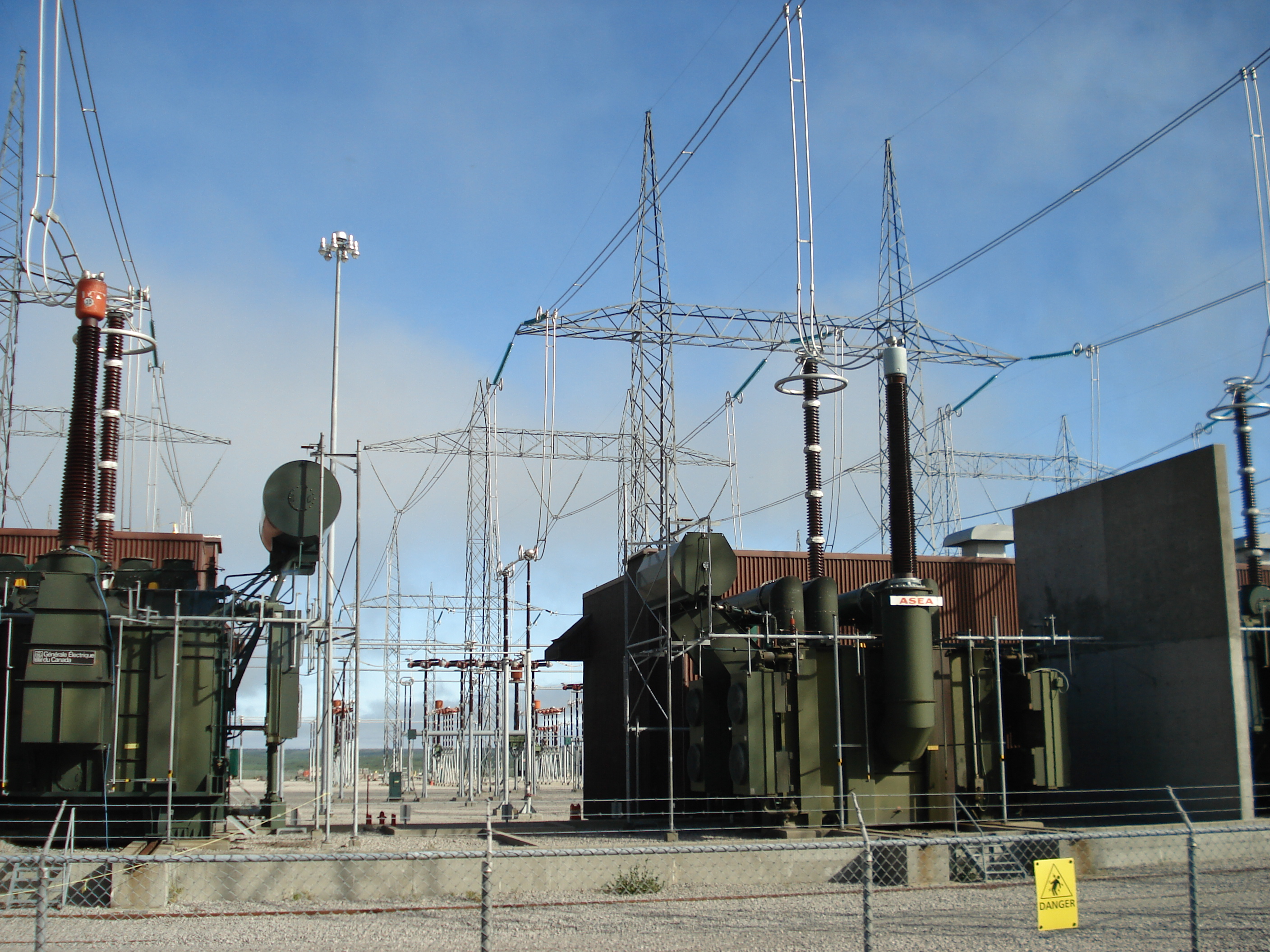
735 kV substation near the Robert-Bourassa generating station

Hydro-Québec's electricity transmission system (also known as the Quebec interconnection) is an international electric power transmission system centred in Quebec, Canada. The system pioneered the use of very high voltage 735-kilovolt (kV) alternating current (AC) power lines that link the population centres of Montreal and Quebec City to distant hydroelectric power stations like the Daniel-Johnson Dam and the James Bay Project in northwestern Quebec and the Churchill Falls Generating Station in Labrador (which is not part of the Quebec interconnection).

The system contains more than 34,187 kilometres (21,243 mi) of lines and 530 electrical substations. It is managed by Hydro-Québec TransÉnergie, a division of the crown corporation Hydro-Québec and is part of the Northeast Power Coordinating Council. It has 17 interconnectors with the systems in Ontario, Newfoundland and Labrador, New Brunswick, and the Northeastern United States, and features 6,025 megawatts (MW) of interconnector import capacity and 7,974 MW of interconnector export capacity.

Major expansion of the network began with the commissioning of the 735 kV AC power line in November 1965, as there was a need for electricity transmission over vast distances from the north to southern Quebec.

Much of Quebec's population is served by a few 735 kV power lines. This contributed to the severity of the power outage following the North American ice storm of 1998.

== History ==
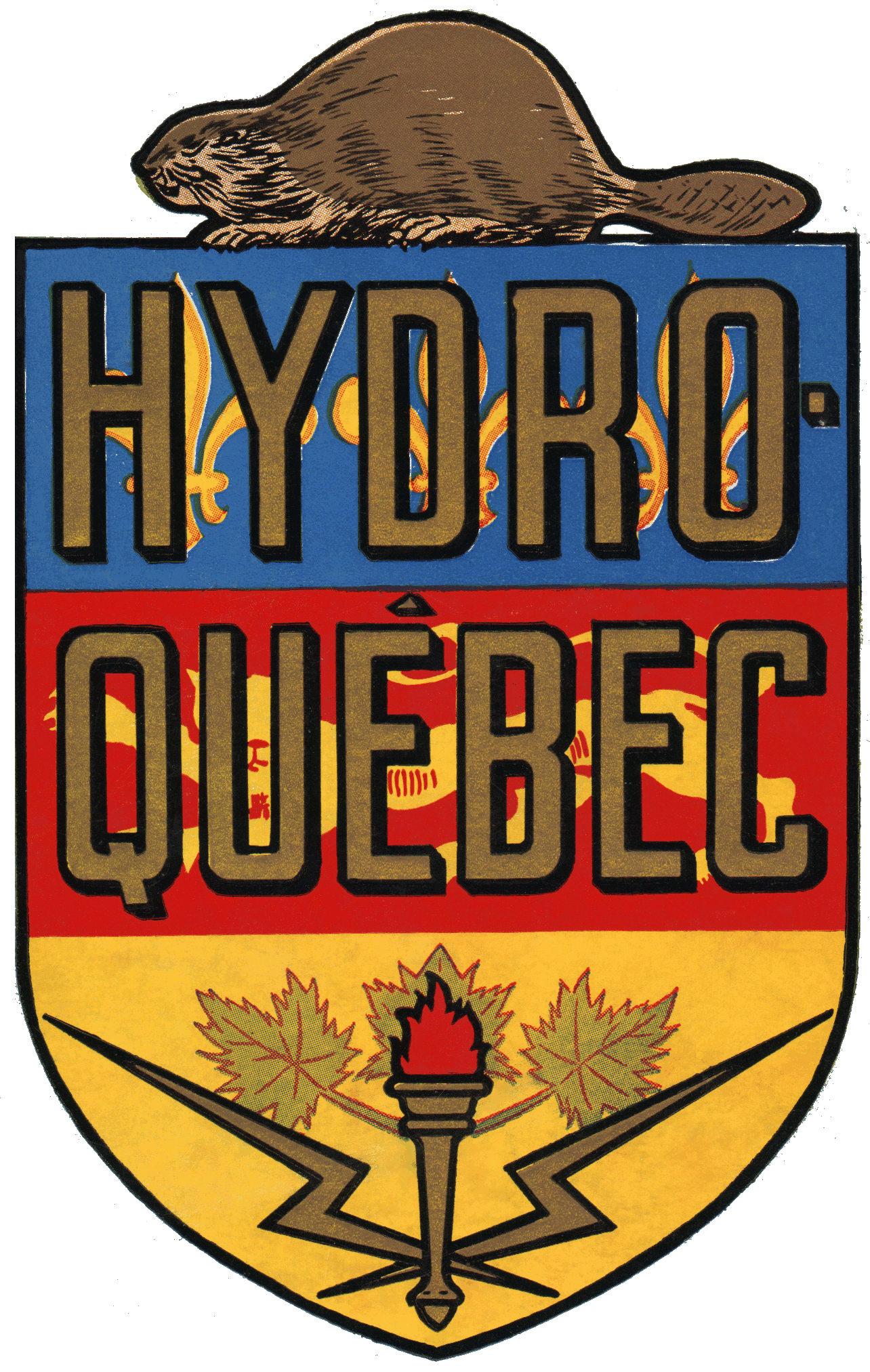
Hydro-Québec's first logo (1944–1960)

The first hydroelectric stations in Quebec were built by private entrepreneurs in the late 19th century. In 1903 the first long-distance high-voltage transmission line in North America was built, a 50 kV line connecting a Shawinigan powerstation to Montréal, 135 km (84 mi) away. In the first half of the 20th century, the market was dominated by regional monopolies, whose service was publicly criticised. In response, in 1944 the provincial government created Hydro-Quebec from the expropriated Montreal Light, Heat & Power.

In 1963 Hydro-Québec purchased the shares of nearly all remaining privately owned electrical utilities then operating in Quebec and undertook construction of the Manicouagan-Outardes hydroelectric complex. To transmit the complex's annual production of about 30 billion kWh over a distance of nearly 700 km (430 mi), Hydro-Québec had to innovate. Led by Jean-Jacques Archambault, it became the first utility in the world to transmit electricity at 735 kV, rather than 300–400 kV which was the world standard at that time. In 1962, Hydro-Québec proceeded with the construction of the first 735 kV power line in the world. The line, stretching from the Manic-Outardes dam to the Levis substation, was brought into service on 29 November 1965.

Over the next twenty years from 1965 to 1985, Quebec underwent a massive expansion of its 735 kV power grid and its hydroelectric generating capacity. Hydro-Québec Équipement, another division of Hydro-Québec, and Société d’énergie de la Baie James built these transmission lines, electrical substations, and generating stations. Constructing the transmission system for the La Grande Phase One, part of the James Bay Project, took 12,500 towers, 13 electrical substations, 10,000 kilometres (6,000 mi) of ground wire, and 60,000 kilometres (37,000 mi) of electrical conductor at a cost of C$3.1 billion alone. In less than four decades, Hydro-Québec's generating capacity went from 3,000 MW in 1963 to nearly 33,000 MW in 2002, with 25,000 MW of that power sent to population centres on 735 kV power lines.

== Source of the electricity ==
Much of the electricity generated by Hydro-Québec Generation comes from hydroelectric dams located far from load centres such as Montreal. Of the 33,000 MW of electrical power generated, over 93% of that comes from hydroelectric dams and 85% of that generation capacity comes from three hydroelectric generation centers: James Bay, Manic-Outardes, and Newfoundland and Labrador Hydro's Churchill Falls.

James Bay

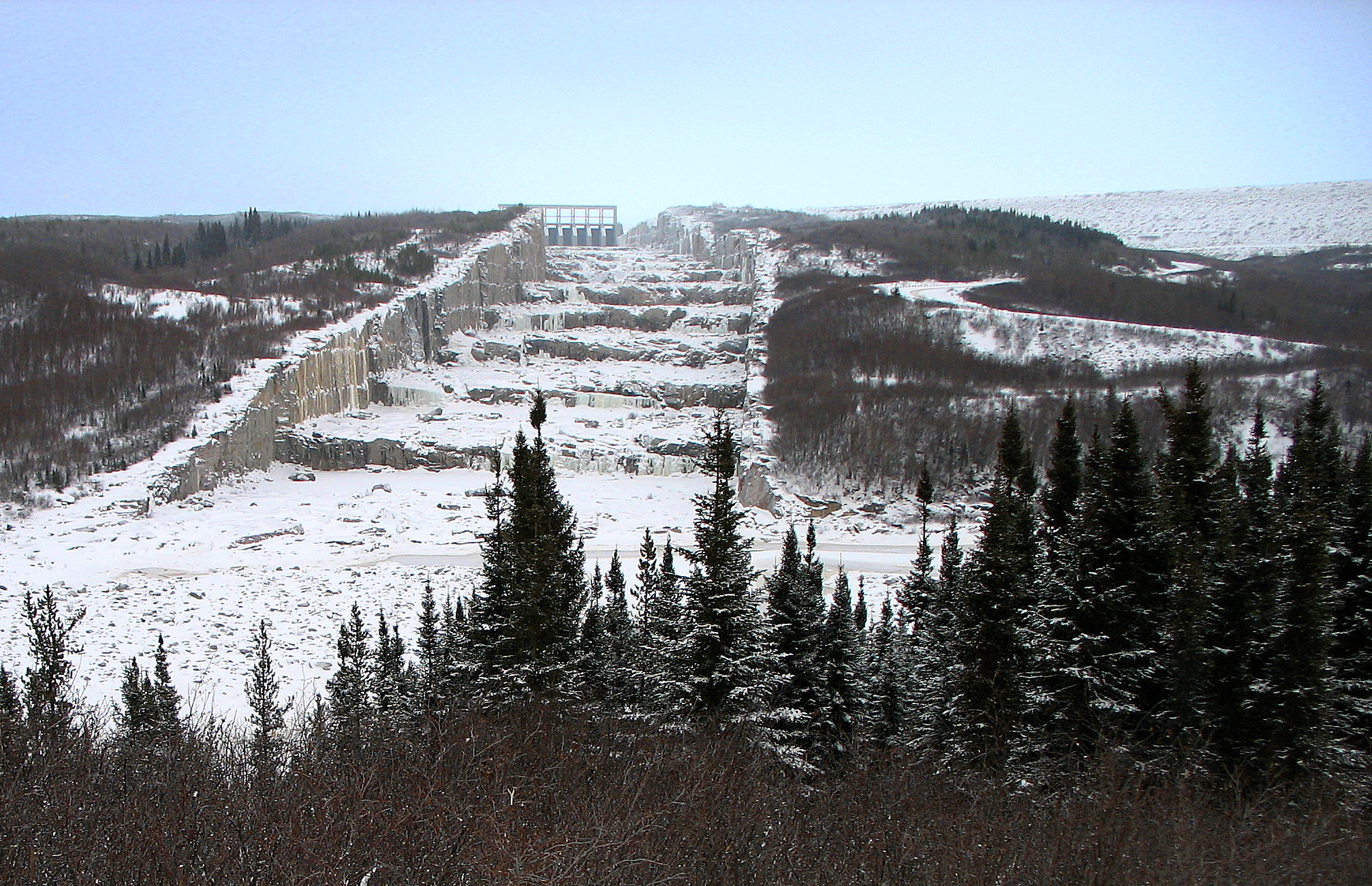
The spillway of the Robert-Bourassa Dam (formerly La Grande-2 Dam), one of many hydroelectric dams supplying power to the load centres of Montreal, Quebec City, and the Northeastern United States

The James Bay Project encompasses the La Grande project, which is located on the La Grande River and on its tributaries, such as the Eastmain River, in northwestern Quebec. The La Grande project was built in two phases; the first phase lasted twelve years from 1973 to 1985 and the second phase lasted from 1985 to present time. In all, the nine hydroelectric dams there produce over 16,500 MW of electric power, with the Robert-Bourassa or La Grande-2 station generating over 5,600 MW alone. In total, the project cost over C$20 billion to construct.

Manic-Outardes power stations

The Manic-Outardes river area in the Côte-Nord or North Shore region consists of several hydroelectric facilities located on three principal rivers, from west to east: Betsiamites River, Rivière aux Outardes, and the Manicouagan River. A single plant named Sainte-Marguerite-3 is located to the east on the Sainte-Marguerite River (Sept-Îles). The facilities located in the region were constructed over a period of five decades, from 1956 to 2005. The total generation capacity from these power stations is 10,500 MW. A 21-MW hydroelectric power station, the Lac-Robertson generating station on the Lower North Shore, is not connected to the main Quebec grid.

Churchill Falls

Churchill Falls is a single underground generation station located on the Churchill River near the town of Churchill Falls and the Smallwood Reservoir in Newfoundland and Labrador. It was constructed over a period of five to six years from 1966 to 1971–72 by the Churchill Falls (Labrador) Corporation (CFLCo), though generators were installed after major construction was completed. The single generation facility cost C$946 million to construct and produced 5,225 MW of power initially after all eleven generating units were installed. A station upgrade in 1985 raised the generating capacity to over 5,400 MW. Hydro-Québec Generation owns a 34.2% interest in CFLCo, which is the same company that constructed the generating plant. However, Hydro-Québec has rights to most of the 5,400 MW of power the station produces under a power purchase agreement, expiring in 2025.

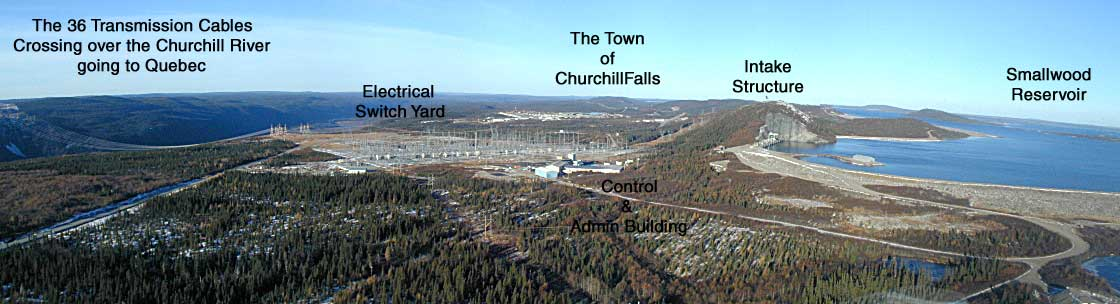
View of Churchill Falls, the electrical substation, and the three 735 kV lines that span the river gorge

== Electricity transmission system features ==
The system contains more than 34,187 kilometres (21,243 mi) of lines and 530 electrical substations. It is managed by Hydro-Québec TransÉnergie, a division of the crown corporation Hydro-Québec and is part of the Northeast Power Coordinating Council. It has 17 interconnectors with the systems in Ontario, New Brunswick, Newfoundland and Labrador, and the Northeastern United States and 6,025 MW of interconnector import capacity and 7,974 MW of interconnector export capacity. The system has transmission lines reaching to power generation facilities located more than 1,000 kilometres (600 mi) away from population centres. For this reason, TransÉnergie uses a voltage of AC 735 kV to transmit and distribute electrical power produced from Hydro-Québec's dams, although 315 kV is used as well. The total value of TransÉnergie's entire electricity transmission system is C$15.9 billion. For these reasons, Hydro-Québec TransÉnergie is considered to be a world leader in power transmission.

=== AC 735 / 765 kV power lines ===
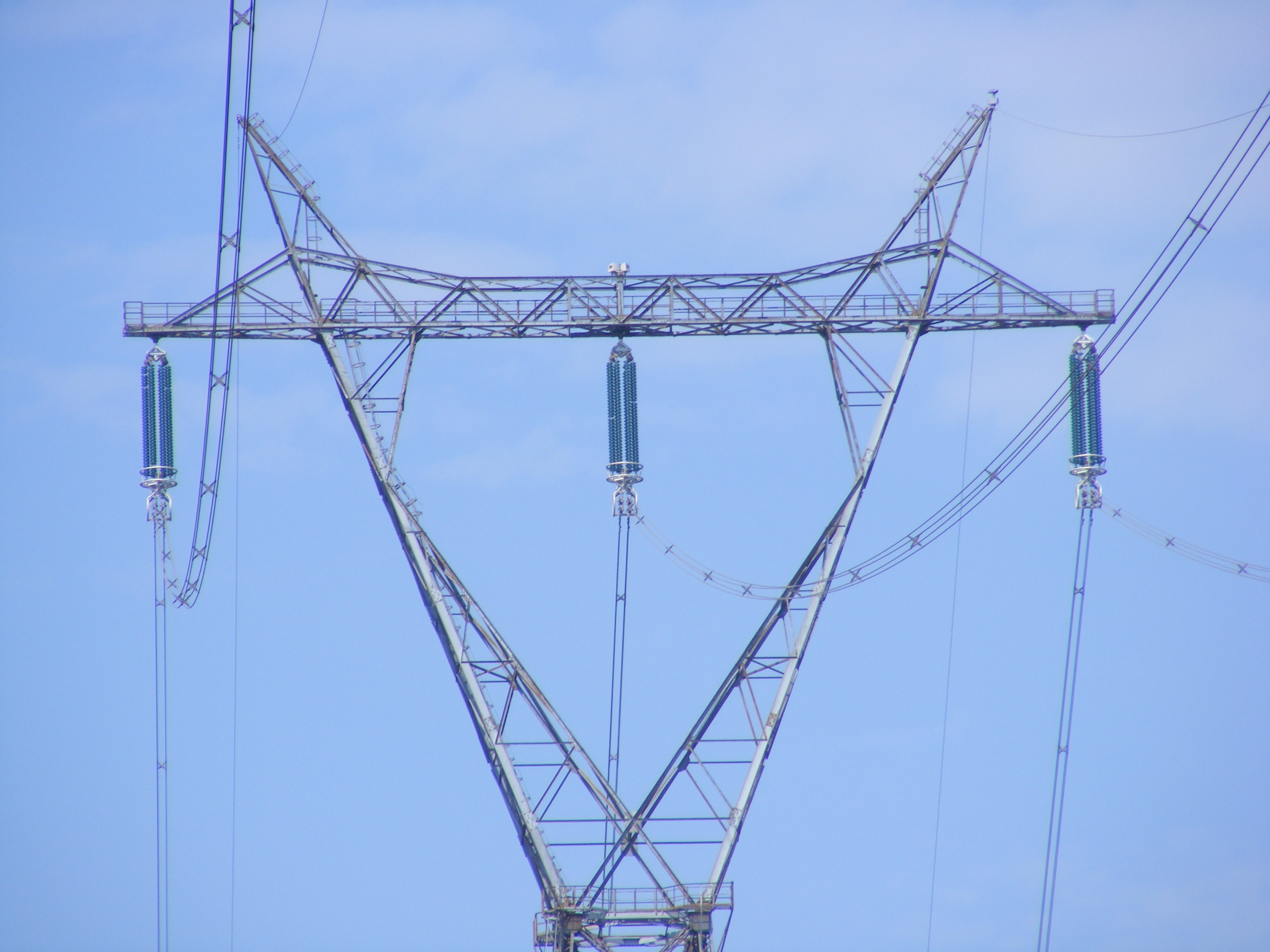
A Mae West tower from a Hydro-Québec TransÉnergie 735 kV power line, recognizable by the x-shaped spacers separating the three 4-conductor sets.

From 1965 onwards, the 735 kV power line became an integral part of Quebec's power transmission backbone. More than one-third of Hydro-Québec TransÉnergie's system consists of high voltage AC 735 / 765 kV power lines, totaling 11,422 kilometres (7,097 mi)^{[A]} strung between 38 substations with equipment of that voltage. The first transmission system from 1965 is an IEEE Milestone.

The physical size of the Hydro-Québec's 735 kV transmission lines is unmatched in North America. Only two other utility companies in the same region, the New York Power Authority (NYPA) and American Electric Power (AEP) contain at least one 765 kV line in their power system. However, only AEP has a significant mileage of 765 kV power lines, with over 3,400 kilometres (2,100 mi) of 765 kV line traversing its broad transmission system; this system contains the most mileage in the United States under one electrical company. NYPA has only 219 kilometres (136 mi) of 765 kV line, all of it contained in a single direct interconnector with Hydro-Québec.

The 735 kV power line is said to lessen the environmental impact of power lines, as one single power line operating at this voltage carries the same amount of electric power as four 315 kV power lines, which would require a right-of-way wider than the 80.0–91.5 metres (262.5–300.2 ft) width required for a single 735 kV line. Each 735 kV line is capable of transmitting 2,000 MW of electric power at a distance of over 1,000 kilometres (620 miles) and the entire 735 kV grid can carry 25,000 MW of power. Power transmission losses over the 735 kV grid range from 4.5 to 8%, varying due to temperature and operating situations. The Ordre des ingénieurs du Québec named the 735 kV power line system as the technological innovation of the 20th century for Quebec.

In the wake of the 1998 ice storm the Levis De-Icer was installed and began testing in 2007 and 2008.

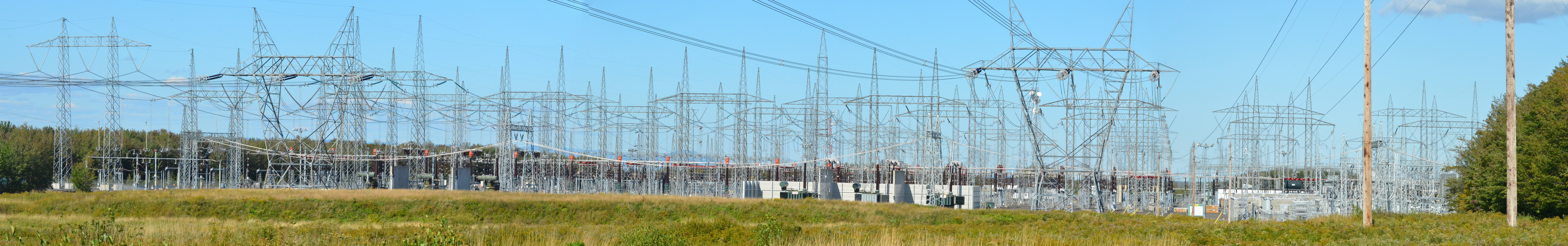
The Lévis substation.

==== Routes ====
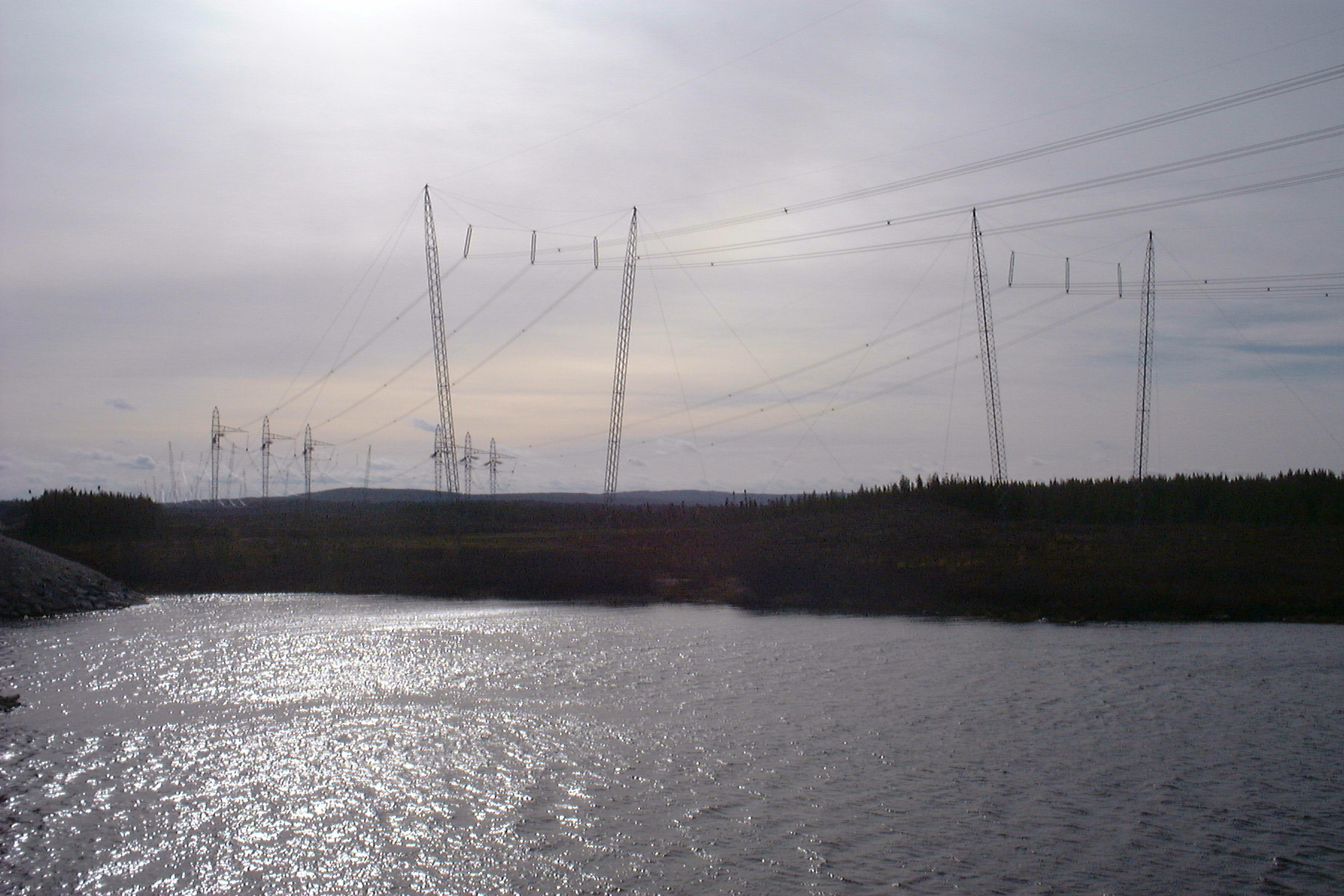
Cross rope "Chainette" ("little necklace") suspension towers used on some parts of 735 kV lines between the James Bay hydroelectric complex and Montreal.

Hydro-Québec TransÉnergie's 735 kV system consists of a set of six lines running from James Bay to Montreal and a set of four lines from Churchill Falls and the Manic-Outardes power stations to Quebec City. The South Shore region of Montreal and the Saint Lawrence River between Montreal and Quebec City contain 735 kV power line loops or rings.

James Bay

The James Bay hydroelectric dam complex contains several relatively short 735 kV power lines that send electricity to three principal substations, ordered from west to east: Radisson, Chissibi, and Lemoyne. From these substations, six 735 kV power lines traverse the vast expanses of taiga and boreal forest in clear-cut stretches of land; this shows up clearly in aerial photos. The terrain that the power lines cross is for the most part not mountainous, but smooth and replete with lakes. Generally, four of the lines runs together in two pairs and the other two run solo, although the two single lines sometimes do run in a pair. Two intermediate 735 kV power lines, one in the north and one in the south, connect all six power lines along their path to southern Quebec.

As the lines continue south, they diverge into two sets of three 735 kV transmission lines. The eastern set heads to Quebec City, where it connects with power lines from Churchill Falls and the 735 kV power line loops in the Saint Lawrence River region. The western set heads to Montreal, where it too forms a ring of 735 kV power lines around the city, linking to other power loops in the region. This section of Hydro-Québec TransÉnergie's power grid contains 7,400 km (4,600 mi) of 735 kV AC and 450 kV DC power line.

Manic-Outardes power stations / Churchill Falls

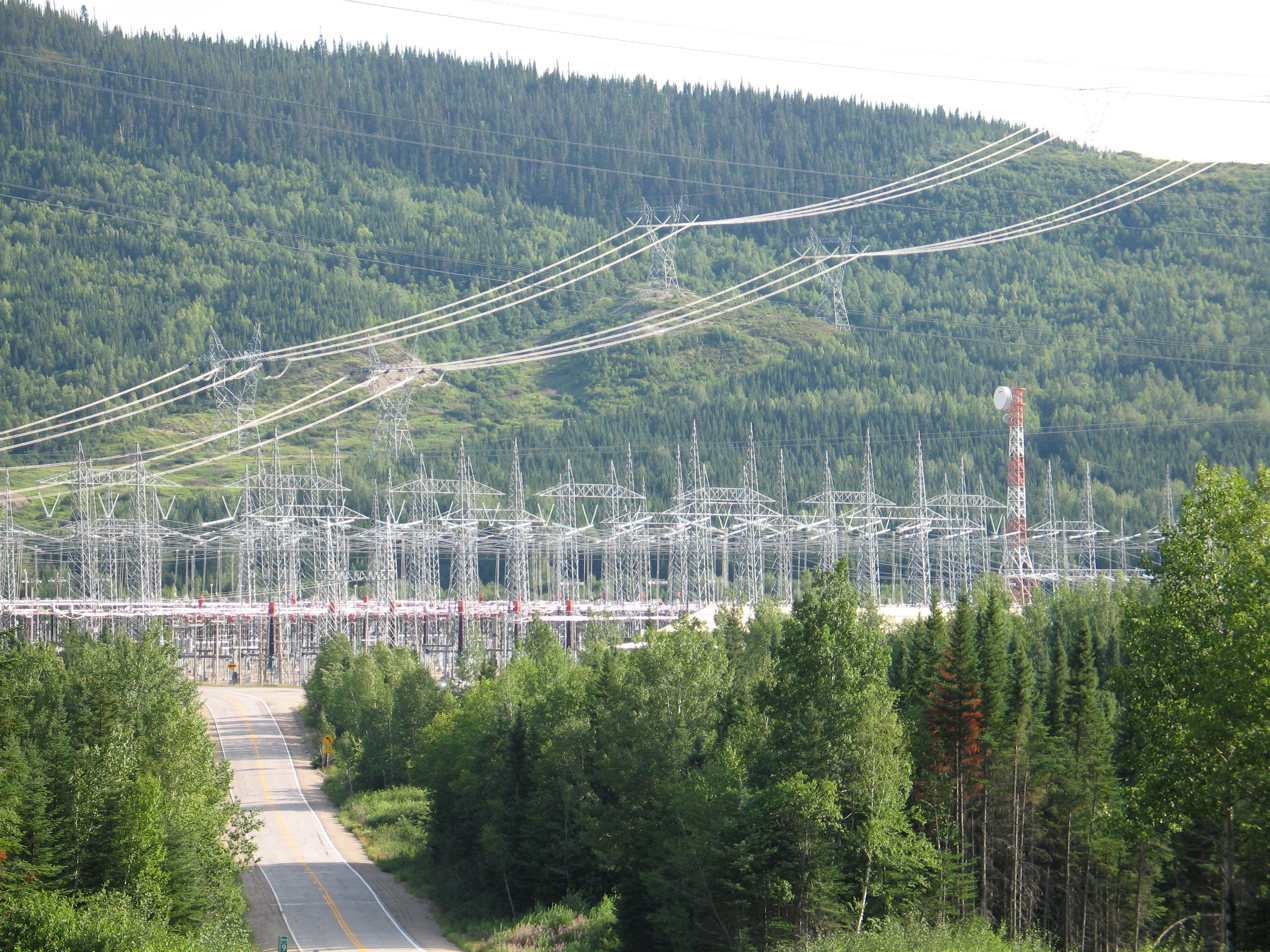
The Micoua substation, on Quebec's North Shore. The substation is one of TransÉnergie's transmission hubs.

Electrical power generated from the Churchill Falls power station is sent to Montreal and the population centres of the Northeastern United States, more than 1,200 kilometres (700 mi) away. Starting from the generation station in Newfoundland and Labrador, the power lines span a distance of 1,800 metres (6,000 ft) over the Churchill River gorge and run generally south-southwest for 203 kilometres (126 mi) as three side-by-side power lines in a cleared right-of-way with a width of 216 metres (709 feet). As they head southwest through boreal forest, the lines generally traverse flat, smooth rolling hills.

After the lines cross the Quebec-Labrador border, also known as the Hydro-Québec point of delivery, the direction of the lines becomes due south, and they head to the Montagnais Substation, a substation accessible only by an airport adjacent to it. A lone 735 kV line stems off from the substation, heading to an open pit mine 142 kilometres (88 mi) the northwest. The terrain crossed by the power lines becomes hilly and mountainous south of the border. The lines reach over 800 metres (2,600 ft) in elevation before descending. The three lines continue heading south until they reach a substation on the North Shore of the Gulf of Saint Lawrence. From there on, the three lines parallel the North Shore as the Gulf narrows to the southwest toward the Saint Lawrence River discharge mouth. The northernmost power line then diverges from the other two to connect with Manic-Outardes power stations located on and around the Rivière aux Outardes and the Manicouagan River.

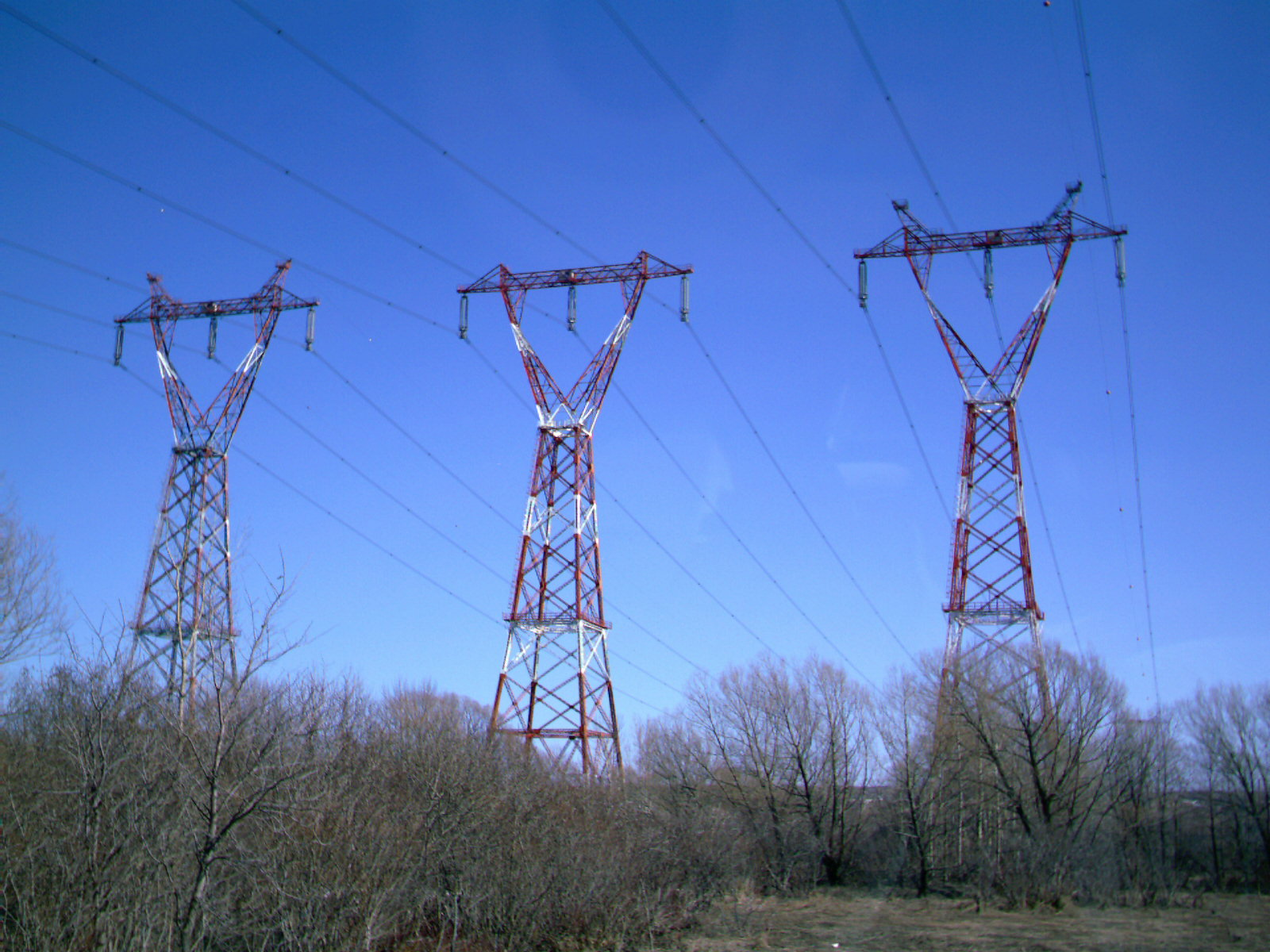
Triple 735kV Mae West towers at Boischatel / L'Ange-Gardien limits, on Route 138 east of Quebec City, as lines crosses the St. Lawrence River south towards the Île d'Orléans.

As the lines near Quebec City, the northern power line rejoins the other two 735 kV power lines. The three lines, paralleled by another 735 kV power line some distance to the north, span over the Saint Lawrence River to the South Shore region, where the lines form loops encompassing part of the Saint Lawrence River and the south shore. The loops are also connected to the ring of 735 kV power lines around Montreal and power lines running south from James Bay.

=== Hydro towers ===
Quebec's transmission system contains a variety of hydro towers depending on era and voltage level. Older tower designs tend to consume more material than the newer towers and the higher the voltage level, the larger the tower.

735 kV towers

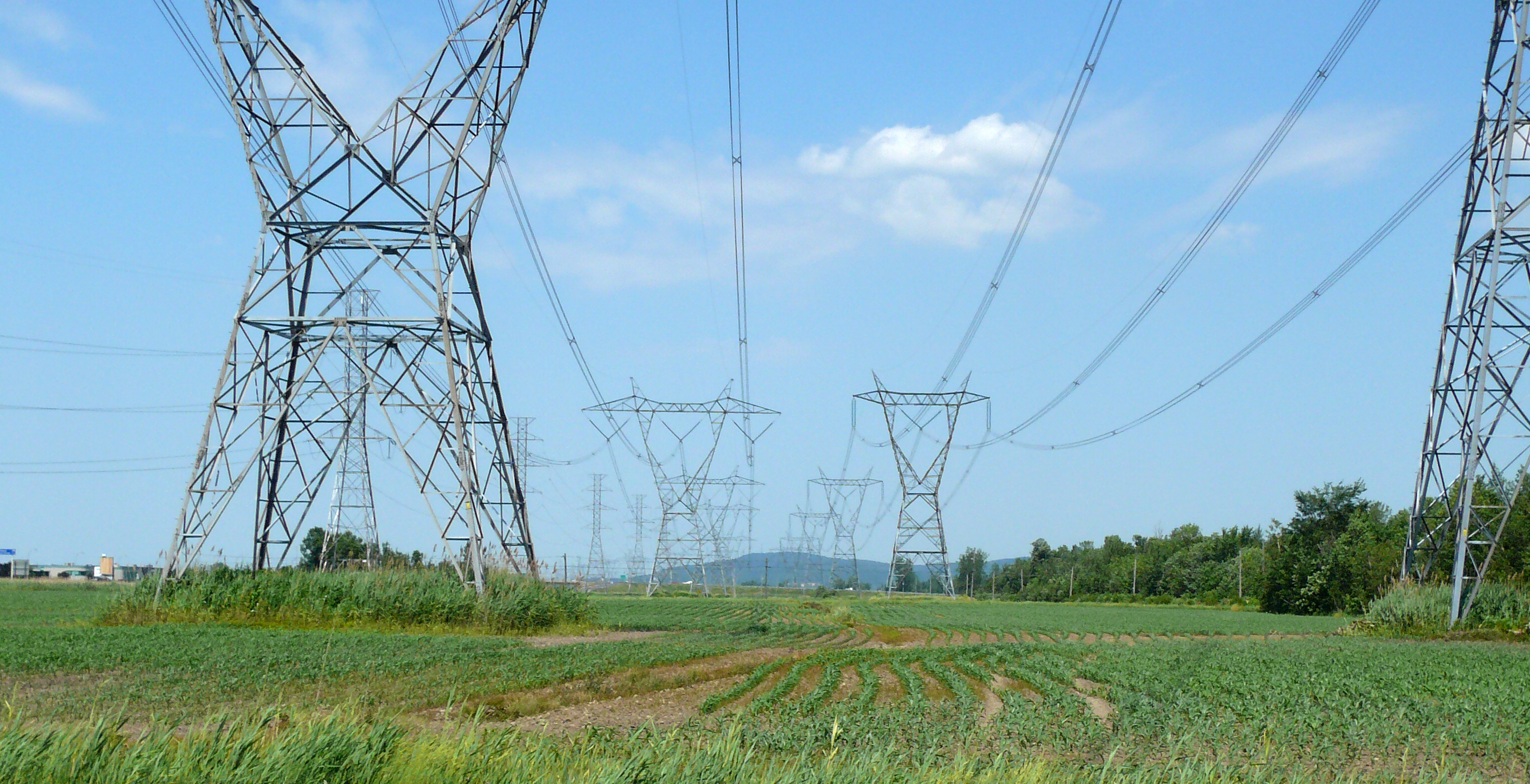
Two types of single-circuit 735 kV delta towers near Saint-Jean-sur-Richelieu, paralleled by a dual-circuit 315 kV line to the left in the background. The center 735 kV line uses a larger version delta tower while the one to the right uses a smaller one.

Hydro-Québec TransÉnergie uses several different types of electricity towers to support their 735 kV power lines. All of them are single-circuit, meaning that each tower carries one power line with three bundles of four electrical subconductors separated by spacers, with each bundle transmitting one phase of current.

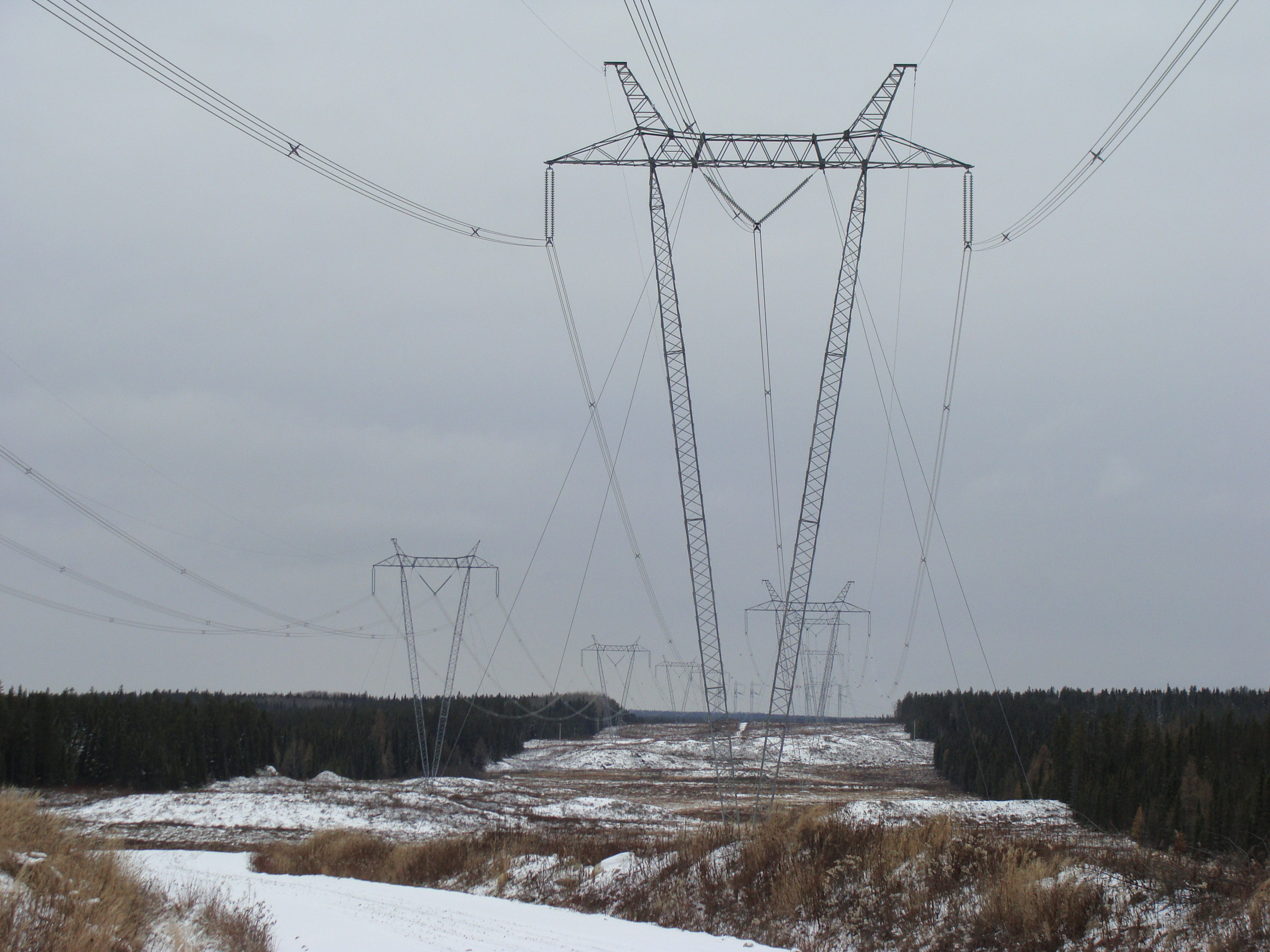
A series of V-guyed towers, near Chapais, Quebec.

The earliest type of tower used was a massive self-supporting delta tower, or waist tower, which consumed 21 tonnes of steel per kilometre of line. This type of tower was used for the first 735 kV power line from the Manic-Outardes power stations to the load centre of Montreal. There are two significant variations of the delta tower; one has longer side crossbars such that all three bundles of conductors are suspended on V-shaped insulators. The other has shorter side crossbars, such that the two outside bundles are hung on a vertical insulator string and only the middle bundle is hung with a V-shaped insulator.

Over the years, Hydro-Québec researchers engineered a new type of tower, the V-guyed tower, which reduced materials consumption to 11.8 tonnes of steel per kilometre of power line. This type of tower also includes a variation with longer side crossbars, where all conductors are hung with a V-shaped insulator and one with shorter side crossbar, where only the middle bundle hangs from the insulator and the side bundles are strung on vertical insulator strings.

During the construction of the James Bay transmission system, the cross-rope suspension tower was invented. This type of tower features two guyed-tower legs similar to the V-guyed tower, but the two legs don't converge at the tower base. In the case of the cross-rope suspension tower, the tower legs are spread apart on two different foundations. In addition, the crossbar is replaced by a series of suspension cables with three vertical insulator strings to support the three bundles, which allows this design to consume only 6.3 tonnes of steel per kilometre of line. The design is also known as the Chainette (little necklace).

TransÉnergie uses two-level towers for angle towers or structures on 735 kV power lines to change the direction of the line or switch the position of the conductor bundles. Delta towers and three-leg guyed towers are also used as angle towers; they are referred to as "penguins" by Hydro-Québec linemen.

Towers for other voltage levels

Hydro-Québec TransÉnergie uses a combination of double-circuit three-level towers and single-circuit delta towers to suspend electrical conductors of other voltages, such as 315 kV. The ±450 kV high-voltage direct current line in Hydro-Québec's power grid uses a T-shaped tower, lattice or pole, to support two bundles of three conductors on each side. The direct current power line sometimes uses two poles or a wider, pyramidal, self-supporting lattice structure for angle towers.

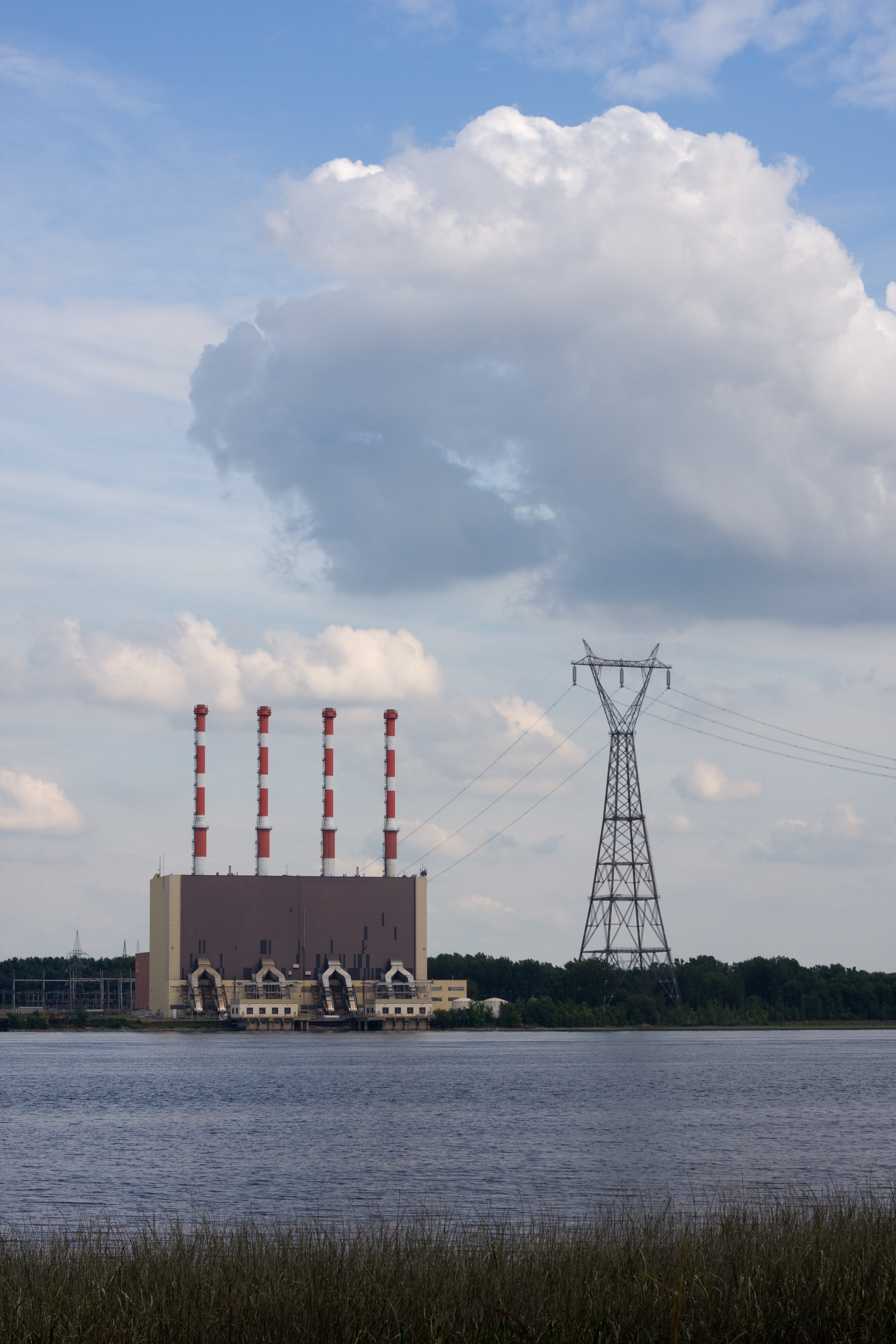
174.6 metre (572'10") tower adjacent to Hydro-Québec's now-decommissioned Tracy power plant.

Other towers

Hydro-Québec usually uses tall, large towers to cross large bodies of water, like lakes and rivers. These towers are said to be prominent and the tallest tower in Hydro-Québec's power grid is of this function. The tallest of these is located near the Tracy power station on the shore of the Saint Lawrence River, carrying a 735kV circuit between Lanoraie and Tracy. The tower, the largest of its kind in Canada, is 174.6 metres (572.8 ft) tall, the same height as the Montreal Olympic Stadium, and slightly larger than the Washington Monument in the United States (555 feet (169.2 m)).

Tower strength

The towers and conductors are designed to handle 45 millimetres (1.8 inches) of ice accumulation without failure, since Hydro-Québec raised the standards in response to ice storms in Ottawa in December 1986 and Montreal in February 1961, which left 30 to 40 millimetres (1.2 to 1.6 inches) of ice. This has led to the belief that Hydro-Québec TransÉnergie's hydro towers are "indestructible". Despite being more than three times higher than the Canadian standard of only 13 millimetres (0.51 inches) of ice tolerance, an ice storm in the late-1990s deposited up to 70 millimetres (2.8 inches) of ice.

=== Interconnections ===
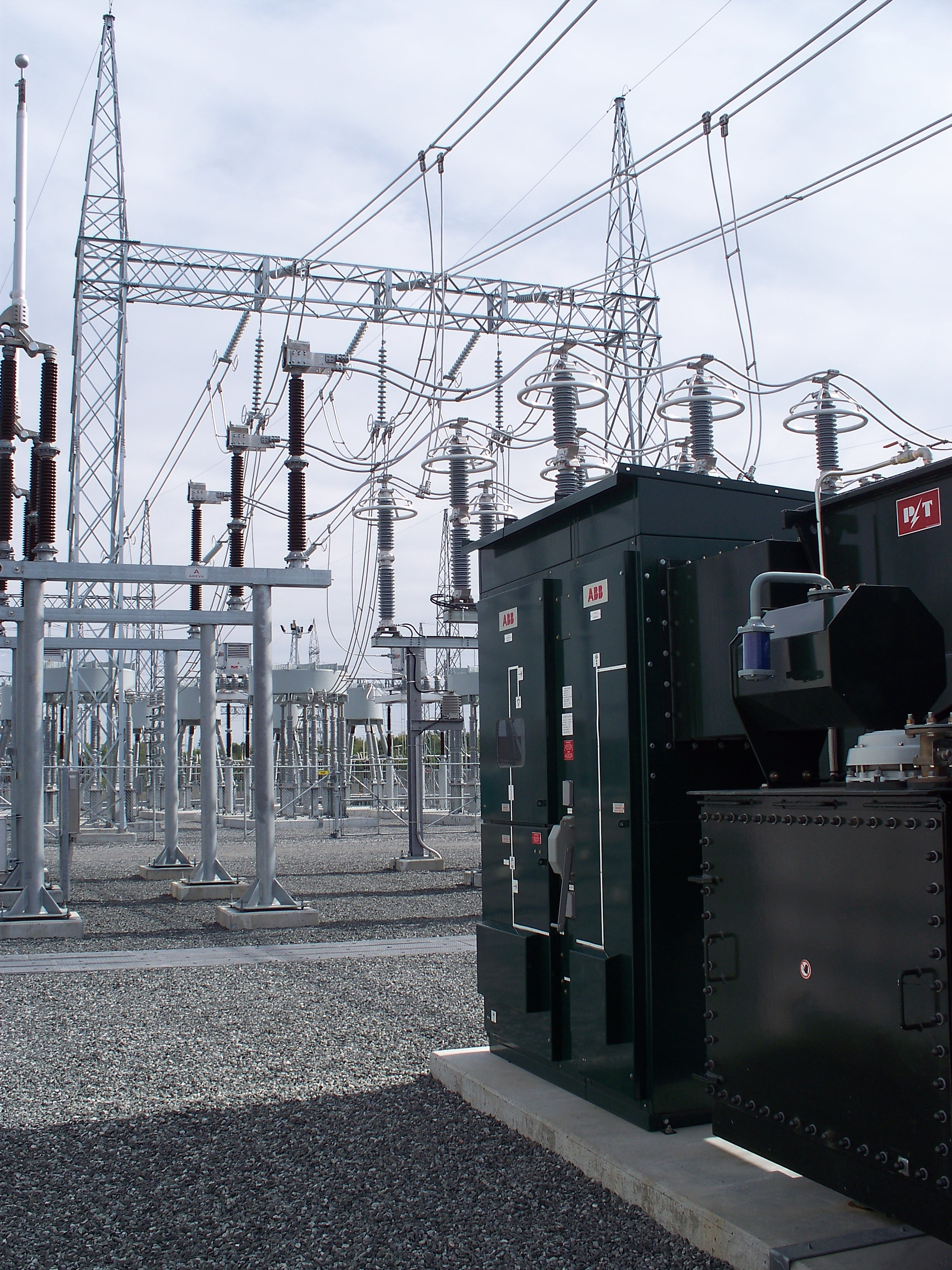
The Outaouais substation, the newest of 19 interconnections between Hydro-Québec's network and neighboring power grids.

Across North America, electricity transmission systems are interconnected into wide area synchronous grids, or interconnections. Suppliers are legally required to follow reliability standards. In 2006, Quebec's transmission system was recognized by the North American Electric Reliability Corporation (NERC) as a full interconnection because it is asynchronous with neighboring systems. Quebec will consequently be able to develop its own reliability standards, as needed, and these will apply in addition to the relevant North American standards. Besides the Quebec Interconnection, there are four other interconnections in North America: the Eastern Interconnection, the Western Interconnection, the Alaska Interconnection and the Electric Reliability Council of Texas.

Hydro-Québec TransÉnergie has the following interconnectors with systems in neighboring provinces and states:

- New York: two connections. Capacity is 1,100 MW import, 1,999 MW export.
- Ontario: eight connections. 1,970 MW import, 2,705 MW export.
- New England: three connections. 2,170 MW import, 2,275 MW export.
- New Brunswick: three connections. 785 MW import, 1,029 MW export.
- Newfoundland and Labrador: one connection. 5,500 MW import, 0 MW export.

The maximum simultaneous delivery (export) for the interconnector common to New York and Ontario is 325 MW.

=== High voltage direct current (HVDC) 450 kV ===
In addition to the six 735 kV power lines that stem from the James Bay Project, a seventh power line was constructed as an 1,100 kilometres (680 mi) northward extension of an existing high-voltage direct current (HVDC) line connecting Quebec and New England. This power line expansion was completed in 1990. As a result, the direct current power line is unique because there are multiple static converter and inverter stations along the 1,480 kilometres (920 mi) long power line. It is also the first multiterminal HVDC line in the world. The ±450 kV power line can transmit about 2,000 MW of hydroelectric power to Montreal and the Northeastern United States.

==== Route ====
Beginning in the converter station next to the Radisson substation, the HVDC line heads south and roughly parallels the six 735 kV power lines some distance to the west. It traverses the same type of terrain as the other six lines; the land is replete with lakes, wetlands, and forested rolling hills. Gradually, the power line turns to the southeast, as it crosses under several 735 kV power lines.

After the six 735 kV wires split up into two groups of three power lines each, the HVDC line follows the eastern group, and the western set diverges away. The line remains overhead until it reaches the north shore of the Saint Lawrence River near Grondines, where the 450 kV HVDC line descends into an underwater tunnel traversing the river. The power line surfaces on the south shore near Lotbinière substation. After the river crossing, the line enters into the Nicolet terminal near Sainte-Eulalie, northeast of Drummondville. South of the terminal, the line heads south and after a relatively short distance, it enters the Des Cantons close to Sherbrooke.

Leaving the Des Cantons station, the power line crosses the Canada–US border and passes through the hilly Appalachian Mountains in the U.S. state of Vermont, reaching an elevation of about 650 metres (2,130 ft). The line then continues heading south-southeast and enters the state of New Hampshire, where it reaches the Comerford terminal near Monroe. Continuing southward into Massachusetts, the line reaches the Sandy Pond terminal outside of Boston in Ayer. The terminal is the southernmost extent of the HVDC line.

In December 2008, Hydro-Québec, along with American utilities Northeast Utilities and NSTAR, created a joint venture to build a new HVDC line from Windsor, Quebec to Deerfield, New Hampshire. Hydro-Québec will own the segment within Quebec, while the segment within the US will be owned by Northern Pass Transmission LLC, a partnership between Northeast Utilities (75%) and NSTAR (25%). Estimated to cost US$1.1 billion to build, it is projected that the line will either run in existing right-of-way adjacent to the HVDC line that runs through New Hampshire, or it will connect to a right-of-way in northern New Hampshire that will run through the White Mountains. This 180-to-190-mile (290 to 310 km) line, projected to carry 1,200 megawatts, will bring electricity to approximately one million homes.

=== Other features ===
TransÉnergie uses series compensation to alter the way electricity behaves in power transmission lines, which improves the electricity transmission efficiency. This reduces the need to construct new power lines and increases the amount of electric power sent to population centres. Series compensation is based on capacitor technology. To maintain its transmission system performance, TransÉnergie sets aside funds for research and application of new technologies. In addition to power transmission technology, Hydro-Québec plans to offer high-speed internet over its transmission lines within a few years; the utility started testing internet over its lines in January 2004.

== Major disruptions ==
In spite of the transmission system's reputation and the fact Quebec escaped unscathed from the Northeast Blackout of 2003, the system has experienced damage and service interruptions from severe storms in the past. Examples include the 1982 and 1988 Quebec blackouts prior to the large 1989 and 1998 power interruptions.

=== 1989 Geomagnetic storm ===
At 2:44 am EST on March 13, 1989, a severe geomagnetic storm, due to a coronal mass ejection from the Sun, struck Earth. Fluctuations within the magnetic field of the storm caused geomagnetically induced currents (GICs) to flow as direct current through Quebec's power lines, which are normally only conducting alternating current. The insulating nature of the Canadian Shield igneous rock directed the GICs to the power lines. The conductors then forwarded this current to sensitive electrical transformers, which require a certain voltage amplitude and frequency to function properly. Although most GICs are relatively feeble, the nature of those currents destabilized the voltage of the power grid and unbalanced current spikes erupted everywhere.

Accordingly, protective measures were taken in response. To save the transformers and other electrical equipment, the power grid was taken out of commission, as circuit breakers tripped all over Quebec and shut off the power. Within less than 90 seconds, this wave of breaking circuits left the entire transmission grid out of service. The collapsed power grid left six million people and the rest of Quebec without electricity for hours on a very cold night. Even though the blackout lasted around nine hours for most places, some locations were in the dark for days. This geomagnetic storm caused about C$10 million in damage to Hydro-Québec and tens of millions to the customers of the utility.

=== 1998 ice storm ===
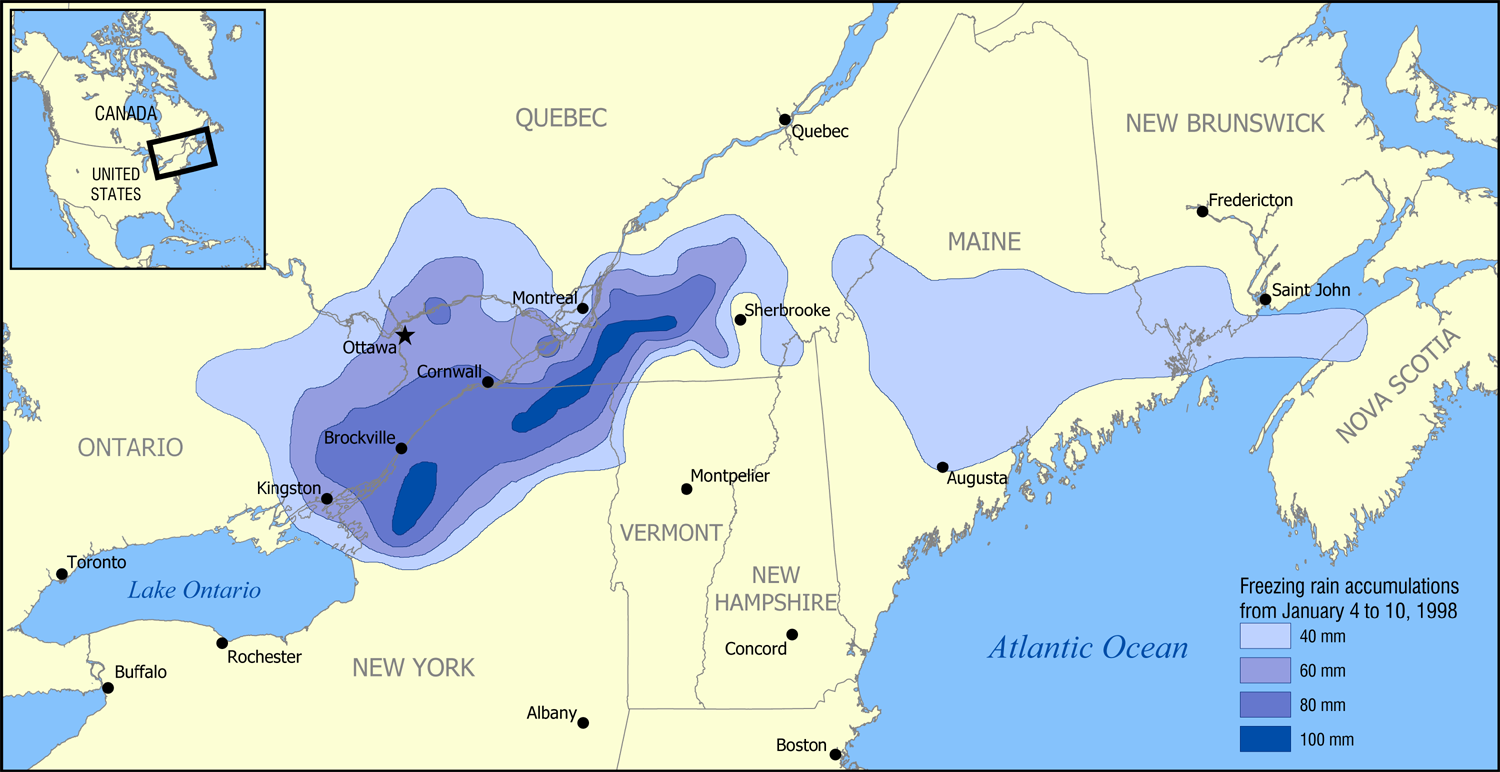
Map showing precipitation amounts for Quebec and the Northeastern United States

From January 4/5 to January 10, 1998, warm moist air from the south overriding cold air from the north produced an ice storm, leading to over 80 hours of freezing rain and drizzle. For days, a continuous shower of mostly freezing rain amounted to 70–110 millimetres (2.8–4.3 inches) of water equivalent of precipitation. Places like Montreal and the South Shore were especially hard hit, with 100 mm (3.9 in) of largely freezing rain falling. These heavy precipitation totals wreaked havoc on the regional power transmission system.

==== Physical damage ====
Five to six days of freezing rain and precipitation crippled the Hydro-Québec power grid in the Montreal and South Shore regions. In an area 100 by 250 kilometres (62 by 155 miles), some 116 transmission lines were out of commission, including several major 735 kV power lines and the Quebec–New England HVDC ±450 kV line.

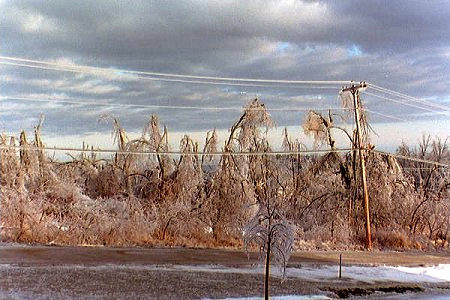
Damage to trees and a power distribution line

Through successive waves of freezing precipitation, more than 75 millimetres (3.0 inches) of radial ice accumulated on the electrical conductors and the towers themselves. This ice coating adds an additional weight of 15 to 20 kilograms per metre of conductor (10 to 20 lb/ft). Even though the electrical wires can withstand this extra weight, when combined with the effects of wind and precipitation, these conductors may break and fall. The towers, designed to withstand only 45 millimetres (1.8 inches) of ice accretion, buckled and collapsed into twisted heaps of mangled steel. Cascading failures occurred on several transmission lines, where the collapse of one or more towers left a row of fallen towers.

Of all the towers damaged, some 150 were towers supporting 735 kV lines, and 200 towers carrying 315 kV, 230 kV, or 120 kV power lines collapsed as well.^{[B]} In a region bounded by Montreal between Saint-Hyacinthe, Saint-Jean-sur-Richelieu and Granby, dubbed the "triangle of darkness", half of the overhead power grid was out of service. Quebec ordered myriad conductors, crossarms, and wire connections to repair the ones disabled by the storm in the electrical transmission and electric power distribution system. In all of Quebec, 24,000 poles, 4,000 transformers, and 1,000 electrical towers were damaged or destroyed,^{[B]} more than 3,000 km (2,000 mi) of downed electrical wires; this cost a total of C$800 million to repair.

==== Power outage ====
With over 100 transmission lines paralyzed by the ice, Quebec fell into a massive power outage in the cold Canadian winter. Even though power restoration initiated after the first blackouts, large numbers of Quebecers were in the dark. At the height of the blackout, some 1.4–1.5 million homes and customers, housing three to more than four million people, were in the dark. Private companies and other utilities from other parts of Canada and the United States were sent in to help Hydro-Québec undertake this massive restoration task, but these efforts were complicated by the widespread damage of the power grid. Blackouts in some areas lasted for 33 days, and 90% of those affected by the blackout had no power for more than seven days. Although power was fully restored to all locations in Quebec by February 8, 1998, it wasn't until mid-March that the power facilities were back in service. By then, much social and economic damage had occurred, such as ruined food and deaths resulting from lack of electric heating.

After the power outage was over, Hydro-Québec made numerous upgrades to its system in order to improve the power grid. Examples include the strengthening of electrical towers and power poles, and increasing the power supply. This was done to enable the utility to restore power more rapidly in the case of a massive ice striking Quebec again. Hydro-Québec has stated that it is better-prepared to handle an ice storm with the same magnitude as the one of 1998.

=== 2004 hydro tower bombing ===
In 2004, shortly before U.S. President George W. Bush's visit to Canada, a tower along the Quebec – New England Transmission HVDC circuit in the Eastern Townships near the Canada–US border was damaged by explosive charges detonated at its base. The CBC reported that a message, purportedly from the Résistance internationaliste and issued to the La Presse and Le Journal de Montréal newspapers and the CKAC radio station, stated that the attack had been carried out to "denounce the 'pillaging' of Quebec's resources by the United States."

== Criticism ==
The performance of Hydro-Québec TransÉnergie's power grid during the 1998 ice storm raised questions about the fundamental concept, vulnerability, and reliability of the grid. Critics noted that the power generation facilities were located approximately 1,000 km (600 mi) away from population centres and that there was a lack of local power stations around Montreal, which is served by only six 735 kV feeder lines; five of these lines form a loop called the "ring of power" around the city. When the ring failed on January 7, 1998, roughly 60% of Greater Montreal's power supply was offline. Hydro-Québec's large above-ground transmission and distribution system was considered to be exposed to natural disasters, although the cost of undergrounding the grid was prohibitive.

The technology utilized on Hydro-Québec TransÉnergie grid also came under fire from critics. It is claimed that this technology, used to improve performance, safety, and reliability, made people in Quebec over-dependent on the power grid for their energy needs, since electricity, especially hydroelectric power, makes up over 40% of Quebec's energy supply. This dependence, evidenced by the fact Ontario farmers had more backup generators than farmers in Quebec, can increase the severity of the consequences when the grid fails, as it did in January 1998.

== Influence of Cross-Border Transmission Research ==
In addition to the long-standing focus on large-scale transmission expansion, contemporary research—such as that presented by Gazar et al. (2024)—has investigated the causal relationships between cross-border transmission capacity, new hydroelectric generation, and evolving energy demand in the northeastern United States and Canada. Their Bayesian network analysis suggests that increases in Quebec’s hydroelectric capacity historically correlate more strongly with domestic demand and market price signals, rather than simply the availability of expanded transmission corridors. These findings can inform discussions of whether newly proposed U.S.–Canada intertie projects should include upstream reservoir development in environmental impact assessments.

== Notes ==
A. Two figures are given for the length of the 735 kV system: 11,422 and 11,527 km (7,097 and 7,163 mi).
B. ^ ^{a} ^{b} Estimates on the total number of poles and pylons damaged / destroyed by the ice storm vary.
