= Levis De-Icer =

Coordinates: 46°42′17″N 71°11′39″W

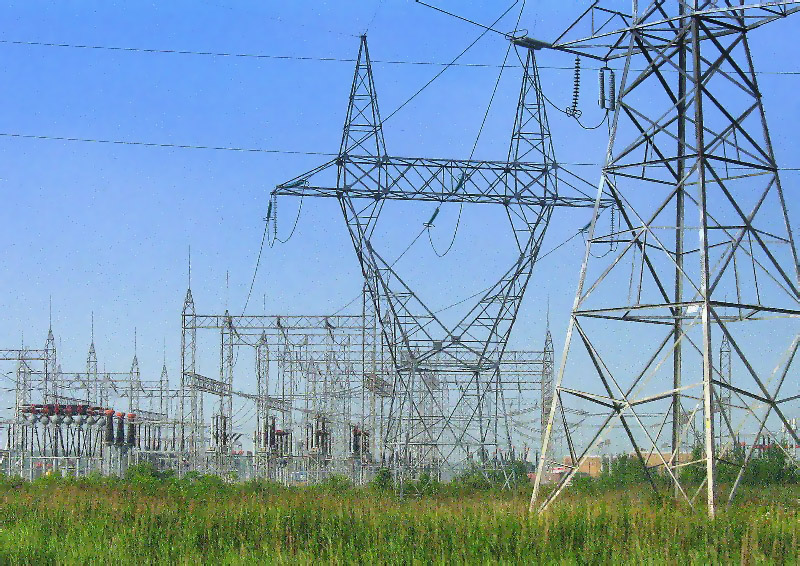
Hydro-Québec's Lévis substation where the de-icer is located.

The Levis De-Icer is a High voltage direct current (HVDC) system, aimed at de-icing multiple AC power lines in Quebec, Canada. It is the only HVDC system not used for power transmission.

In the winter of 1998, Québec's power lines were toppled by icing, sometimes up to 75 mm. To prevent such a damage, a de-icing system was developed.

The Levis De-Icer can use a maximum power of 250 MW; its operation voltage is ±17.4 kV. It can be used on multiple 735 kV AC power lines.

When there is no icing, the Lévis De-Icer installed at Hydro-Québec's Lévis substation, south of Quebec City operates as static VAR compensator improving the stability of the AC lines.

== What the De-icer is and what it does ==
The North American ice storm of 1998 resulted in many of Hydro Quebec's transmission towers collapsing as a result of excessive ice buildup on conductors. To ensure that similar events wouldn't happen again, Hydro-Québec TransEnergie created a De-icing system for their transmission lines . The De-icing system runs a high direct current (DC) into a selected transmission line in order to melt the ice off the conductors. However, because the operation in this mode may be very infrequent, when the installation is not being used for deicing, it is used as a Static Var Compensator, SVC for short, by using the HVDC valves as a Thyristor Controlled Reactor. An innovative design is used, minimizing the power losses of the valves in SVC mode. The reason alternating current wasn't used was because AC would require a lot of reactive support. It would take a significantly higher amount of voltage to push the necessary current through the line. The high voltage power transmission system in Quebec runs in two transmission corridors, one high voltage system runs in the north-west from the main load centres of Montreal and Quebec and the other runs north-east along the Saint-Lawrence river. It is the latter corridor that is mainly in an area prone to ice storms that deposit ice on the transmission lines.

== How it works ==
The selected power transmission line is configured for de-icing mode after being isolated from its respective circuit. A de-icing circuit is created by a set of disconnect switches controlled by the DCU which connects the transmission line to the de-icing converter. The DC power is slowly increased to reach the desired level of current. Once the line has been de-iced, the de-icing disconnect switches are opened and the DCU then releases the line back to the AC network. The line to be de-iced must stay in normal operation during the entire period of DCU development and start-up. The final installation of the SVC/de-icer requires a de-icing line equipment pre-operational testing before being installed. This system is rarely used, only for critical conditions as the operators would be under heavy stress and the man-machine interface (MMI) must be on guided mode. For the five transmission lines equipped for de-icing, there are 13 line topologies which have between 40 and 90 actions per line to be performed during the de-icing process. Out of the five lines, four have three de-icing circuit topologies and the last only has one. The DCU must offer the possibility to manually confirm the equipment’s state to the operator in order to continue the process as there is always a chance of communication failure. Flexible stimulation sequences used for control logic and MMI validation, pre-operational testing and operator training are required for line equipment and SVC. For 735 kV lines, de-icing takes place in three steps while 315 kV double circuit lines only need one. A DCU supervises and coordinates all the actions required for de-icing each line in order to provide network security and ensure the de-icing sequences are reliable.

== De-Icing Currents ==
The current passing through the conductor needs to be just high enough to melt the ice on it without exceeding the thermal limit of the conductor. A 735 kV transmission line with a bundle of four 1354 MCM conductors for each phase, requires a de-icing current of 7200 A per phase. At −10 °C and wind velocity at 10 km/h, it would take 30 minutes of current injection on a phase to melt 12 mm of radial build-up of ice.

== Description of the de-icing concept at Levis ==
The DC converter at Lévis will be used to de-ice 5 lines: four 735 kV single-circuit lines and one 315 kV double-circuit line. Because of the different lengths and sizes of the conductor, the DC installation needs to be able to operate in various voltages and currents. To be de-iced, the transmission line needs be isolated from the AC circuits at both ends. Line conductors are used to form a closed loop between each phase.

== Modes ==
=== In the de-icer mode ===
According to Chris Horwill (AREVA T&D) there are four main design ratings in the de-icer mode. The first one is the Standard de-icer mode. It works at 250 MW and 7200 A from ±17.4 kV at 10 °C. The second one is the Verification mode. It works at 200 MW and 5760 A from ±17.4 kV at 30 °C. The third one is the 1-hour overload. This one works at 300 MW and 7200 A from ±20.8 kV at 10 °C. The last one is the Low ambient overload. It works at 275 MW and 7920 A from ±17.4 kV at −5 °C. The range of operation of the current and voltage is large because all of the sections have different characteristics.

==== Circuit Schematic ====
In "de-icer" mode, the installation provides a controlled high current of DC (direct current) power source which feeds a resistive load. The normal current rating in the de-icer mode is 7200 Adc, defined at an ambient temperature of +10 °C. The current rating is too high for a single converter bridge based on present-day HVDC technology. However, with two converter bridges in parallel, the required DC current per bridge can be met with 125 mm thyristors used in HVDC converters. With two thyristor converters connected in parallel, there are several possible circuit topologies. The three main alternatives considered were: Twelve Pulse Circuit, Double Twelve Pulse Circuit, Double Six Pulse Circuit.

===== Twelve Pulse Circuit =====
In this circuit, the two bridges are fed from separate windings of the step down transformer. To improve harmonic cancellation, they have a 30° phase shift between them. Since the two bridges are connected in parallel, a specialised "Inter-Phase Transformer" is required to balance the differences in their emf. Also, this system requires a complex, multi-winding, step-down transformer.

===== Double Twelve Pulse Circuit =====
In this circuit, two whole, 12 pulse bridges that are series-connected, are connected in parallel. For this one, the "Inter-Phase Transformer" is eliminated because the emf produced by the bridges is the same. The step-down transformer, like in the twelve pulse circuit, is also complex, along with the thrystor valves and their interconnecting busbars.

===== Double Six Pulse Circuit =====
This is a simple connection between two six-pulse thyristor bridges. The de-icer function can be achieved with only a two-winding step-down transformer. Unlike the other two, this circuit can simple controller because the two thyristor bridges can be triggered directly in parallel. As a result, this circuit produces a broader range of harmonic currents and voltages.

=== In the SVC mode ===
According to Chris Horwill, there are also four main design ratings in the SVC mode. The first one is the Dynamic range. This one is at 225 MVAr, or −115 MVAr at nominal voltage. The next one is the Target voltage. It is at 315 kV±5%. The third one is just the Slope. And the last one is 3% on MVAr.

== See also ==
- Hydro-Québec's electricity transmission system
