= List of power stations in Washington =

Sources of Washington utility-scale electricity generation in gigawatt-hours, full-year 2025:
1. Hydroelectric: 65,169 (63.2%)
2. Natural gas: 16,294 (15.8%)
3. Wind: 8,570 (8.32%)
4. Nuclear: 7,748 (7.52%)
5. Coal: 3,160 (3.07%)
6. Biomass: 1,133 (1.10%)
7. Solar: 629 (0.61%)
8. Other gases: 260 (0.25%)
9. Other: 74 (0.07%)

This is a list of electricity-generating power stations in the U.S. state of Washington, sorted by type and name. These include facilities that are located in more than one state. In 2024, Washington had a total summer capacity of 31 GW through all of its power plants, and a net generation of 102,397 GWh. The electrical energy generation mix in 2025 was 63.2% hydroelectric, 15.8% natural gas, 8.3% wind, 7.5% nuclear, 3.1% coal, and 1.1% biomass which includes most refuse-derived fuel. Utility-scale solar and other gases generated most of the remaining 0.9%. Small-scale photovoltaic installations generated an additional net 722 GWh to the state's electrical grid; an amount nearly 15 percent larger than Washington's utility-scale photovoltaic plants.

Washington routinely delivers one-quarter of U.S. hydroelectric generation, and hosts the nation's largest capacity power station at Grand Coulee Dam. 60% of Washington households use electricity as their primary heating fuel, unlike most households in other U.S. states that typically utilize natural gas.

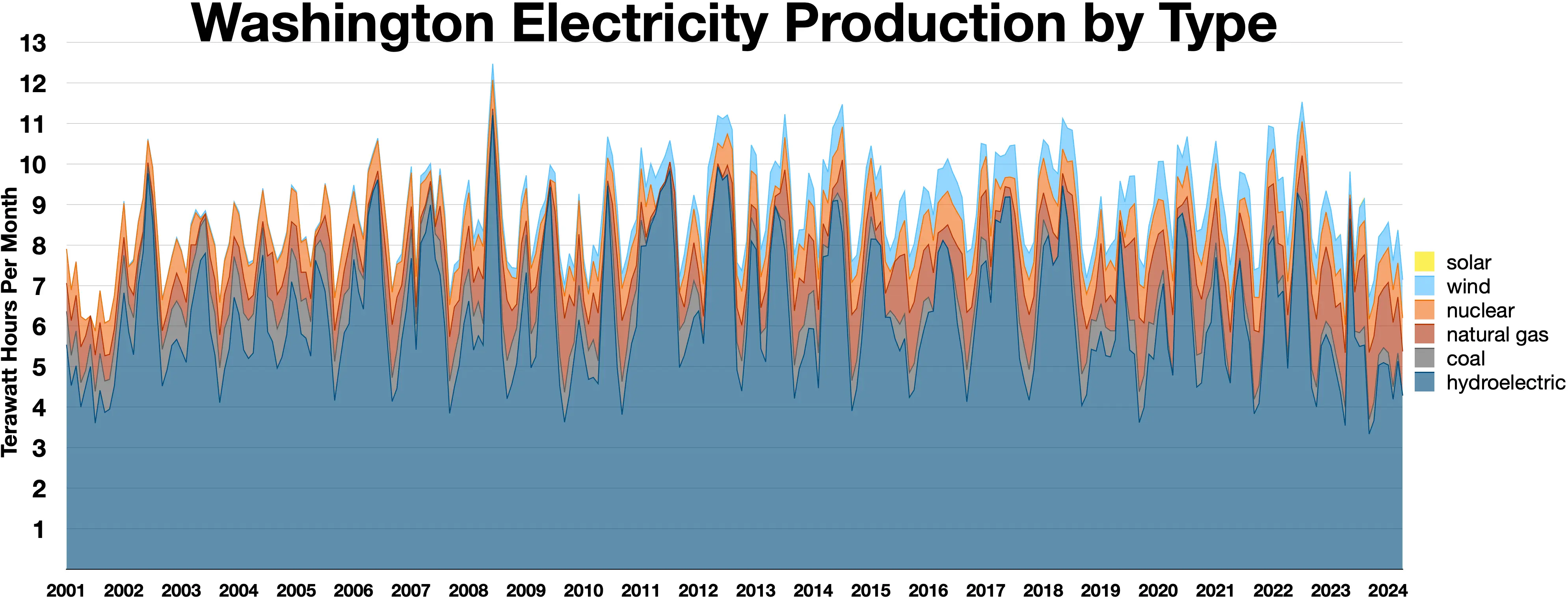
Washington electricity production by type

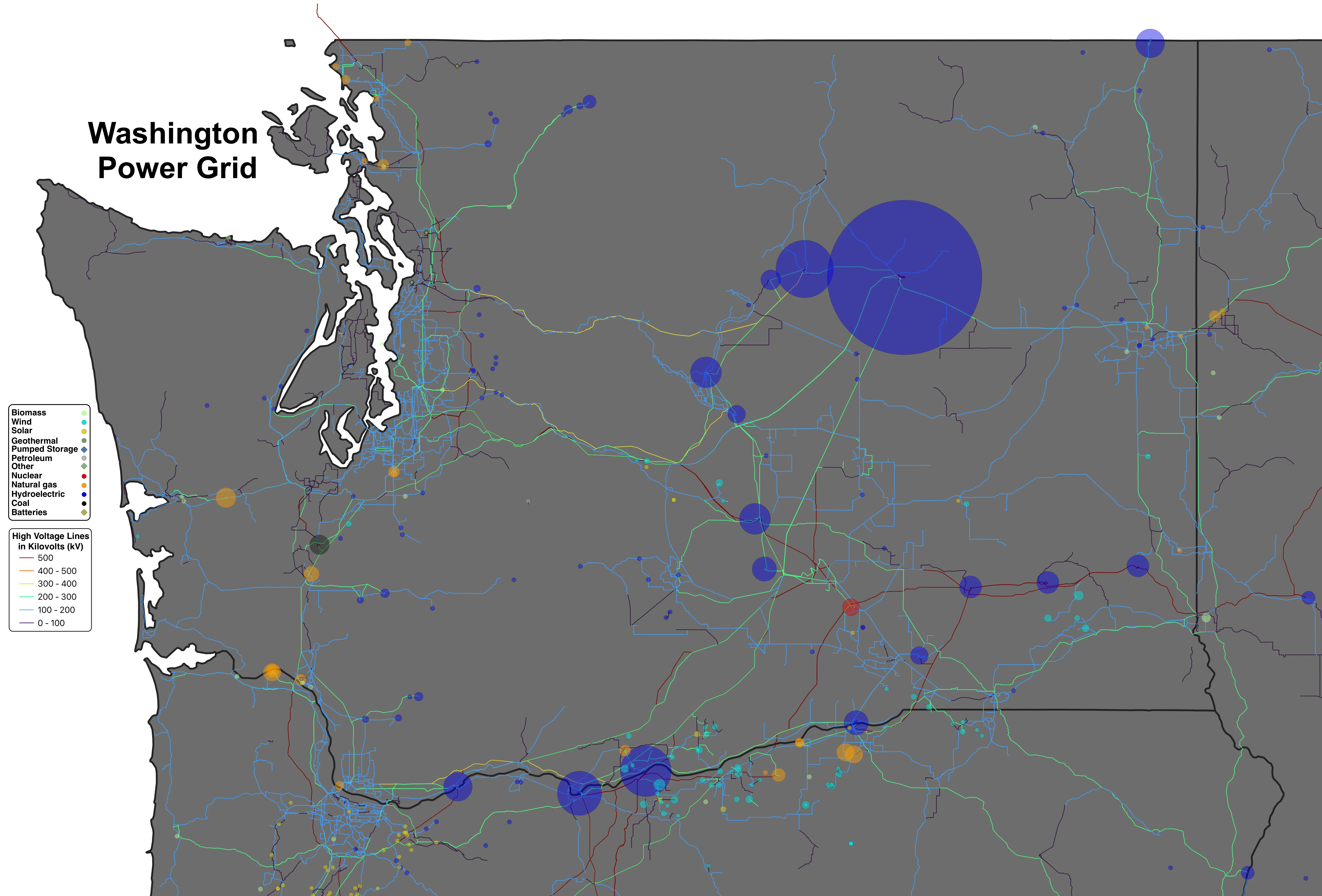
Washington power grid

== Fossil-fuel power stations ==
Data from the U.S. Energy Information Administration serves as a general reference.

=== Coal ===
| Name | Location | Coordinates | Capacity (MW) | Operator | Year opened | Scheduled retirement | Refs |
|---|---|---|---|---|---|---|---|
| Centralia Power Plant | Centralia | 46°45′21″N 122°51′35″W | 670 | TransAlta Corporation | 1972 | Until end of special orders | |

=== Natural gas ===
| Name | Location | Coordinates | Capacity (MW) | Operator | Year opened | Scheduled retirement | Refs |
|---|---|---|---|---|---|---|---|
| Boulder Park Generation Station | Spokane Valley | 47°41′49″N 117°08′50″W | 24 | Avista | 2002 | | |
| Chehalis Generation Facility | Chehalis | 46°37′20″N 122°54′51″W | 477 | PacifiCorp | 2003 | | |
| Encogen Generating Station | Bellingham | 48°44′43″N 122°29′11″W | 159 | Puget Sound Energy | 1993 | | |
| Fredonia Generating Station | Skagit County | 48°27′21″N 122°26′09″W | 280 | Puget Sound Energy | 1984, 2001 | | |
| Frederickson Generating Station | Frederickson | 47°04′47″N 122°21′54″W | 134 | Puget Sound Energy | 1981 | | |
| Frederickson 1 Generating Station | Frederickson | 47°05′10″N 122°21′56″W | 246 | Capital Power | 2002 | | |
| Goldendale Generating Station | Goldendale | 45°48′41″N 120°49′59″W | 263 | Puget Sound Energy | 2004 | | |
| Grays Harbor Energy Center (Note: Originally referred to as the Satsop Combustion Turbine as noted in Grays Harbor Energy Center.) | Satsop | 46°58′09″N 123°28′48″W | 604 | Invenergy | 2008 | | |
| March Point Cogeneration Plant | Anacortes | 48°28′15″N 122°33′36″W | 120 | March Point Cogeneration Company | 1991, 1993 | | |
| Mint Farm Generating Station | Longview | 46°08′24″N 122°59′06″W | 270 | Puget Sound Energy | 2008 | | |
| Northeast (WA) | Spokane | 47°44′06″N 117°22′14″W | 45 | Avista | 1978 | | |
| River Road Generating Plant | Vancouver | 45°39′00″N 122°43′29″W | 220 | Clark Public Utilities | 2010 | | |
| Sumas Generating Station | Sumas | 48°59′26″N 122°16′24″W | 125 | Puget Sound Energy | 1993 | | |
| Ferndale Generating Station | Ferndale | 48°49′44″N 122°41′06″W | 270 | Tenaska Energy | 1994 | | |
| Whitehorn Generating Station | Ferndale | 48°53′08″N 122°45′06″W | 134 | Puget Sound Energy | 1974, 1981 | | |

== Nuclear power stations ==
| Name | Location | Coordinates | Capacity (MW) | Operator | Year opened | Notes |
|---|---|---|---|---|---|---|
| Columbia Generating Station | Benton County | 46°28′16″N 119°20′2″W | 1,150 | Energy Northwest | 1984 | Only US nuclear plant designed to be ramped up and down. Response time 1 hour |

== Renewable power stations ==
Data from the U.S. Energy Information Administration serves as a general reference.

=== Hydroelectric ===
| Name | Location | Coordinates | River | Capacity (MW) | Operator | Year opened | Ref |
|---|---|---|---|---|---|---|---|
| Alder Dam | Pierce County | 46°48′06″N 122°18′37″W | Nisqually River | 50 | Tacoma Power | 1945 | |
| Bonneville Dam | Skamania County; Multnomah County, Oregon (Note: Electricity generated in Oregon.) | 45°38′39″N 121°56′28″W | Columbia River | 1,093 | United States Army Corps of Engineers | 1938, 1981 | |
| Boundary Dam | Metaline Falls, Washington | 48°59′14″N 117°20′52″W | Pend Oreille River | 1,024 | Seattle City Light | 1967 | |
| Box Canyon Dam | Ione, Washington | 48°46′51″N 117°25′06″W | Pend Oreille River | 90 | Pend Oreille PUD | 1955 | |
| Cedar Falls Dam | Cedar Falls, Washington | 47°25′09″N 121°46′55″W | Cedar River | 30 | Seattle City Light | 1921, 1929 | |
| Chief Joseph Dam | Douglas County; Okanogan County | 47°59′42″N 119°38′25″W | Columbia River | 2,620 | United States Army Corps of Engineers | 1958, 1973 | |
| Cowlitz Falls Dam | Lewis County | 46°27′58″N 122°06′35″W | Cowlitz River | 70 | Lewis County Public Utilities District | 1994 | |
| Cushman Dam No. 1 | Mason County | 47°25′05″N 123°13′31″W | Skokomish River | 43 | Tacoma Power | 1926 | |
| Cushman Dam No. 2 | Mason County | 47°22′11″N 123°09′37″W | Skokomish River | 81 | Tacoma Power | 1930–1931, 1952, 2013 | |
| Diablo Dam | Whatcom County | 48°42′50″N 121°07′54″W | Skagit River | 159 | Seattle City Light | 1936–1937 | |
| Electron Hydroelectric Project | Pierce County | 46°59′28″N 122°10′30″W | Puyallup River | 26 | Electron Hydro, LLC. | 1904, 1929 | |
| Gorge Dam | Whatcom County | 48°41′53″N 121°12′31″W | Skagit River | 199 | Seattle City Light | 1924, 1929, 1951 | |
| Grand Coulee Dam | Grant County; Okanogan County | 47°57′27″N 118°58′38″W | Columbia River | 6,809 (Note: Includes 314 MW pumped-storage.) | United States Bureau of Reclamation | 1941, 1975 | |
| Henry M. Jackson Dam | Snohomish County | 47°54′30″N 121°48′52″W | Sultan River | 112 | Snohomish County Public Utility District | 1984 | |
| Ice Harbor Dam | Franklin County; Walla Walla County | 46°14′59″N 118°52′47″W | Snake River | 603 | United States Army Corps of Engineers | 1962, 1975–1976 | |
| Lake Chelan Dam | Chelan, Washington | 47°50′05″N 120°00′48″W | Chelan River | 62.1 | Chelan County Public Utility District | 1927–1928 | |
| LaGrande Dam | Pierce County | 46°49′58″N 122°19′11″W | Nisqually River | 64 | Tacoma Power | 1912, 1945 | |
| Little Goose Dam | Columbia County; Whitman County | 46°35′02″N 118°01′38″W | Snake River | 932 | United States Army Corps of Engineers | 1970–1971, 1978 | |
| Long Lake Dam | Lincoln County | 47°50′04″N 117°50′10″W | Spokane River | 71 | Avista Utilities | 1915, 1919, 1924 | |
| Lower Baker Dam | Skagit County | 48°32′52″N 121°44′27″W | Baker River | 79 | Puget Sound Energy | 1960, 2013 | |
| Lower Granite Dam | Garfield County; Whitman County | 46°39′34″N 117°25′46″W | Snake River | 932 | United States Army Corps of Engineers | 1975, 1978 | |
| Lower Monumental Dam | Franklin County; Walla Walla County | 46°33′49″N 118°32′23″W | Snake River | 932 | United States Army Corps of Engineers | 1969–1970, 1979 | |
| Mayfield Dam | Lewis County | 46°30′13″N 122°35′19″W | Cowlitz River | 162 | Tacoma Power | 1963, 1983 | |
| Merwin Dam | Clark County; Cowlitz County | 45°57′24″N 122°33′16″W | Lewis River | 136 | PacifiCorp | 1931–1932, 1949, 1958 | |
| Mossyrock Dam | Lewis County | 46°32′05″N 122°25′29″W | Cowlitz River | 300 | Tacoma Power | 1968 | |
| Priest Rapids Dam | Grant County; Yakima County | 46°38′42″N 119°54′29″W | Columbia River | 955 | Grant County Public Utility District | 1959–1961 | |
| Rock Island Dam | Chelan County; Douglas County | 47°20′46″N 120°05′30″W | Columbia River | 660 | Chelan County Public Utility District | 1931–1932, 1952–1953, 1978–1979 | |
| Rocky Reach Dam | Chelan County; Douglas County | 47°32′01″N 120°17′43″W | Columbia River | 1,300 | Chelan County Public Utility District | 1961, 1973–1974 | |
| Ross Dam | Whatcom County | 48°43′57″N 121°04′04″W | Skagit River | 353 | Seattle City Light | 1952–1956 | |
| Snoqualmie Falls Hydroelectric Plant | Snoqualmie, Washington | 47°32′24″N 121°50′13″W | Snoqualmie River | 54 | Puget Sound Energy | 1898, 1957, 2013 | |
| Swift Dam | Skamania County | 46°03′39″N 122°12′06″W; 46°03′34″N 122°15′34″W | Lewis River | 240 | PacifiCorp | 1958–1959 | |
| Upper Baker Dam | Whatcom County | 48°38′56″N 121°41′27″W | Baker River | 91 | Puget Sound Energy | 1959 | |
| Wanapum Dam | Grant County; Kittitas County | 46°52′23″N 119°58′13″W | Columbia River | 1,038 | Grant County Public Utility District | 2011–2018 | |
| Wells Dam | Chelan County; Douglas County | 47°56′49″N 119°51′55″W | Columbia River | 851 | Douglas County Public Utility District | 1967–1969 | |
| Wynoochee Dam | Grays Harbor County | 47°23′06″N 123°36′19″W | Wynoochee River | 12.8 | Tacoma Power | 1994 | |
| Yale Dam | Clark County; Cowlitz County | 45°57′46″N 122°20′08″W | Lewis River | 134 | PacifiCorp | 1953 | |

=== Wind ===
| Name | Location | Coordinates | Capacity (MW) | Year opened | Ref |
|---|---|---|---|---|---|
| Wild Horse Wind Farm | Kittitas County | 47°01′07″N 120°12′58″W | 273 | 2006, 2009 | |
| Marengo Wind Farm | Columbia County | 46°22′27″N 117°46′36″W | 211 | 2007, 2008 | |
| White Creek Wind Farm | Klickitat County | 46°43′36″N 120°50′02″W | 205 | 2007 | |
| Big Horn Wind Farm | Klickitat County | 45°45′22″N 120°48′31″W | 200 | 2006 | |
| Big Horn 2 | Klickitat County | 45°45′22″N 120°48′31″W | 50 | 2011 | |
| Palouse Wind Farm | Whitman County | 47°09′21″N 117°21′52″W | 105 | 2012 | |
| Stateline Wind Farm (Vansycle Wind) | Walla Walla County | 46°02′14″N 118°48′24″W | 177 | 2001 | |
| Hopkins Ridge Wind Farm | Columbia County | 46°24′07″N 117°48′44″W | 157 | 2005, 2008 | |
| Harvest Wind Farm | Klickitat County | 45°48′51″N 120°20′50″W | 99 | 2009 | |
| Nine Canyon Wind Farm | Benton County | 46°06′14″N 119°08′54″W | 99 | 2002 | |
| Goodnoe Hills Wind Farm | Klickitat County | 45°46′46″N 120°31′25″W | 94 | 2008 | |
| Coastal Energy | Grays Harbor County | 46°47′38″N 124°04′01″W | 6 | 2010 | |
| Lower Snake River Wind Project | Garfield County | 46°28′46″N 117°37′50″W | 342.7 | 2012 | |
| Juniper Canyon | Klickitat County | 45°54′08″N 120°12′26″W | 151.2 | 2011 | |
| Kittitas Valley Wind Farm (Sagebrush Wind) | Kittitas County | 47°9′14″N 120°40′43″W | 100.8 | 2010 | |
| Vantage Wind Power Project | Kittitas County | 46°57′15″N 120°11′09″W | 90 | 2010 | |
| Linden Ranch | Klickitat County | 45°44′34″N 120°46′56″W | 50 | 2010 | |
| Windy Flats | Klickitat County | 45°44′31″N 120°43′32″W | 262.4 | 2009 | |
| Windy Point (Tuolumne Wind) | Klickitat County | 45°45′57″N 120°39′07″W | 137.6 | 2009 | |
| Tucannon River Wind Farm | Dayton, Washington | 46°28′26″N 117°35′48″W | 267 | 2014 | |
| Swauk Valley Ranch Wind | Kittitas County | 47°8′30″N 120°45′15″W | 4.3 | 2012 | |
| Skookumchuck Wind Farm | Lewis County; Thurston County | 46°44′23″N 122°38′14″W | 136 | 2020 | |

=== Solar ===
Only utility scale projects larger than 1 MW are listed.

| Name | Location | Coordinates | Capacity (MW_{AC}) | Year opened | Ref |
|---|---|---|---|---|---|
| Adams Nielson Solar Farm | Adams County | 46°57′19″N 118°37′16″W | 28 | 2018 | |
| Camas Solar Project | Kittitas County | | 6.7 | 2022 | |
| Horn Rapids Solar | Benton County | | 4 | 2020 | |
| Lund Hill Solar Project | Klickitat County | 45°53′46″N 120°16′23″W | 194 | 2022 | |
| Penstemon Solar Project | Kittitas County | | 6.7 | 2022 | |
| Urtica Solar Project | Kittitas County | | 6.7 | 2022 | |

=== Municipal solid waste (MSW) combustion ===
| Name | Location | Coordinates | Capacity (MW) | Year opened | Ref |
|---|---|---|---|---|---|
| Spokane Waste to Energy (WTE) Facility | Spokane County | 47°37′35″N 117°30′17″W | 22 | 1991 | |

== Former facilities ==
| Station | Location | Type | Capacity (MW) | Status | Year opened | Year closed | Ref |
|---|---|---|---|---|---|---|---|
| Satsop Nuclear Power Plant | Grays Harbor County | Nuclear | 2480 | Canceled | N/A | 1977 | |
| Condit Hydroelectric Project | Klickitat County | Hydroelectric | 14.7 | Demolished | 1913 | 2011 | |
| Elwha Dam | Clallam County | Hydroelectric | 14.8 | Demolished | 1913 | 2012 | |
| Glines Canyon Dam | Clallam County | Hydroelectric | 13.3 | Demolished | 1927 | 2014 | |

== See also ==
- List of power stations in the United States
