= List of onshore wind farms =

Worldwide installed capacity (1996–2015)

This is a list of the largest onshore wind farms that are currently operational, rated by generating capacity. Also listed are onshore wind farms with notability other than size, and largest proposed projects.

== Largest operational onshore wind farms ==
Wind farm locations

This is a list of the onshore wind farms that are larger than 250 MW in current nameplate capacity. Many of these wind farms have been built in stages, and construction of a further stage may be continuing at some of these sites.

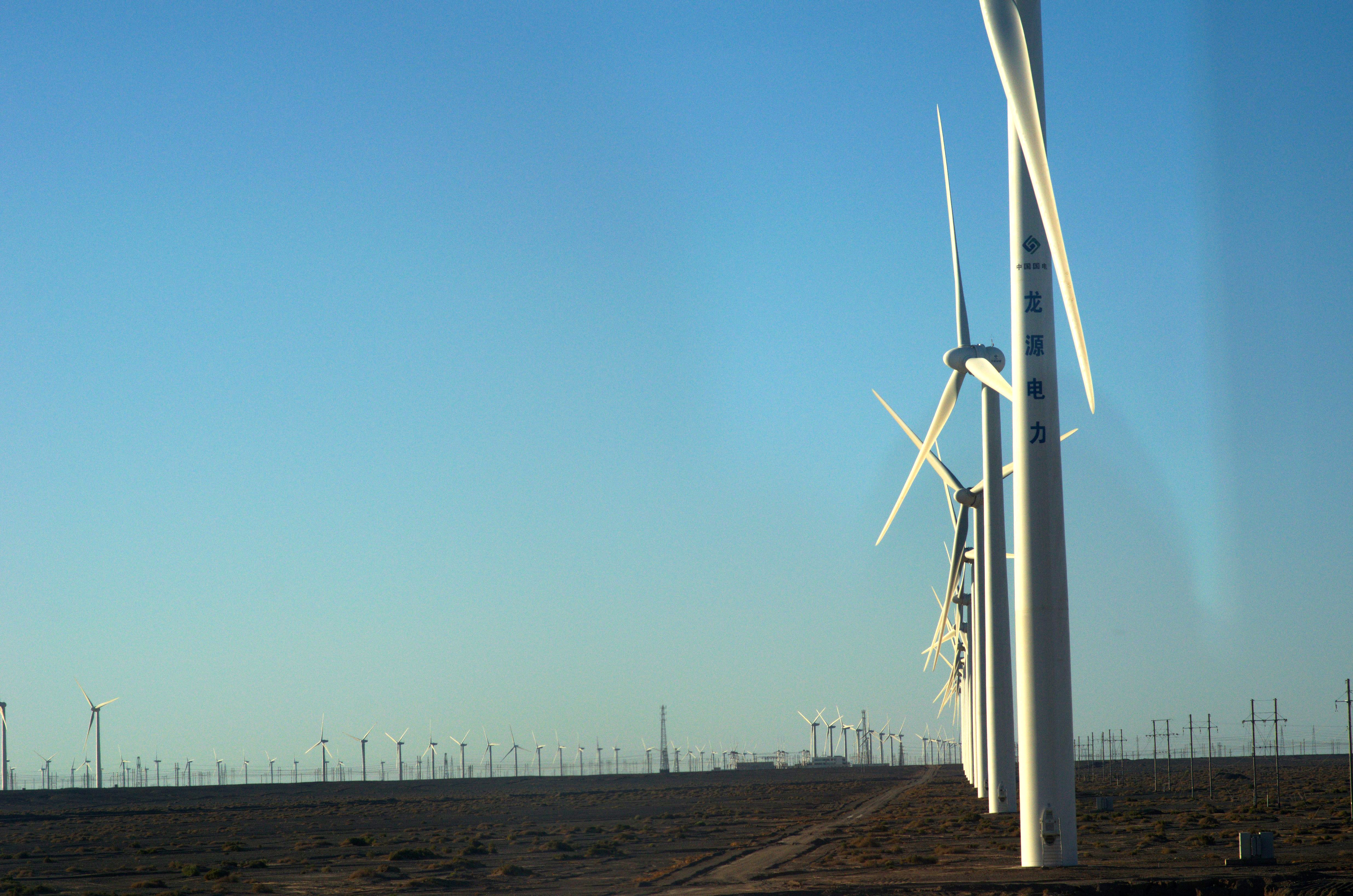
The Gansu Guazhou Wind Farm in China is the largest wind farm in the world, with a target capacity of 20,000 MW by 2020.

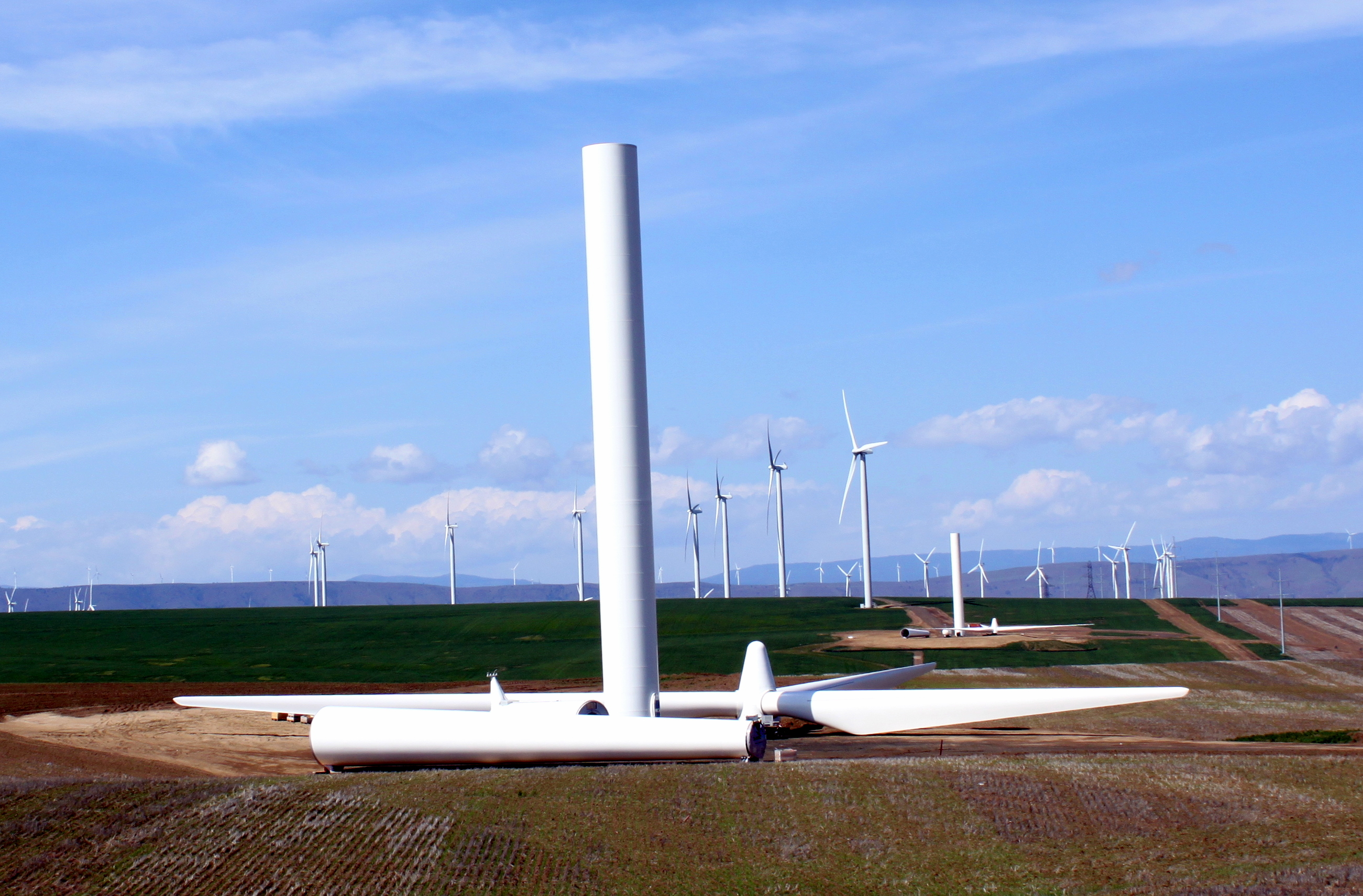
Part of the Biglow Canyon Wind Farm, with a turbine under construction

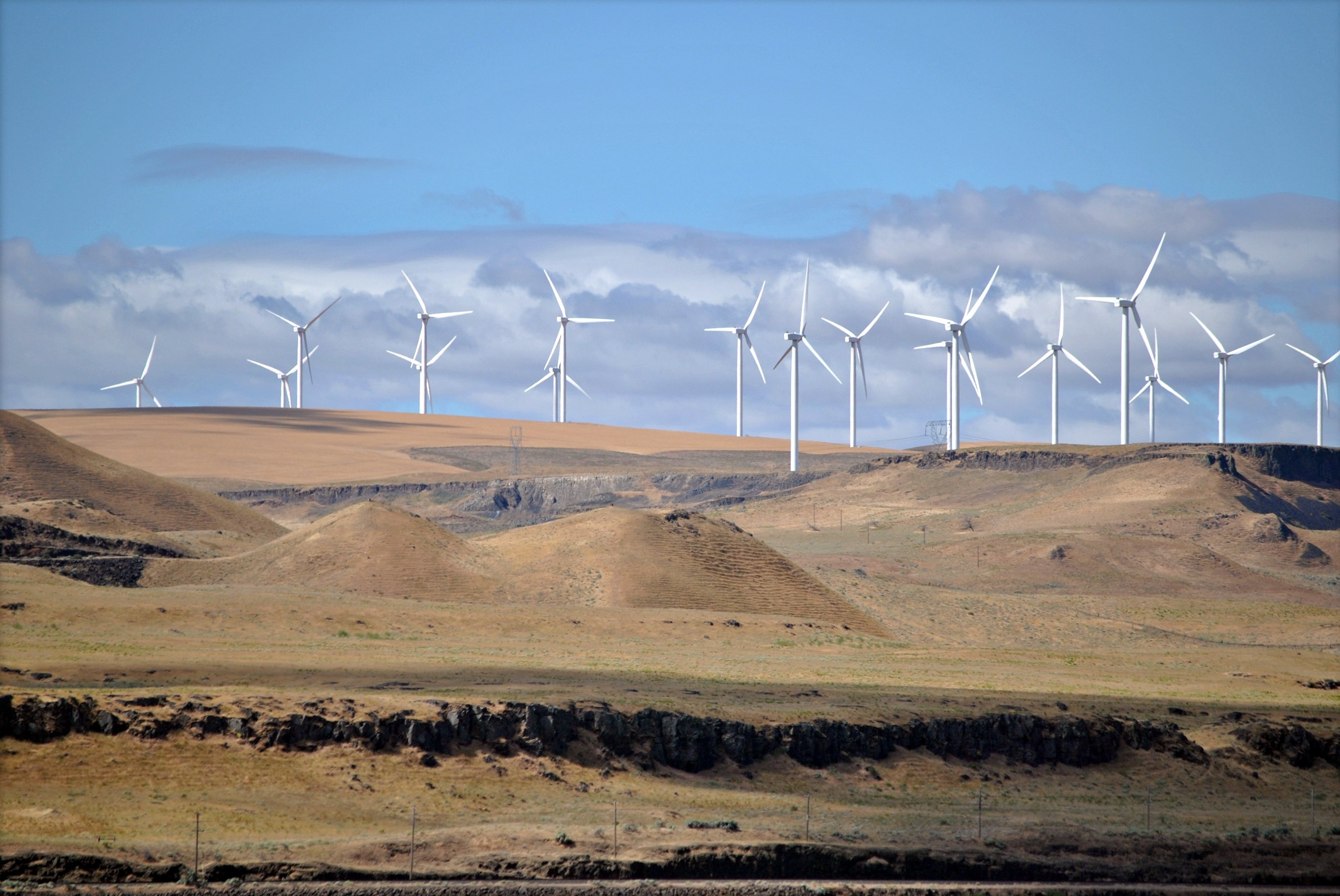
The Shepherds Flat Wind Farm is an 845 megawatt (MW) wind farm in the U.S. state of Oregon.

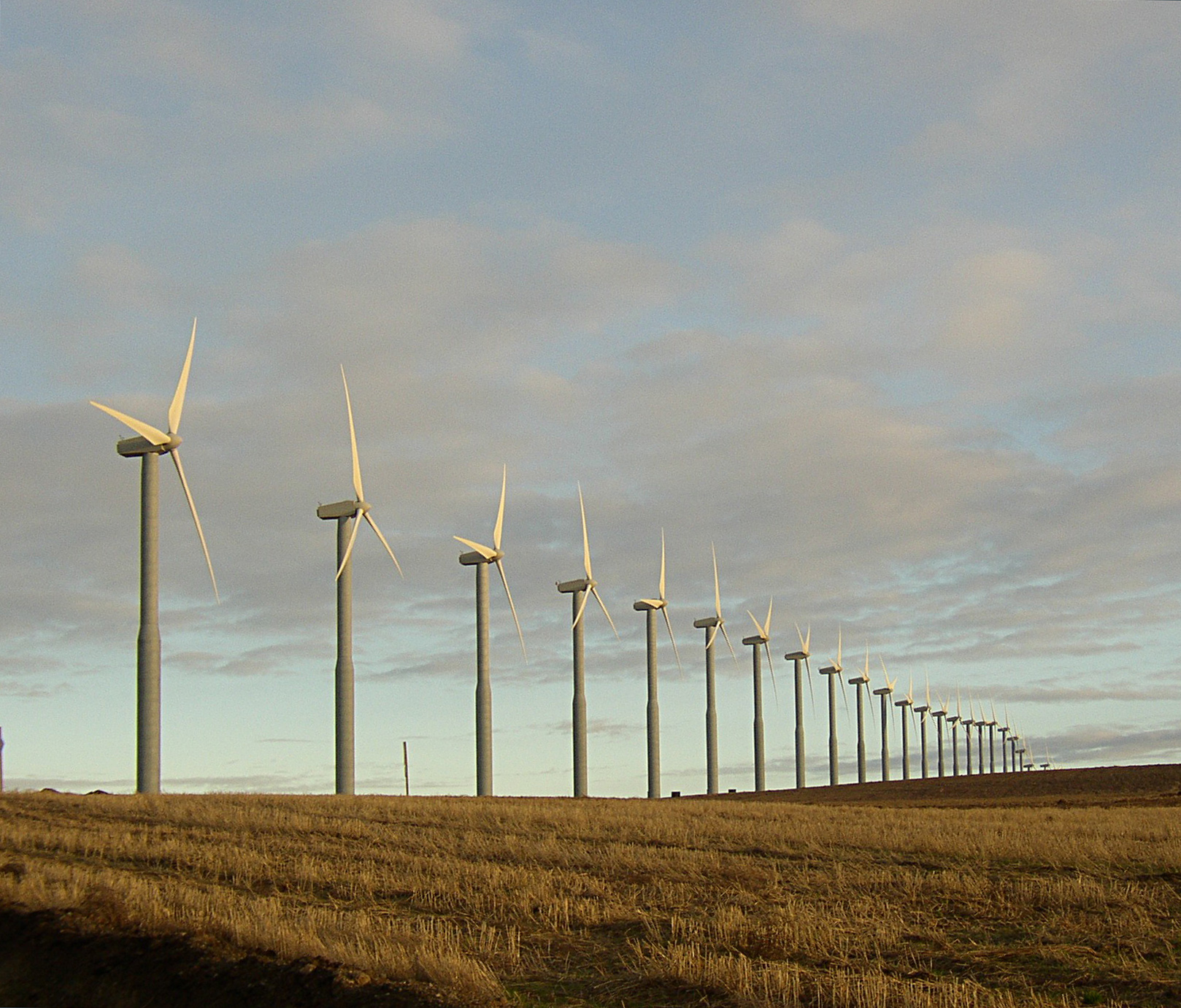
Stateline Wind Farm turbines near the Walla Walla River

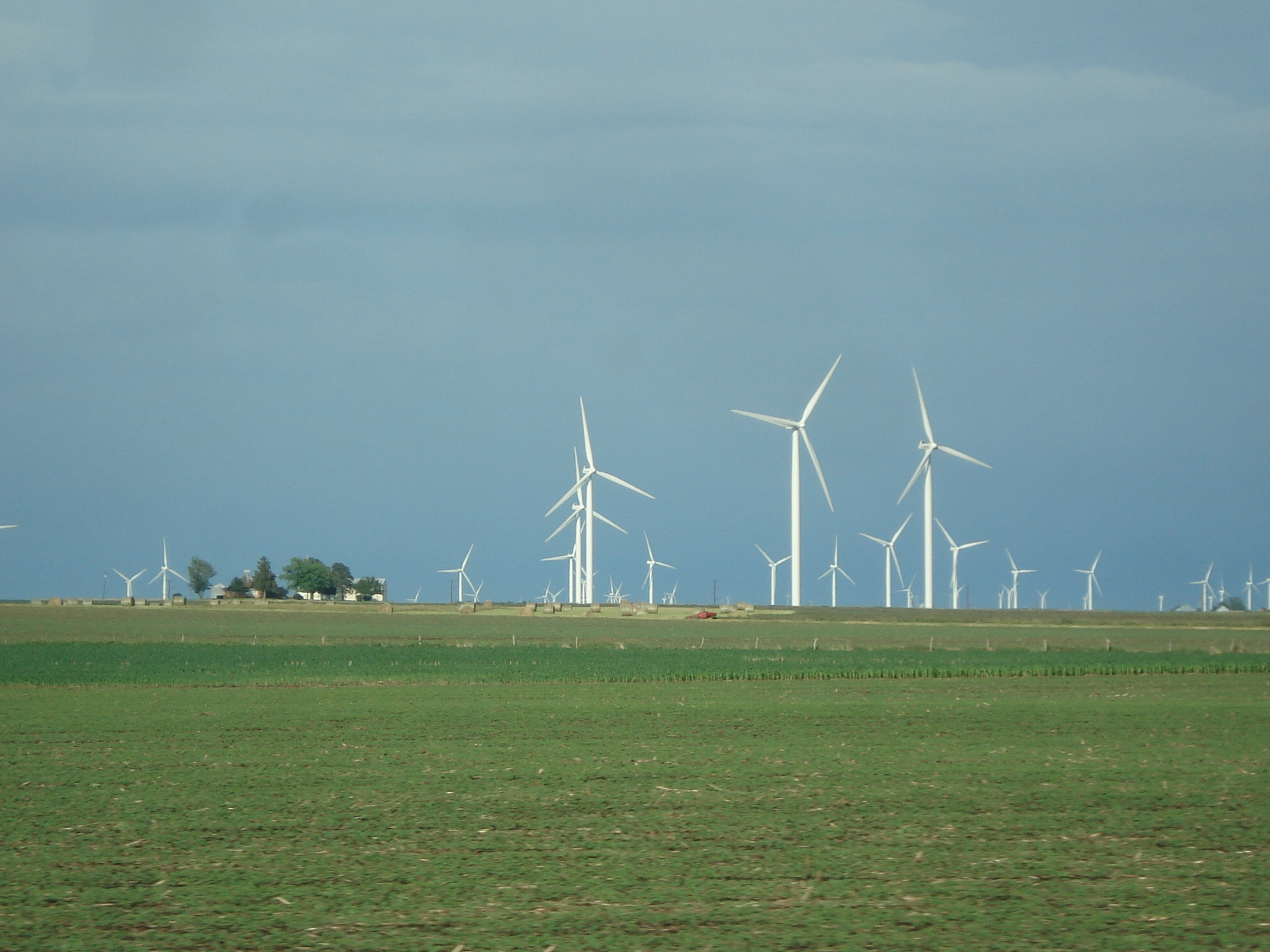
Twin Groves Wind Farm from McLean County Route 21

| Wind farm | Country | State/ province | Coordinates | Current capacity (MW) | Notes/refs |
|---|---|---|---|---|---|
| Xinjiang Hami Wind Farm | China | Xinjiang | 42.224804°N 93.90246°E | 11,947 | |
| Gansu Guazhou Wind Farm | China | Gansu | 40°12′N 96°54′E | 10,450 | Multiple farms |
| Hinggan League Wind Farm | China | Inner Mongolia | 45.9543°N 120.5038°E | 3,000 | |
| Dabancheng Wind Farm | China | Xinjiang | 43°35′37″N 87°48′32″E | 2,500 | |
| Qingyang Huanxian Huaneng Wind Farm | China | Gansu | 36.4635°N 106.6114°E | 2,270 | |
| Mori Wind Farm Complex | China | Xinjiang | 44.1849°N 90.6602°E | 2,200 | |
| Markbygden Wind Farm | Sweden | Norrbotten | 65°25′N 20°40′E | 2,007 | |
| Tenggeli Desert Wind Farm | China | Ningxia | 37.578°N 105.013°E | 1,800 | |
| Togtoh Wind Farms | China | Inner Mongolia | 39.8472°N 111.9168°E | 1,750 | |
| Wulanchabu Grid Friendly Wind Farm | China | Inner Mongolia | 41.879°N 111.2757°E | 1,700 | |
| Alashanzuo Banner Aolunbulage Wind Farm | China | Inner Mongolia | 43.2443°N 114.3252°E | 1,600 | |
| Shangdu Huaneng Beifang Wind Farm | China | Inner Mongolia | 42.2419°N 115.9875°E | 1,600 | |
| Alta Wind Energy Center | (United States) USA | California | 35°1′16″N 118°19′14″W | 1,548 | |
| Muppandal Wind Farm | India | Tamil Nadu | 8°15′27.45″N 77°32′23.21″E | 1,500 | |
| Urad Middle Banner Mengneng Wind Farm | China | Inner Mongolia | 41.753°N 108.445°E | 1,500 | |
| Horqin Wind Farm | China | Inner Mongolia | 43.7297°N 122.7945°E | 1,380 | |
| Hainan Prefecture Qieji 1 & 2 Wind Farm | China | Qinghai | 36.3149°N 99.6815°E | 1,300 | |
| Minqin Hongshagang Wind Farm | China | Gansu | 39.1459°N 102.2668°E | 1,300 | |
| Altai (SPIC) Wind Farm | China | Xinjiang | 47.9126°N 88.2741°E | 1,200 | |
| Haiyuan Caowa Wind Farm | China | Ningxia | 36.4471°N 105.7828°E | 1,100 | |
| Mile West Wind Farm | China | Yunnan | 24.1932°N 103.4019°E | 1,095 | |
| Jaisalmer Wind Park | India | Rajasthan | 26°56′27.45″N 70°53′23.21″E | 1,064 | multiple farms |
| Fosen Vind Wind Farm | Norway | Trøndelag | 63°43′0″N 10°15′0″E | 1,057 | Six farms |
| Western Spirit Wind Farm | (United States) USA | New Mexico | 34.2569°N 105.3316°W | 1,050 | |
| Western Spirit Wind Farm | (United States) USA | New Mexico | 34.2569°N 105.3316°W | 1,050 | |
| Dongsu Bayanwula Wind Farm | China | Inner Mongolia | 43.8591°N 113.6508°E | 1,000 | |
| Hexigten Banner Wind Farm | China | Inner Mongolia | 43.195°N 118.233°E | 1,000 | |
| Mori Dongfang Wind Farm | China | Xinjiang | 43.7078°N 91.161°E | 1,000 | |
| Turpan Huaneng Wind Farm | China | Xinjiang | 43.056°N 88.686°E | 1,000 | |
| Tongliao Kezuohou Banner Wind Farm | China | Inner Mongolia | 43.3685°N 123.0848°E | 1,000 | |
| Taonan Xiangyang Wind Farm | China | Jilin | 45.2147°N 123.0667°E | 1,000 | |
| Tongliao Wind Farms | China | Inner Mongolia | 44.5024°N 121.4484°E | 1,000 | |
| Siziwang Banner Wind Farm | China | Inner Mongolia | 41.5519°N 111.6777°E | 1,000 | |
| Xilinhaote Taifu Wind Farm | China | Inner Mongolia | 44.2843°N 115.9637°E | 1,000 | |
| MacIntyre Wind Farm | Australia | Queensland | 28.2163°S 152.0327°E | 923 | |
| Yumen Changma Wind Farm | China | Gansu | 40.205°N 96.8501°E | 1,000 | |
| Traverse Wind Farm | (United States) USA | Oklahoma | 35.7431°N 98.6726°W | 998 | |
| Fuyuan West Wind Farm | China | Yunnan | 25.6836°N 104.0978°E | 947.4 | |
| Los Vientos Wind Farm | (United States) USA | Texas | 26°19′51″N 97°35′09″W | 912 | |
| Qiubei Jinping West Wind Farm | China | Yunnan | 24.0402°N 104.1948°E | 880 | |
| Shepherds Flat Wind Farm | (United States) USA | Oregon | 45°42′00″N 120°3′36″W | 845 | |
| Urumqi Dabancheng Wind Farm | China | Xinjiang | 43.652°N 87.821°E | 801.95 | |
| Meadow Lake Wind Farm | (United States) USA | Indiana | 40°36′4″N 86°51′57″W | 801 | |
| Huade Wind Farm | China | Inner Mongolia | 41.8481°N 113.8505°E | 800 | |
| Huolinhe Wind Farm | China | Inner Mongolia | 45.5368°N 119.551°E | 800 | |
| Mulei Sishige Jingzi Wind Farm | China | Xinjiang | 44.292°N 90.627°E | 800 | |
| Urumqi Huadian Wind Farm | China | Xinjiang | 43.4674°N 88.3705°E | 800 | |
| Roscoe Wind Farm | (United States) USA | Texas | 32°15′52″N 100°20′39″W | 781.5 | |
| Luxi Yongning Wind Farm | China | Yunnan | 24.5305°N 103.7701°E | 750 | |
| Horse Hollow Wind Energy Center | (United States) USA | Texas | 32°11′24″N 100°01′48″W | 735.5 | |
| Ventos de Santa Luzia Wind Farm | Brazil | Bahia | 12.6816°S 42.0497°W | 724.5 | |
| Lagoa dos Ventos Wind Farm | Brazil | Piauí | 29.9571°S 50.3158°W | 716 | |
| Tehachapi Pass Wind Farm | (United States) USA | California | 35°06′08″N 118°16′58″W | 705 | multiple farms |
| Lingwu Ningdong Huadian Wind Farm | China | Ningxia | 37.7217°N 106.575°E | 692 | |
| Hordavind Wind Farm | Norway | Vestland | 60.8574°N 5.7661°E | 682 | |
| Puyang Huaneng Wind Farm | China | Henan | 35.4583°N 115.125°E | 650 | |
| San Gorgonio Pass Wind Farm | (United States) USA | California | 33°54′53.53″N 116°35′18.35″W | 615 | Multiple farms |
| Peñascal Wind Power Project | (United States) USA | Texas | 27°00′N 97°36′W | 605.2 | |
| Yumen Qiduntan 1 Wind Farm | China | Gansu | 40.4698°N 97.3354°E | 604 | |
| Limon Wind Energy Center | (United States) USA | Colorado | 39°22′51″N 103°34′23″W | 601 | |
| Fântânele-Cogealac Wind Farm | Romania | Constanța | 44°35′25″N 28°33′55″E | 600 | |
| Gaotai Beibutan Wind Farm | China | Gansu | 39.844°N 99.394°E | 600 | |
| Kailu Mingyang Wind Farm | China | Inner Mongolia | 43.7771°N 121.3738°E | 600 | |
| Chu Se Wind Farm | Vietnam | Đắk Lắk | 12.6874°N 108.0549°E | 700 | |
| Rush Creek Wind Project | (United States) USA | Colorado | 39°10′20″N 103°50′43″W | 600 | |
| Tongxin Ningxia Guobo Wind Farm | China | Ningxia | 36.9055°N 106.2185°E | 600 | |
| Wulanchabu Hongge'er Wind Farm | China | Inner Mongolia | 41.855°N 111.961°E | 600 | |
| Wulanchabu Xingfu Wind Farm | China | Inner Mongolia | 42.1998°N 112.521°E | 600 | |
| Yumen Mahuangtan 1 Wind Farm | China | Gansu | 40.5136°N 97.2734°E | 600 | |
| Jhimpir Power Wind Farm | Thailand | Chaiyaphum | 15.5382°N 101.5644°E | 600 | |
| Fowler Ridge Wind Farm | (United States) USA | Indiana | 40°36′31″N 87°19′15″W | 599.8 | |
| Jimunai Complex Wind Farm | China | Xinjiang | 47.651°N 85.679°E | 590 | |
| Sweetwater Wind Farm | (United States) USA | Texas | 32°20′20″N 100°26′40″W | 585.3 | |
| Gabal El-Zeit Wind Farm | Egypt | Red Sea | 25.8577°N 34.4182°E | 580 | |
| Altamont Pass Wind Farm | (United States) USA | California | 37°43′57″N 121°39′9″W | 576 | multiple farms |
| Flat Ridge Wind Farm | (United States) USA | Kansas | 37°21′59″N 98°15′40″W | 570.4 | |
| Baotou Huadian Wind Farm | China | Inner Mongolia | 42.5199°N 110.2776°E | 570 | |
| Oitis Wind Farm | Brazil | Piauí | 9.0051°S 41.7274°W | 566.5 | |
| Capricorn Ridge Wind Farm | (United States) USA | Texas | 31°54′11″N 100°54′04″W | 551 | |
| Kailu Jianhua 2 Wind Farm | China | Inner Mongolia | 44.0579°N 121.307°E | 550 | |
| Qianguo Angge Wind Farm | China | Jilin | 44.3639°N 124.0856°E | 550 | |
| Tengxian Dali Wind Farm | China | Guangxi | 23.9623°N 110.432°E | 550 | |
| Frontier 1 & 2 Wind Farm | (United States) USA | Oklahoma | 36.8357°N 97.2494°W | 550 | multiple farms (2) |
| Kaiyuan Xianrendongpo Wind Farm | China | Yunnan | 23.7878°N 103.1613°E | 545 | |
| Zafarana Wind Farm | Egypt | Red Sea Governorate | 29.2003°N 32.5981°E | 545 | |
| Tiruppur Wind Farm | India | Tamil Nadu | 11.0547°N 77.3341°E | 540 | |
| Whitelee Wind Farm | (United Kingdom) UK | East Renfrewshire, Scotland | 55°41′14″N 4°13′43″W | 539 | |
| Rio Do Vento Wind Farm | Brazil | Rio Grande do Norte | 5.7617°S 36.0959°W | 534.2 | |
| Stockyard Hill Wind Farm | Australia | Victoria | 37.5542°S 143.3033°E | 530 | |
| Brahamvel Wind Farm | India | Maharashtra | 21.1943°N 74.3919°E | 528 | |
| Buffalo Gap Wind Farm | (United States) USA | Texas | 32°18′38″N 100°8′57″W | 523.3 | |
| Clyde Wind Farm | (United Kingdom) UK | South Lanarkshire, Scotland | 55°28′02″N 3°39′16″W | 522 | |
| Rosepetal Wind Farm | India | Rajasthan | 25.1862°N 75.8589°E | 510 | |
| Rio Do Vento 2 Wind Farm | Brazil | Rio Grande do Norte | 5.8908°S 35.9608°W | 504 | |
| Highland Wind Energy Center | (United States) USA | Iowa | 43°05′N 95°34′W | 501.4 | |
| Abaga Banner (China Resources) Wind Farm | China | Inner Mongolia | 44.1633°N 114.8816°E | 500 | |
| Abaga Banner (State Power Investment) Wind Farm | China | Inner Mongolia | 43.7371°N 115.5687°E | 500 | |
| Chagannaoer Sonid Left Banner Wind Farm | China | Inner Mongolia | 44.3146°N 112.7343°E | 500 | |
| Changling (Shandong Development Investment) Wind Farm | China | Jilin | 44.2788°N 123.9776°E | 500 | |
| Changling Santuan Wind Farm | China | Jilin | 44.4308°N 123.6926°E | 500 | |
| Da'an Huaneng Wind Farm | China | Jilin | 45.0915°N 123.6021°E | 500 | |
| Dabancheng Huadian Wind Farm | China | Xinjiang | 43.336°N 88.124°E | 500 | |
| Henan Mangya Wind Farm | China | Qinghai | 38.7359°N 93.3301°E | 500 | |
| Mangya Lenghu Wind Farm | China | Qinghai | 38.8674°N 92.4631°E | 500 | |
| Mongolia Baotou Aluminum Park Wind Farm | China | Inner Mongolia | 40.581°N 110.143°E | 500 | |
| Qian'an Wind Farm | China | Jilin | 45.0046°N 124.0292°E | 500 | |
| Ruoqiang Wind Farm | China | Xinjiang | 39.441°N 88.391°E | 500 | |
| Sunitezuo Banner (Shenzhen Energy) Wind Farm | China | Inner Mongolia | 44.1833°N 113.8001°E | 500 | |
| Sunitezuo Banner Dongsudasa Wind Farm | China | Inner Mongolia | 43.302°N 112.435°E | 500 | |
| Tacheng Tuoli Tianrun Wind Farm | China | Xinjiang | 46.086°N 84.108°E | 500 | |
| Tongyu Shuifa Wind Farm | China | Jilin | 45.0136°N 122.7215°E | 500 | |
| Urad Middle Banner Ganqimaodu Wind Farm | China | Inner Mongolia | 42.4032°N 107.5653°E | 500 | |
| Xinghe Tianjie Wind Farm | China | Inner Mongolia | 40.6369°N 113.8436°E | 500 | |
| Zhongwei Xiangshan Wind Farm | China | Ningxia | 37.0837°N 105.3083°E | 500 | |
| Bash Wind Farm | Uzbekistan | Bukhara | 40.6577°N 64.7129°E | 500 | |
| Dzhankeldy Wind Farm | Uzbekistan | Bukhara | 40.8838°N 63.3801°E | 500 | |
| Cheyenne Ridge Wind Farm | (United States) USA | Colorado | 39.0453°N 102.9403°W | 500 | |
| Fengning Senjitu Wind Farm | China | Hebei | 41.7654°N 116.3697°E | 498 | |
| Buffalo Plains Wind Farm | Canada | Alberta | 50.3646°N 112.7201°W | 494 | |
| Serra do Assuruá Wind Farm | Brazil | Bahia | 11.5366°S 42.5549°W | 490.5 | |
| Adamdel Wind Farm | Romania | Constanta | 45.9852°N 24.6859°E | 484 | |
| Xilinhaote Wudalai Wind Farm | China | Inner Mongolia | 44.23281°N 116.1334°E | 476 | |
| Nysäter Wind Farm | Sweden | Västernorrland | 62.7681°N 17.2968°E | 475.5 | |
| Chafariz Wind Farm | Brazil | Paraíba | 7.0508°S 36.9679°W | 471.9 | |
| Malong Tongquan Wind Farm | China | Yunnan | 25.4351°N 103.578°E | 471.3 | |
| Las Majas Wind Farm | Spain | Aragon | 41.2680°N 0.9360°W | 465 | |
| Cajuina Wind Farm | Brazil | Rio Grande do Norte | 5.6809°S 36.3030°W | 461.7 | |
| Panther Creek Wind Farm | (United States) USA | Texas | 31°58′7″N 99°54′6″W | 458 | |
| Ventos de São Zacarias Wind Farm | Brazil | Piauí | 7.7201°S 40.7153°W | 456.0 | |
| Subei Mazongshan Yinmaxia Wind Farm | China | Gansu | 41.312°N 96.902°E | 455 | |
| Coopers Gap Wind Farm | Australia | Queensland | 26.743°S 151.45°E, | 453 | |
| Clarke Creek Wind Farm | Australia | Central Queensland | 22.8505°S 149.4532°E | 450 | |
| Kangbao Jingneng Wind Farm | China | Hebei | 40.8814°N 116.0921°E | 450 | |
| Hainan Mohe Gonghe Wind Farm | China | Qinghai | 36.4584°N 99.7185°E | 450 | |
| Dongtai Guohua Wind Farm | China | Jiangsu | 32.6597°N 120.9031°E | 450 | |
| Fubei Wind Farm | China | Liaoning | 42.3280°N 121.4953°E | 450 | |
| Biglow Canyon Wind Farm | (United States) USA | Oregon | 45°38′15″N 120°36′19″W | 450 | |
| Rolling Hills Wind Farm | (United States) USA | Iowa | 41°18′N 94°47′W | 443.9 | |
| Viking Wind Farm (United Kingdom) | United Kingdom | Scotland | 60.3393°N 1.2084°W | 443 | |
| Ordos Industrial Park Wind Farm | China | Inner Mongolia | 39.2409°N 109.828°E | 440 | |
| Cabo Leones Wind Farm | Chile | Atacama | 28.9950°S 70.3738°W | 431 | |
| Peetz Wind Farm | (United States) USA | Colorado | 40°57′3″N 103°9′19″W | 430 | |
| Luoping West Wind Farm | China | Yunnan | 24.8811°N 104.3119°E | 427.8 | |
| Delta Maranhão Wind Farm | Brazil | Maranhão | 2.7058°S 42.5336°W | 426.0 | |
| Reynosa Wind Farm | Mexico | Tamaulipas | 25.6956°N 98.2306°E | 424 | |
| Blue Canyon Wind Farm | (United States) USA | Oklahoma | 34°51′37″N 98°34′57″W | 423.4 | |
| Santo Agostinho Wind Farm | Brazil | Rio Grande do Norte | 5.5848°S 36.2348°W | 421.6 | |
| Macarthur Wind Farm | Australia | Victoria | 38°2′24″S 142°11′30″E | 420 | |
| Novo Horizonte Wind Farm | Brazil | Bahia | 12.5779°S 38.0049°W | 420 | |
| Mesquite Star Wind Farm | (United States) USA | Texas | 32.25598°N 100.32031°W | 419 | |
| Ventos Do Piauí 2 & 3 Wind Farm | Brazil | Piauí | 7.9889°S 40.5616°W | 418.5 | |
| Crystal Lake Wind Farm | (United States) USA | Iowa | 43°13′45″N 93°50′28″W | 416 | |
| Oaxaca Wind Farm | Mexico | Oaxaca | 16.5688°N 94.7274°W | 408 | |
| Mutkalampi Wind Farm | Finland | Central Ostrobothnia | 63.9008°N 23.9170°E | 403.8 | |
| Chayouzhong Banner Huitengxile | China | Inner Mongolia | 41.7181°N 112.6019°E | 403 | |
| Urad Rear Banner 3 Wind Farm | China | Inner Mongolia | 41.1364°N 106.4126°E | 403 | |
| Urad Rear Banner 4 Wind Farm | China | Inner Mongolia | 41.2657°N 106.6840°E | 403 | |
| Subei Mazongshan 1 | China | Gansu | 41.8102°N 97.0269°E | 402 | |
| Urad Rear Banner 1 Wind Farm | China | Inner Mongolia | 41.3984°N 106.3205°E | 402 | |
| Xiangyang Wind Farm | China | Jilin | 45.2147°N 123.0667°E | 400.5 | |
| Aftissat Wind Farm | Morocco | Boujdour | 25.7431°N 14.5929°W | 402 | |
| Wulatezhong Banner Wulan Wind Farm | China | Inner Mongolia | 41.8859°N 108.221°E | 400 | |
| Urad Rear Banner 2 Wind Farm | China | Inner Mongolia | 41.8326°N 106.3412°E | 400 | |
| Huanxian Maojing Wind Farm | China | Gansu | 36.5090°N 106.5757°E | 400 | |
| Neihuang Wind Farm | China | Henan | 35.8778°N 114.7909°E | 400 | |
| Mulei Laojunmiao Wind Farm | China | Xinjiang | 44.4791°N 90.6748°E | 400 | |
| Hainan Mohe Wind Farm | China | Qinghai | 36.3149°N 99.6815°E | 400 | |
| Alashanzuo Banner Wuliji Wind Farm | China | Inner Mongolia | 39.0493°N 105.8026°E | 400 | |
| Fuxin Huaneng Wind Farm | China | Liaoning | 42.3733°N 121.4192°E | 400 | |
| Haixi Wind Farm | China | Qinghai | 37.0825°N 95.4597°E | 400 | |
| Heishan Wind Farm | China | Liaoning | 42.0304°N 122.3294°E | 400 | |
| Huadian Kangbao Muchang Wind Farm | China | Hebei | 42.0556°N 114.8036°E | 400 | |
| Lingqiu Wind Farm | China | Shanxi | 39.5376°N 114.3601°E | 400 | |
| Shangdu Huaneng Tanghe Wind Farm | China | Inner Mongolia | 42.2419°N 115.9875°E | 400 | |
| Shizong Danfeng Wind Farm | China | Yunnan | 24.8501°N 103.975°E | 400 | |
| Taipusi Banner (China Resources) Wind Farm | China | Inner Mongolia | 41.9412°N 115.4047°E | 300 | |
| Tongwei Huajialing Yigang Wind Farm | China | Gansu | 35.3750°N 105.1833°E | 400 | |
| Tongyu Liangjingzi Wind Farm | China | Jilin | 42.9995°N 125.9816°E | 400 | |
| Wuchuan Wind Farm | China | Inner Mongolia | 41.3149°N 110.7641°E | 400 | |
| Xianghuang Banner Desegetu Wind Farm | China | Inner Mongolia | 42.2336°N 113.8297°E | 400 | |
| Zhangbei Wind-Solar-Storage Wind Farm | China | Hebei | 41.0495°N 114.4122°E | 400 | |
| Taipusi Banner (Shenzhen Energy) Wind Farm | China | Inner Mongolia | 41.9966°N 115.7256°E | 400 | |
| Guyang Wind Farm | China | Inner Mongolia | 41.0254°N 110.0661°E | 400 | |
| Ea Nam Da Lak Wind Farm | Vietnam | Đắk Lắk | 13.1389°N 108.2548°E | 400 | |
| Oyfjellet Wind Farm | Norway | Nordland | 65.8503°N 13.0094°E | 400 | |
| Dumat Al-Jandal Wind Farm | Saudi Arabia | Al Jouf | 29.9543°N 39.9037°E | 400 | |
| Cimarron Bend Wind Farm | (United States) USA | Kansas | 37°21′18″N 99°59′28″W | 400 | |
| Grande Prairie Wind Farm | (United States) USA | Nebraska | 42°36′29″N 98°25′42″W | 400 | |
| Lone Star Wind Farm | (United States) USA | Texas | 32°16′22.12″N 99°27′22″W | 400 | |
| Windy Point/Windy Flats Wind Farm | (United States) USA | Washington | 45°44′31″N 120°43′32″W | 400 | |
| Alto Sertão 3 Wind Farm | Brazil | Bahia | 13.9811°S 42.6790°W | 399.3 | |
| Chifeng Alukeerqin Banner Talinhua Wind Farm | China | Inner Mongolia | 44.3943°N 119.9194°E | 399 | |
| Siziwang Banner Xingfu Wind Farm | China | Inner Mongolia | 41.2944°N 112.6194°E | 399 | |
| Ventos de São Roque Wind Farm | Brazil | Piauí | 8.9702°S 41.7306°W | 399 | |
| Klondike Wind Farm | (United States) USA | Oregon | 45°34′48″N 120°36′36″W | 399 | |
| Qitai Beitashan Wind Farm | China | Xinjiang | 44.4254°N 89.8779°E | 398 | |
| Rong'An Baiyunling Wind Farm | China | Guangxi | 25.0271°N 109.4385°E | 396 | |
| Eolica Del Sur Wind Farm | Mexico | Oaxaca | 16.4768°N 95.0099°W | 396 | |
| Lagoa Dos Ventos 3 Wind Farm | Brazil | Piauí | 8.7646°S 41.6575°W | 396 | |
| Twin Groves Wind Farm | (United States) USA | Illinois | 40°28′54″N 88°42′26″W | 396 | |
| Alto Sertão 2 Wind Farm | Brazil | Bahia | 14.4770°S 42.5853°W | 386.0 | |
| Hopkins Ridge Wind Farm | (United States) USA | Washington | 46°24′07″N 117°48′44″W | 385 | |
| Serra Da Babilônia Wind Farm | Brazil | Bahia | 11.1204°S 41.3242°W | 382.3 | |
| Papalote Creek Wind Farm | (United States) USA | Texas | 27°58′48″N 97°23′28″W | 380 | |
| Renaico Wind Farm | Chile | Araucanía Region | 37.7245°S 72.5759°W | 376 | |
| Bjornbeget Wind Farm | Sweden | Västernorrland | 62.3244°N 15.7484°E | 372 | |
| Snowtown Wind Farm | Australia | South Australia | 33° 41′ 36″ S, 138° 7′ 51″ E | 370 | |
| Ventos Da Bahia Wind Farm | Brazil | Bahia | 11.9843°S 41.4445°W | 364.1 | |
| Seigneurie De Beaupré Wind Farm | Canada | Quebec | 47.3325°N 70.8281°W | 364 | |
| Campo Largo 2 Wind Farm | Brazil | Bahia | 10.4027°S 41.4464°W | 361.2 | |
| Ventos De São Januário Wind Farm | Brazil | Bahia | 11.0788°S 41.2681°W | 360 | |
| Ventos Do Araripe 3 Wind Farm | Brazil | Piauí | 7.7430°S 40.6752°W | 357.9 | |
| Blakliden Fäbodberget Wind Farm | Sweden | Västerbotten | 64.0250°N 18.1358°E | 353 | |
| Whitla Wind Farm | Canada | Alberta | 51.2333°N 115.6770°W | 353 | |
| Assuruá Wind Farm | Brazil | Bahia | 11.1677°S 42.6849°W | 353 | |
| Morro Do Chapéu Sul 2 Wind Farm | Brazil | Bahia | 11.5869°S 41.3390°W | 352.8 | |
| Umburanas Wind Farm | Brazil | Bahia | 10.5866°S 41.4898°W | 352.5 | |
| Jiyuan Daling Wind Farm | China | Henan | 35.0383°N 112.2373°E | 352.1 | |
| Tangyin Wind Farm | China | Henan | 35.8275°N 114.3316°E | 352 | |
| Keshiketeng Banner Wutaohai Wind Farm | China | Inner Mongolia | 44.1542°N 117.1264°E | 351 | |
| Hallett Wind Farm | Australia | South Australia | 33°22′04″S 138°43′43″E | 351 | |
| Huize Jinzhong Wind Farm | China | Yunnan | 26.4103°N 103.1623°E | 350.4 | |
| Dulan Nuomuhong Wind Farm | China | Qinghai | 36.4343°N 96.4563°E | 350 | |
| Shangyi Qilinshan Wind Farm | China | Hebei | 41.1547°N 113.9858°E | 350 | |
| Pinglu Shitangshan Wind Farm | China | Shanxi | 39.7874°N 112.077°E | 350 | |
| Keshiketeng Banner Shusheng Wind Farm | China | Inner Mongolia | 42.9526°N 118.1228°E | 350 | |
| Dafeng Longyuan Wind Farm | China | Jiangsu | 33.2901°N 120.5836°E | 350 | |
| Kangbao Shenhua Guohua Wind Farm | China | Hebei | 41.775°N 114.5583°E | 350 | |
| Pinglu Baiyushan Wind Farm | China | Shanxi | 39.6347°N 112.1024°E | 350 | |
| Huajialing West Wind Farm | China | Gansu | 35.3867°N 104.9083°E | 350 | |
| Rudong Longyuan Wind Farm | China | Jiangsu | 32.2695°N 121.4357°E | 350 | |
| Aksay Wind Farm | China | Gansu | 39.1874°N 94.2218°E | 350 | |
| Shenchi Nanhuashan Wind Farm | China | Shanxi | 39.3003°N 112.0164°E | 350 | |
| Rivière-Du-Moulin Wind Farm | Canada | Quebec | 47.8952°N 71.0593°W | 350 | |
| Aroeira Wind Farm | Brazil | Bahia | 12.5779°S 38.0049°W | 348.3 | |
| Siping Wind Farm | China | Jilin | 42.9995°N 125.9816°E | 348 | |
| Fântânele Wind Farm | Romania | Constanța | 44.6091°N 28.5670°E | 347 | |
| Folha Larga Norte Wind Farm | Brazil | Bahia | 10.3870°S 40.4589°W | 344.4 | |
| Lower Snake River Wind Farm | (United States) USA | Washington | 46.5542°N 117.8590°E | 343 | |
| Ventos De Santa Eugenia Wind Farm | Brazil | Bahia | 11.3745°S 42.1772°W | 336.3 | |
| Dundonnell Wind Farm | Australia | Victoria | 37.8412°S 142.8759°E | 336 | |
| Hebei Kangbao Wolongshan Wind Farm | China | Hebei | 41.639°N 114.353°E | 330 | |
| GECAMA Wind Farm | Spain | Castilla La Mancha | 39.4826°N 2.1680°W | 329.2 | |
| Pampa Energia Wind Farm | Argentina | Buenos Aires | 38.6583°S 61.9635°W | 327.5 | |
| Rye Park Wind Farm | Australia | New South Wales | 34.6331°S 148.9533°E | 327 | |
| Campo Largo Wind Farm | Brazil | Bahia | 10.4654°S 41.4935°W | 326.7 | |
| Kaiyuan Jianjiaofeng Wind Farm | China | Yunnan | 23.7673°N 103.6168°E | 325 | |
| Pinglu Dashantai Wind Farm | China | Shanxi | 39.6517°N 112.2689°E | 324 | |
| Maple Ridge Wind Farm | (United States) USA | New York | 43°45′N 75°33′W | 321.8 | |
| Koppal (Renew) hybrid Wind Farm | India | Karnataka | 15.3510°N 76.1563°E | 322 | |
| Iberdrola Cogealac Wind Farm | Romania | Dobrega | 45.9852°N 24.6859°E | 322 | |
| Monte Verde Wind Farm | Brazil | Rio Grande do Norte | 5.4924°S 36.2553°W | 319.2 | |
| Hornsdale Wind Farm | Australia | South Australia | 33.058°S 138.544°E | 315 | |
| Soma (Polat) Wind Farm | Turkey | Manisa | 39.2560°N 27.7991°E | 311 | |
| Mesa La Paz Wind Farm | Mexico | Tamaulipas | 23.3304°N 98.8405°W | 310 | |
| Lake Turkana Wind Farm | Kenya | Marsabit County | 2.4891°N 36.7932°E | 310 | |
| Wayra Wind Farm (Peru) | Peru | Ica | 15.0621°S 75.0531°W | 309 | |
| Milford Wind Corridor Wind Farm | (United States) USA | Utah | 38.5315°N 112.9230°E | 306 | |
| Loma Blanca Wind Farm | Argentina | Chubut Province | 43.0136°S 65.1299°W | 304 | |
| Tres Mesas Wind Farm | Mexico | Tamaulipas | 23.3178°N 99.0242°W | 302 | |
| Jenner Wind Farm | Canada | Alberta | 50.7582°N 111.1145°W | 302 | |
| Jiange Wind Farm | China | Sichuan | 32.2987°N 105.7091°E | 301 | |
| Nanhua Daguashan Wind Farm | China | Yunnan | 25.1083°N 100.8917°E | 301 | |
| Prinses Ariane Windpark | Netherlands | Wieringermeer | 52.8173°N 4.9229°E | 301 | |
| Tarfaya Wind Farm | Morocco | Akhfenir | 27.9538°N 11.9975°W | 301 | |
| Pioneer Prairie Wind Farm | (United States) USA | Iowa | 43°28′35″N 92°35′08″W | 300.3 | |
| Wenshan Pingba Wind Farm | China | Yunnan | 23.4297°N 103.938°E | 300 | |
| Tuquan Huaneng Wind Farm | China | Inner Mongolia | 45.581°N 121.701°E | 300 | |
| Tongyu Shihuadao Wind Farm | China | Jilin | 42.9995°N 125.9816°E | 300 | |
| Linze Pingchuan Beitan Wind Farm | China | Gansu | 39.3392°N 100.1008°E | 300 | |
| Qahar Right Front Banner MengnengWind Farm | China | Inner Mongolia | 41.009°N 113.376°E | 300 | |
| Longnan Wudu Maying Wind Farm | China | Gansu | 33.579°N 104.8687°E | 300 | |
| Tongyu Xinhua Huaneng Wind Farm | China | Jilin | 44.5768°N 122.8154°E | 300 | |
| Shangyi Chensuoliang Wind Farm | China | Hebei | 41.3416°N 114.1212°E | 300 | |
| Shangyi Dongshan Wind Farm | China | Hebei | 41.3293°N 114.2746°E | 300 | |
| Kezuozhong Banner Haorigetu Wind Farm | China | Inner Mongolia | 44.2345°N 121.6922°E | 300 | |
| Fengning Hydrogen Wind Farm | China | Hebei | 41.264°N 116.6071°E | 300 | |
| Manzhouli Dalaihu Wind Farm | China | Inner Mongolia | 48.5246°N 123.6744°E | 300 | |
| Kangbao Hongmeng 3 Wind Farm | China | Hebei | 41.6374°N 114.5732°E | 300 | |
| Kangbao Hongmeng 1 Wind Farm | China | Hebei | 41.9301°N 114.7536°E | 300 | |
| Kangbao Hongmeng 4 Wind Farm | China | Hebei | 41.497°N 114.6082°E | 300 | |
| Sunitezuo Banner Bayanhangggai Fengding Wind Farm | China | Inner Mongolia | 43.9304°N 116.0415°E | 300 | |
| Weichang Qixin Wind Farm | China | Hebei | 42.226°N 117.0048°E | 300 | |
| Weichang Yuanbaoshan Wind Farm | China | Hebei | 41.9515°N 117.4066°E | 300 | |
| Kangbao Wohushi Wind Farm | China | Hebei | 41.9835°N 114.8226°E | 300 | |
| Alashanyou Banner Wind and Storage Wind Farm | China | Inner Mongolia | 39.7307°N 102.115°E | 300 | |
| Alashanzuo Banner Bayannuorigong Wind Farm | China | Inner Mongolia | 39.9656°N 104.8456°E | 300 | |
| Bayannur Wulanyiligeng Wind Farm | China | Inner Mongolia | 42°00′00″N 108°23′00″E | 300 | |
| Binyang Mawang Wind Farm | China | Guangxi | 24.0001°N 109.0001°E | 300 | |
| Chagannaoer Abag Banner Wind Farm | China | Inner Mongolia | 44.0186°N 114.9722°E | 300 | |
| Dongying Hekou Guohua Wind Farm | China | Shandong | 38.0975°N 118.3154°E | 300 | |
| Dongying Hekou Huaneng Wind Farm | China | Shandong | 38.0492°N 118.4642°E | 300 | |
| Ganzhou Pingshanhu Wind Farm | China | Gansu | 39.1707°N 100.835°E | 300 | |
| Hailar Thermal Power Wind Farm | China | Inner Mongolia | 48.6896°N 123.4438°E | 300 | |
| Haiyuan Xihuashan Wind Farm | China | Ningxia | 36.5964°N 105.3362°E | 300 | |
| Henan Huaneng Wind Farm | China | Qinghai | 36.581°N 99.662°E | 300 | |
| Huaxian Wind Farm | China | Henan | 34.0001°N 114.0001°E | 300 | |
| Jiuzhou Group Wind Farm | China | Heilongjiang | 46.7991°N 130.3216°E | 300 | |
| Kailu Beiqinghe Wind Farm | China | Inner Mongolia | 44.9970°N 120.6674°E | 300 | |
| Kailu Jianhua 1 Wind Farm | China | Inner Mongolia | 43.9521°N 121.3425°E | 300 | |
| Kailu Taipingzhao Wind Farm | China | Inner Mongolia | 43.7597°N 121.6789°E | 300 | |
| Kailu Yihetala Wind Farm | China | Inner Mongolia | 43.2443°N 114.3252°E | 300 | |
| Kangbao Wufutang Wind Farm | China | Hebei | 42.0721°N 114.6334°E | 300 | |
| Keshiketeng Banner Luotuotaizi Wind Farm | China | Inner Mongolia | 42.8167°N 117.8501°E | 300 | |
| Liaoning Fuxin Wind Farm | China | Liaoning | 42.3733°N 121.4192°E | 300 | |
| Longyuan Huitengliang Wind Farm | China | Inner Mongolia | 43°27′01″N 116°09′59″E | 300 | |
| Mulei Guotou Wind Farm | China | Xinjiang | 44.444°N 90.681°E | 300 | |
| Naiman Mingyang Wind Farm | China | Inner Mongolia | 42.8805°N 120.6885°E | 300 | |
| Shuocheng Limin Wind Farm | China | Shanxi | 39.336°N 112.1185°E | 300 | |
| Anhui Fuyang Nanbu Wind/Solar/Storage Complex Funan Wind Farm | China | Anhui | 32.6580°N 115.6150°E | 300 | |
| Subei Mazongshan Zhejiang Energy Wind Farm | China | Gansu | 41.531°N 97.094°E | 300 | |
| Sunitezuo Banner Bayanhanggai Mengneng Wind Farm | China | Inner Mongolia | 43.2612°N 112.6885°E | 300 | |
| Sunitezuo Banner Bayanhanggai Wind Farm | China | Inner Mongolia | 43.9609°N 113.9364°E | 300 | |
| Tacheng Laofengkou Wind Farm | China | Xinjiang | 46.1768°N 83.6142°E | 300 | |
| Taiyangshan Wind Farm | China | Ningxia | 37.4485°N 106.4028°E | 300 | |
| Tengxian Lubei Wind Farm | China | Guangxi | 23.0143°N 110.0131°E | 300 | |
| Tonghe Wind-Solar-Storage Wind Farm | China | Heilongjiang | 45.935°N 128.8794°E | 300 | |
| Tongliao Beiqinghe Wind Farm | China | Inner Mongolia | 43°56′30″N 121°09′00″E | 300 | |
| Tongliao Wind Farms | China | Inner Mongolia | 44.5024°N 121.4484°E | 1,000 | |
| Tongyu Wind Farm | China | Jilin | 44°48′46.8″N 123°5′18.3″E | 300 | |
| Weihuliang Wind Farm | China | Xinjiang | 42.4805°N 85.4633°E | 300 | |
| Zhalute Banner Bao'An Wind Farm | China | Inner Mongolia | 44.8422°N 120.5323°E | 300 | |
| Wulanhaote Huhe Horse Farm Wind Farm | China | Inner Mongolia | 46.1478°N 122.2656°E | 300 | |
| Wulatezhong Banner Wulanyiligeng Wind Farm | China | Inner Mongolia | 42.0257°N 108.3875°E | 300 | |
| Xilinhaote Huitengliang Longyuan Wind Farm | China | Inner Mongolia | 43.4503°N 116.1664°E | 300 | |
| Xilinhaote Huitengliang Wind Farm | China | Inner Mongolia | 43.5389°N 116.1756°E | 300 | |
| Xinlinhaote Baolige Wind Farm | China | Inner Mongolia | 44.5536°N 115.3344°E | 300 | |
| Zhalantun Huaneng Wind Farm | China | Inner Mongolia | 47.4953°N 122.3669°E | 300 | |
| Zhangbei Herun Wind Farm | China | Hebei | 41.1197°N 114.976°E | 300 | |
| Zhangbei Juren Wind Farm | China | Hebei | 41.1558°N 114.7303°E | 300 | |
| Zhangwu Zhangbei Wind Farm | China | Liaoning | 42.7631°N 122.5183°E | 300 | |
| Hubei Yingcheng Longhu Wind-Storage Integrated Wind Farm | China | Hubei | 31.0928°N 113.5866°E | 300 | |
| Henvey Inlet Wind Farm | Canada | Ontario | 45.8711°N 80.7111°W | 300 | |
| Kutch (Renew) II Wind Farm | India | Gujarat | 23.0949°N 69.6126°E | 300 | |
| Lac Alfred Wind Farm | Canada | Quebec | 48.3921°N 67.6795°W | 300 | |
| Thoothukudi Wind Farm | India | Tamil Nadu | 8.1648°N 77.6348°E | 300 | |
| Bhuj (Alfanar) Wind Farm | India | Gujarat | 23.0949°N 69.6126°E | 300 | |
| Kutch (Alfanar) Wind Farm | India | Gujarat | 23.0949°N 69.6126°E | 300 | |
| Kutch (Adani) VIII Wind Farm | India | Gujarat | 23.0949°N 69.6126°E | 300 | |
| Kutch (Sitac) Wind Farm | India | Gujarat | 23.0949°N 69.6126°E | 300 | |
| Kutch (Green Infra) I Wind Farm | India | Gujarat | 23.0949°N 69.6126°E | 300 | |
| Theni - Ambasamudram Wind Farm | India | Tamil Nadu | 9.8477°N 77.3829°E | 300 | |
| Banca Wind Farm | Romania | Western Moldavia | 45.9852°N 24.6859°E | 300 | |
| Lal Lal Wind Farm | Australia | Victoria | 37.6352°S 144.0237°E | 300 | |
| Gadag (Ayana) Wind Farm | India | Karnataka | 15.2955°N 76.3177°E | 300 | |
| Tiruppur-Karur (Sprng) Wind Farm | India | Tamil Nadu | 11.0547°N 77.3341°E | 300 | |
| Boujdour Wind Farm | Morocco | Boujdour | 24.1682°N 13.8921°W | 300 | |
| Sherbino Wind Farm | (United States) USA | Texas | 30°48′26″N 102°21′20″W | 300 | |
| Shiloh Wind Farm | (United States) USA | California | 38°7′N 121°50.5′W | 300 | |
| Stateline Wind Farm | (United States) USA | Oregon & Washington | 46°02′13.98″N 118°48′23.74″W | 300 | |
| Story County Wind Farm | (United States) USA | Iowa | 41°53′28″N 92°58′42″W | 300 | |
| Streator Cayuga Ridge South Wind Farm | (United States) USA | Illinois | 40°57′20″N 88°28′54″W | 300 | |
| Blackspring Ridge Wind Farm | Canada | Alberta | 50.2064°N 112.9140°W | 299 | |
| Bronco Plains Wind Farm | (United States) USA | Colorado | 39.0452°N 102.9401°W | 299 | |
| Sharp Hills Wind Farm | Canada | Alberta | 51.6616°N 110.6643°W | 297 | |
| Wulanchabu Hongji Wind Farm | China | Inner Mongolia | 41.2159°N 112.6982°E | 296.5 | |
| Punta Lomitas Wind Farm | Peru | Ica | 14.6517°S 75.9008°W | 296.4 | |
| Chayouzhong Banner Hongji Wind Farm | China | Inner Mongolia | 41.1924°N 112.6724°E | 296 | |
| União Dos Ventos Wind Farm | Brazil | Rio Grande do Norte | 5.0903°S 35.7980°W | 295.1 | |
| Pubei Longmen Wind Farm | China | Guangxi | 22.1092°N 109.3402°E | 294 | |
| Daqing Heping Aobao Wind Wind Farm | China | Daqing | 46.1950°N 124.2856°E | 288 | |
| Berrybank Wind Farm | Australia | Victoria | 37.9491°S 143.5302°E | 288 | |
| Björkhöjden Wind Farm | Sweden | Västernorrland | 63.4722°N 16.1034°E | 288 | |
| Storheia Wind Farm | Norway | Trøndelag | 63.8902°N 10.2019°E | 288 | |
| Åskälen Wind Farm | Sweden | Jämtland | 63.5542°N 15.0532°E | 288 | |
| Lagoa Do Barro Wind Farm | Brazil | Piauí | 8.6841°S 41.6237°W | 286.8 | |
| Lufeng Dahuangshan Wind Farm | China | Yunnan | 25.0446°N 101.5414°E | 286 | |
| Åndberg Wind Farm | Sweden | Jämtland | 61.7668°N 13.9410°E | 286 | |
| Pier Wind Farm | Mexico | Puebla | 18.8721°N 97.3957°W | 286 | |
| Noordoostpolder-Westermeerwind Windpark | Netherlands | Flevoland | 52.7698°N 4.4393°E | 285 | |
| Gulf Wind Farm | (United States) USA | Texas | 27°05′16.02″N 97°35′22.02″W | 283.2 | |
| King Mountain Wind Farm | (United States) USA | Texas | 31°14′16″N 102°14′16″W | 281.2 | |
| Lake Bonney Wind Farm | Australia | South Australia | 37°45′36″S 140°24′0″E | 279 | |
| Loeriesfontein Wind Farm | South Africa | Northern Cape | 30.3804°S 19.5893°E | 278 | |
| Zhengxiangbai Banner Fengsheng Wind Farm | China | Inner Mongolia | 42.291°N 115.0161°E | 277 | |
| Zaozhuang Shanting Wind Farm | China | Shandong | 35.0418°N 117.5744°E | 276 | |
| Bethel Wind Farm | (United States) USA | Texas | 34.5159°N 102.4215°W | 276 | |
| Dhar (SBESS) I Wind Farm | India | Madhya Pradesh | 22.5001°N 75.2501°E | 274 | |
| Malleco Wind Farm | Chile | Araucanía Region | 38.0325°S 72.2395°W | 273 | |
| Penonomé Wind Farm | Panama | Coclé | 8.4606°N 80.3584°W | 270.5 | |
| Alto Sertão 1 Wind Farm | Brazil | Bahia | 13.8823°S 42.6631°W | 270.4 | |
| Sapphire Wind Farm | Australia | New South Wales | 29.781°S 151.574°E | 270 | |
| K2 Wind Power Facility | Canada | Ontario | 43.8368°N 81.6767°W | 270 | |
| South Kent Wind Farm | Canada | Ontario | 42.2429°N 82.4248°W | 270 | |
| Mount Storm Wind Farm | (United States) USA | West Virginia | 39°13′28″N 79°12′15″W | 264 | |
| Sierra Juarez Wind Farm | Mexico | Baja California | 32.5590°N 116.0544°W | 263 | |
| Ras Ghareb Wind Farm | Egypt | Red Sea | 28.4005°N 32.9572°E | 263 | |
| Jerusalém-Boqueirão Wind Farm | Brazil | Rio Grande do Norte | 5.6105°S 36.1051°W | 260.4 | |
| Jiangyong Shuimeitang Wind Farm | China | Hunan | 25.2699°N 111.3433°E | 260 | |
| Campillo De Altobuey Wind Farm | Spain | Castilla la Mancha | 39.6113°N 1.7928°W | 259.2 | |
| Ventominho Wind Farm | Portugal | Viana do Castelo | 42.0183°N 8.2439°W | 259 | |
| Dechang Labashan Wind Farm | China | Sichuan | 27.1935°N 102.0829°E | 258 | |
| Qinnan Wind Farm | China | Guangxi | 22.0542°N 108.7288°E | 258 | |
| Geribatu Wind Farm | Brazil | Rio Grande do Sul | 33.5431°S 53.2769°W | 258 | |
| Ventos De São Fernando Wind Farm | Brazil | Rio Grande do Norte | 5.1529°S 36.0422°W | 256.5 | |
| Roan Wind Farm | Norway | Trøndelag | 64.1839°N 10.3294°E | 256 | |
| Sopi-Tootsi Wind Farm | Estonia | Northern Pärnu | 58.6347°N 25.1230°E | 255 | |
| Chakla (Suzlon) I Wind Farm | India | Maharashtra | 21.3198°N 74.3094°E | 255 | |
| Fântânele – Cogealac Wind Farm | Romania | Constanța | 44.6091°N 28.5670°E | 252 | |
| Maniyachi Wind Farm | India | Tamil Nadu | 10.3261°N 77.9851°E | 252 | |
| West Bakr Wind Farm | Egypt | Red Sea | 28.1338°N 33.2602°E | 252 | |
| Karaburun Wind Farm | Turkey | İzmir | 38.6428°N 26.4434°E | 252 | |
| El Mezquite Wind Farm | Mexico | Nuevo León | 26.2212°N 100.5420°W | 252 | |
| Tuticorin (Engie) Wind Farm | India | Tamil Nadu | 8.8053°N 78.1453°E | 252 | |
| Gulf of Suez Wind Project | Egypt | Red Sea | 28.3553°N 33.0622°E | 252 | |
| Ventika Wind Farm | Mexico | Nuevo Leon | 25.9058°N 98.7909°W | 252 | |
| Quảng Bình B&T Province Wind Farm | Vietnam | Quảng Bình Province | 17.2541°N 106.4938°E | 252 | |
| Cedar Point Wind Farm | (United States) USA | Colorado | 39°25′18″N 103°40′41″W | 252 | |
| Pjelax Wind Farm | Finland | Ostrobothnia | 62.4052°N 21.4842°E | 251.6 | |
| Jingbian Longzhou Wind Farm | China | Shaanxi | 37.5068°N 108.9173°E | 251 | |
| Xiangshui Huanghai Wind Farm | China | Jiangsu | 34.3342°N 119.9333°E | 251 | |
| Sidhpur Wind Farm | India | Gujarat | 23.9310°N 72.3628°E | 251 | |
| Devbhumi Dwarka SECI-8 (CLP) Wind Farm | India | Gujarat | 22.2244°N 69.6734°E | 251 | |
| Eurus Wind Farm | Mexico | Oaxaca | 16°32′25″N 94°57′14″W | 250.5 | |
| Palo Alto Wind Farm | (United States) USA | Iowa | 43.0475°N 94.9229°E | 250 | |
| Smoky Hills Wind Farm | (United States) USA | Kansas | 38°58′20″N 98°09′01″W | 250 | |
| Triple H Wind Farm | (United States) USA | South Dakota | 44.4010°N 99.6038°W | 250 | |
| Kutch (Green Infra) II Wind Farm | India | Gujarat | 23.0949°N 69.6126°E | 250 | |
| Kutch (Renew) I Wind Farm | India | Gujarat | 23.1312°N 68.9296°E | 250 | |
| Kutch (Renew) V Wind Farm | India | Gujarat | 23.0949°N 69.6126°E | 250 | |
| Chandragiri Wind Farm | India | Tamil Nadu | 8.8053°N 78.1453°E | 250 | |
| Tamil Nadu (Evergreen) Wind Farm | India | Tamil Nadu | 10.6802°N 78.4023°E | 250 | |
| Tuticorin (Green Infra) Wind Farm | India | Tamil Nadu | 8.7846°N 78.1314°E | 250 | |
| Altai (State Power Investment) Wind Farm | China | Xinjiang | 47.4459°N 85.8767°E | 250 | |
| Yanchi Wind Farm | China | Ningxia | 37.7718°N 107.5132°E | 250 | |
| Lingwu Ningdong Wind Farm | China | Ningxia | 37.3096°N 105.9609°E | 250 | |
| Fuyang Nanbu Yingshang Wind Farm | China | Anhui | 32.6619°N 116.1113°E | 250 | |
| Shanyin Pianling Wind Farm | China | Shanxi | 39.714°N 112.7806°E | 250 | |
| Youyu Niuxinbao Wind Farm | China | Shanxi | 40.1007°N 112.501°E | 250 | |
| Shanyin Zhinüquan Wind Farm | China | Shanxi | 39.8117°N 112.6667°E | 250 | |
| Haiyang Pileishan Wind Farm | China | Shandong | 36.9417°N 121.1333°E | 250 | |
| Chayouhou Banner Bayinxile Wind Farm | China | Inner Mongolia | 41.161°N 112.7433°E | 250 | |
| Guyuan Huadian Wind Farm | China | Hebei | 41.5329°N 115.6786°E | 250 | |
| Qingdao Baoshan Wind Farm | China | Shandong | 35.9999°N 119.8960°E | 250 | |
| Qingyuan Baihuayan Wind Farm | China | Zhejiang | 27.6227°N 119.072°E | 250 | |
| Weichang Yudaokou Wind Farm | China | Hebei | 42.3321°N 117.0282°E | 250 | |
| Altai Jimunai Wind Farm | China | Xinjiang | 42.4805°N 85.4633°E | 250 | |
| Chaoyang Smart Wind Farm | China | Liaoning | 41.3833°N 120.1798°E | 250 | |
| Chayouqian Banner Meiguiying Wind Farm | China | Inner Mongolia | 41.1331°N 113.5076°E | 250 | |
| Daqing Economic Development Wind Farm | China | Heilongjiang | 46.6524°N 124.8706°E | 250 | |
| Jidian Weifang Wind Farm | China | Shandong | 36.88°N 118.73°E | 250 | |
| Kangbao Hongmeng 2 Wind Farm | China | Hebei | 41.8472°N 114.5923°E | 250 | |
| Karamay Wind Farm | China | Xinjiang | 45.479°N 84.761°E | 250 | |
| Qaidam Xitieshan Wind Farm | China | Qinghai | 37.1911°N 95.4137°E | 250 | |
| Qinnan Fengmenling Wind Farm | China | Guangxi | 21.9448°N 108.6577°E | 250 | |
| Rongcheng Guohua Wind Farm | China | Shandong | 37.1333°N 121.9417°E | 250 | |
| Shangyi Dasuji Wind Farm | China | Hebei | 41.4547°N 114.1158°E | 250 | |
| Tanghe Jiulong Wind Farm | China | Henan | 32.4877°N 112.7534°E | 250 | |
| Tianlin Lucheng Wind Farm | China | Guangxi | 24.4244°N 106.0884°E | 250 | |
| Tianzhu Songshantan Wind Farm | China | Gansu | 36.9847°N 103.1453°E | 250 | |
| Tongyu Xinglongshan Wind Farm | China | Jilin | 44.6766°N 122.3624°E | 250 | |
| Wafangdian Zhaotun Wind Farm | China | Liaoning | 39.8953°N 122.0081°E | 250 | |
| Weichang Hongsong Wind Farm | China | Hebei | 42.5751°N 117.6026°E | 250 | |
| Wengniute Banner Wind Farm | China | Inner Mongolia | 42.8122°N 118.1775°E | 250 | |
| Zhucheng Guohua Wind Farm | China | Shandong | 35.8711°N 119.5411°E | 250 | |
| Wulatezhong Banner Chuanjing Wind Farm | China | Inner Mongolia | 41.9501°N 108.3833°E | 250 | |
| Xiaxian Sijiaozhen Wind Farm | China | Shanxi | 35.1152°N 111.3593°E | 250 | |
| Yilan Jiguanshan Wind Farm | China | Heilongjiang | 46.2377°N 129.751°E | 250 | |
| Zhalantun Wind Farm | China | Inner Mongolia | 47.7483°N 122.8307°E | 250 | |
| Zhangbei Wudengshan Wind Farm | China | Hebei | 41.378°N 114.3101°E | 250 | |
| Zhangwu Xiliujiazi Wind Farm | China | Liaoning | 42.2336°N 122.5803°E | 250 | |

== Large proposed wind farms ==
Wind farm locations

The following table lists some of the largest proposed onshore wind farms, by nameplate capacity.

| Wind farm | Country | State/province | Coordinates | Capacity (MW) | References |
|---|---|---|---|---|---|
| Asian Renewable Energy Hub | Australia | Western Australia | 20.16°S 121.32°E | 7,500 | |
| Walcha Energy Project | Australia | New South Wales | | 3,400 | |
| Corona Wind Projects | (United States) USA | New Mexico | 34°15′2″N 105°35′44″W | 2,200 | |
| Chokecherry and Sierra Madre Wind | (United States) USA | Wyoming | | 1,500 | |
| Forest Wind | Australia | Queensland | 25.776°S 152.795°E | 1,200 | |
| ACWA Wind Farm | Egypt | Gabal El Zeit | | 1,100 | |
| Castle Hill Wind Farm | New Zealand | North Island | | 860 | |
| Golden Plains Wind Farm | Australia | Victoria | | 800 | |
| Horizonte Wind | Chile | Antofagasta | | 778 | |
| Monsoon Wind | Laos | Sekong | | 600 | |
| Haymaker Hybrid | (United States) USA | Montana | | 600 | |
| Rosepetal Wind | India | Rajasthan | | 585 | |
| Loa Wind Farm | Chile | Antofagasta | | 528 | |
| Aviator Wind | (United States) USA | Texas | | 525 | |
| Maverick Creek Wind | (United States) USA | Texas | | 524 | |
| Sagamore Wind | (United States) USA | New Mexico | | 522 | |
| Zarasfhan Wind | Uzbekistan | Navoi | | 500 | |
| Goyder South | Australia | South Australia | | 412 | |
| Vėjas LT | Lithuania | Kelmė District Municipality | | 300 | |
| Pagėgiai Wind Farm | Lithuania | Pagėgiai Municipality | | 248 | |
| Sopi-Tootsi wind farm | Estonia | Pärnu County | | 225 | |

== Maps of all the coordinates in this article ==
Note that the Google map allows the display of the coordinates listed in the individual sections of the article to be turned on and off (use the expand(+) / contract(-) icons and the checkboxes to control which sections, or individual coordinate flags, are displayed).

== See also ==
- List of energy storage power plants
- List of offshore wind farms
- Wind power by country
