= Solar power in Washington (state) =

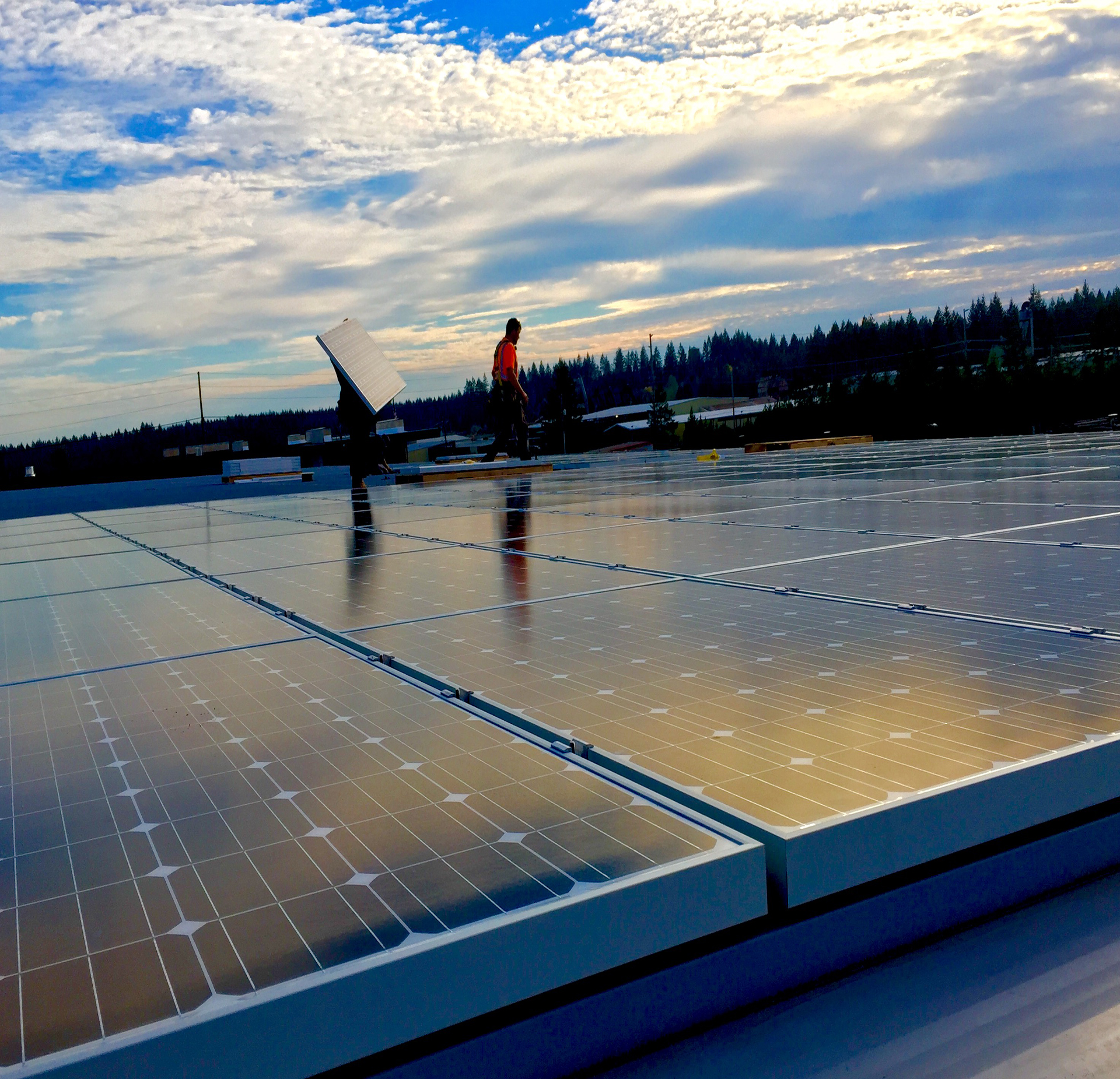
Solar installation, Shelton

As of the first quarter of 2023, Washington State has 604 MW of solar power electricity generation. This is an increase from about 300 MW in 2021 and 27 MW in 2013.

Washington pays a feed-in tariff of up to $5,000/year of 15 cents/kWh, which is increased by a factor of 2.4 if the panels are made in the state and by an additional 1.2 if the inverters are made in state.

== Amount of sunlight ==
The average insolation in Washington's two largest cities are as follows.

In the charts, a peak sun hour is one kilowatt-hour per square meter of solar irradiance.

Source: NREL	Source: NREL

== Installed generation capacity ==
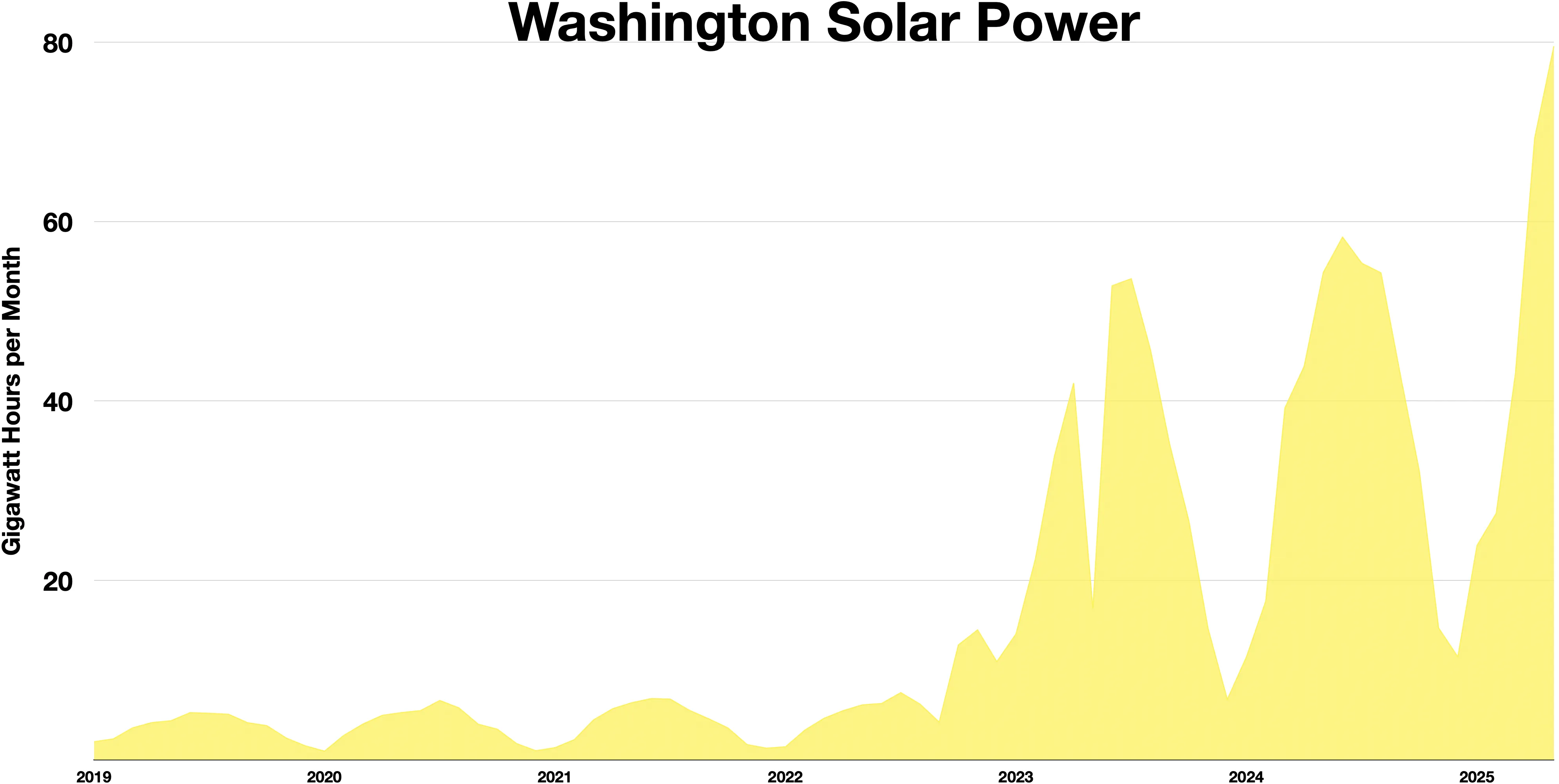
Washington solar power

=== Total grid connected ===
Grid-connected PV capacity (MW)
Year	Capacity	Change	% change
2007	1.9		
2008	3.7	1.8	95%
2009	5.2	1.5	41%
2010	8.0	2.9	54%
2011	12.3	4.2	54%
2012	19.5	7.2	59%
2013	27.4	7.9	41%
2014	39	7.2	42%
2015	62	26	59%
2016	85	23	37%
2017	105	20	23%
2018	169	64	61%
2019	216	47	27%
2020	250.3	34.3	15%
2021	297.6	47.3	%
2022	585	287.4	%

=== Utility-scale ===
Utility-scale solar generation in Washington (GWh)
Year	Total	Jan	Feb	Mar	Apr	May	Jun	Jul	Aug	Sep	Oct	Nov	Dec	% of generation	% of generation for utility and small-scale solar combined
2018	2	0	0	0	0	0	0	0	0	0	0	1	1	0.001%	0.13%
2019	43	2	2	4	4	4	5	5	5	4	4	2	2	0.041%	0.23%
2020	47	1	3	4	5	5	5	7	6	4	4	2	1	0.040%	0.25%
2021	50	1	2	5	6	6	7	7	6	5	4	2	1	0.045%	0.32%
2022	83	1	3	5	5	6	6	7	6	4	13	14	11	0.07%	0.41%
2023	363	15	23	34	42	16	52	52	45	35	27	16	8	0.35%	0.86%
2024	437	11	18	40	44	55	59	56	55	44	33	14	10	0.43%	1.05%
2025	629	24	27	43	69	80	86	89	75	60	41	20	14	0.61%	1.31%
2026		16	24												

==== Small-scale ====
Small-scale solar generation in Washington (GWh)
Year	Total	Jan	Feb	Mar	Apr	May	Jun	Jul	Aug	Sep	Oct	Nov	Dec	% of generation
2018	150	5	8	11	15	17	17	20	19	17	11	6	5	0.13%
2019	205	7	11	15	21	23	24	27	26	22	15	7	7	0.19%
2020	250	8	15	19	25	28	29	33	31	27	18	9	8	0.22%
2021	308	10	17	23	31	35	36	41	39	34	22	11	10	0.28%
2022	393	12	21	29	39	44	46	52	50	44	29	15	13	0.34%
2023	518	17	28	38	52	58	60	69	66	57	38	19	17	0.50%
2024	634	21	37	48	65	72	74	84	79	68	44	22	20	0.62%
2025	722	24	41	55	74	82	84	95	90	78	51	25	23	0.70%
2026		28	47											

== See also ==
- List of power stations in Washington#Solar
- Wind power in Washington (state)
- Solar power in the United States
- Renewable energy in the United States
