= Wind power in Washington =

Electricity from wind in one U.S. state

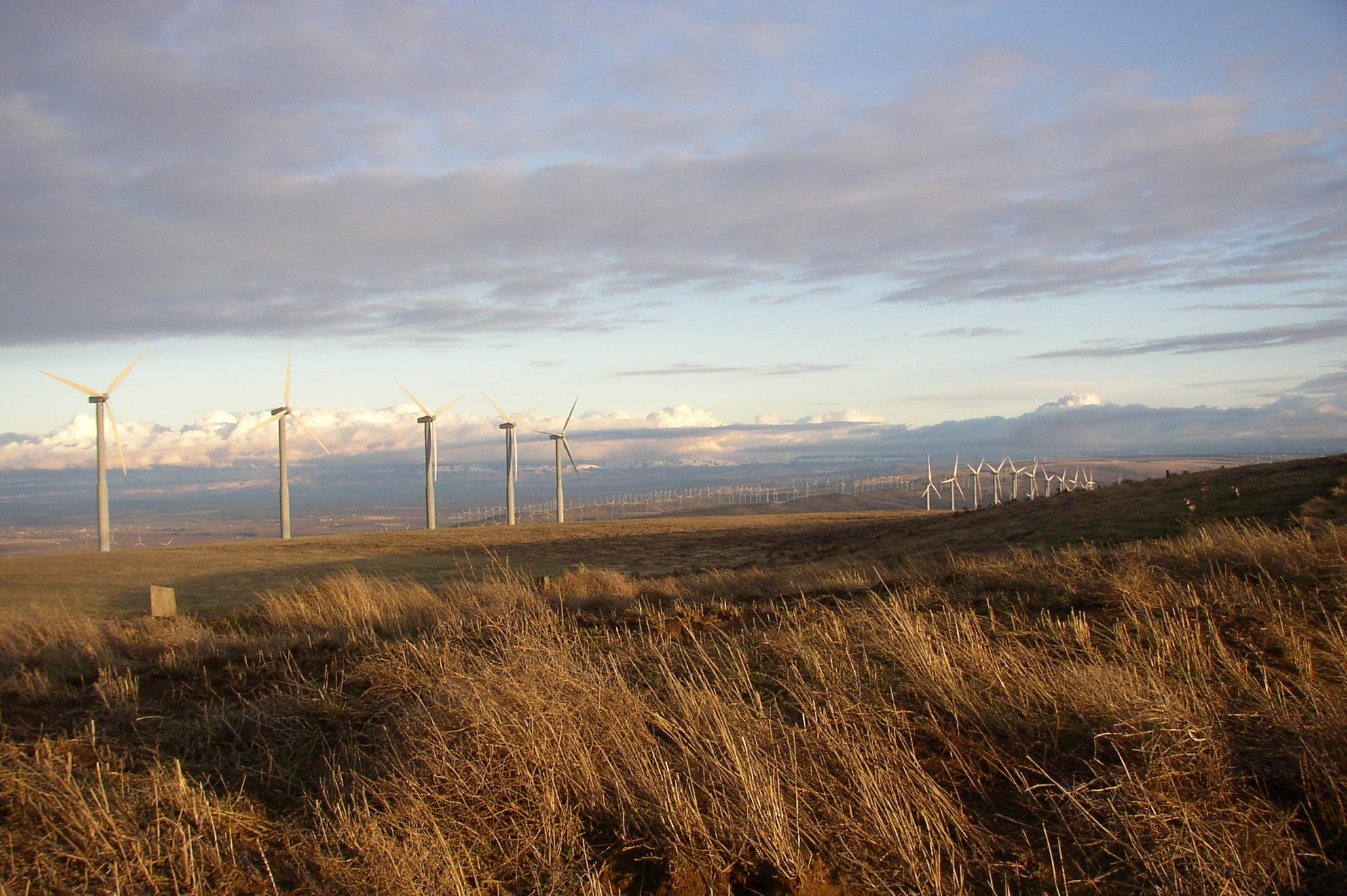
Wind turbines above Walla Walla River in Washington

At the end of 2015, the installed capacity of wind power in Washington was 3,075 megawatts (MW) with wind power accounting for 7,101 GWh. In 2016, it reached a generation of 8,041 GWh, comprising 7.1% of the electricity generated in the state. In 2023, it had a capacity of 3,407 MW (with another 600MW under construction), responsible for 7.75% of generation.

== State legislative support ==
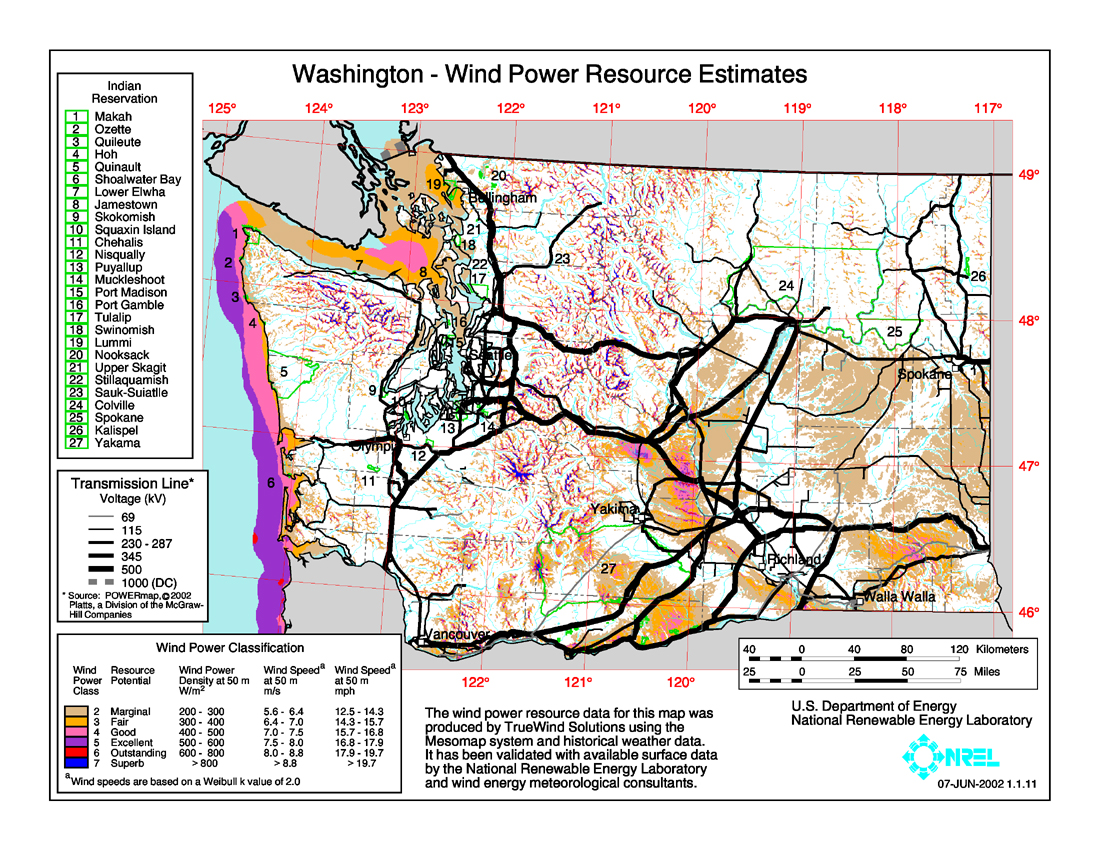
Wind resource map at 50 m above ground

Initiative 937 required electric utilities with 25,000 or more customers to have 15 percent of their power supply generated from new renewable resources – excluding existing hydropower – by 2020. Washington has sales tax exemptions for wind energy. Washington provides utility grants, loans and rebates for wind power.

== Notable projects ==
Wind farm northeast of Walla Walla

Name	Location	Capacity (MW)	Ref
Windy Point Wind Farm	Klickitat County	400	
Wild Horse Wind Farm	Kittitas County	273	
Marengo Wind Farm	Columbia County	211	
White Creek Wind Farm	Klickitat County	205	
Big Horn Wind Farm	Klickitat County	200	
Stateline Wind Farm	Walla Walla County	177	
Hopkins Ridge Wind Farm	Columbia County	157	
Lower Snake River Wind Project	Garfield County	344.7	
Tucannon River Wind Farm	Columbia County	267	
Palouse Wind Farm	Whitman County	100	
Nine Canyon Wind Project	Benton County	95.9	

== Potential capacity ==
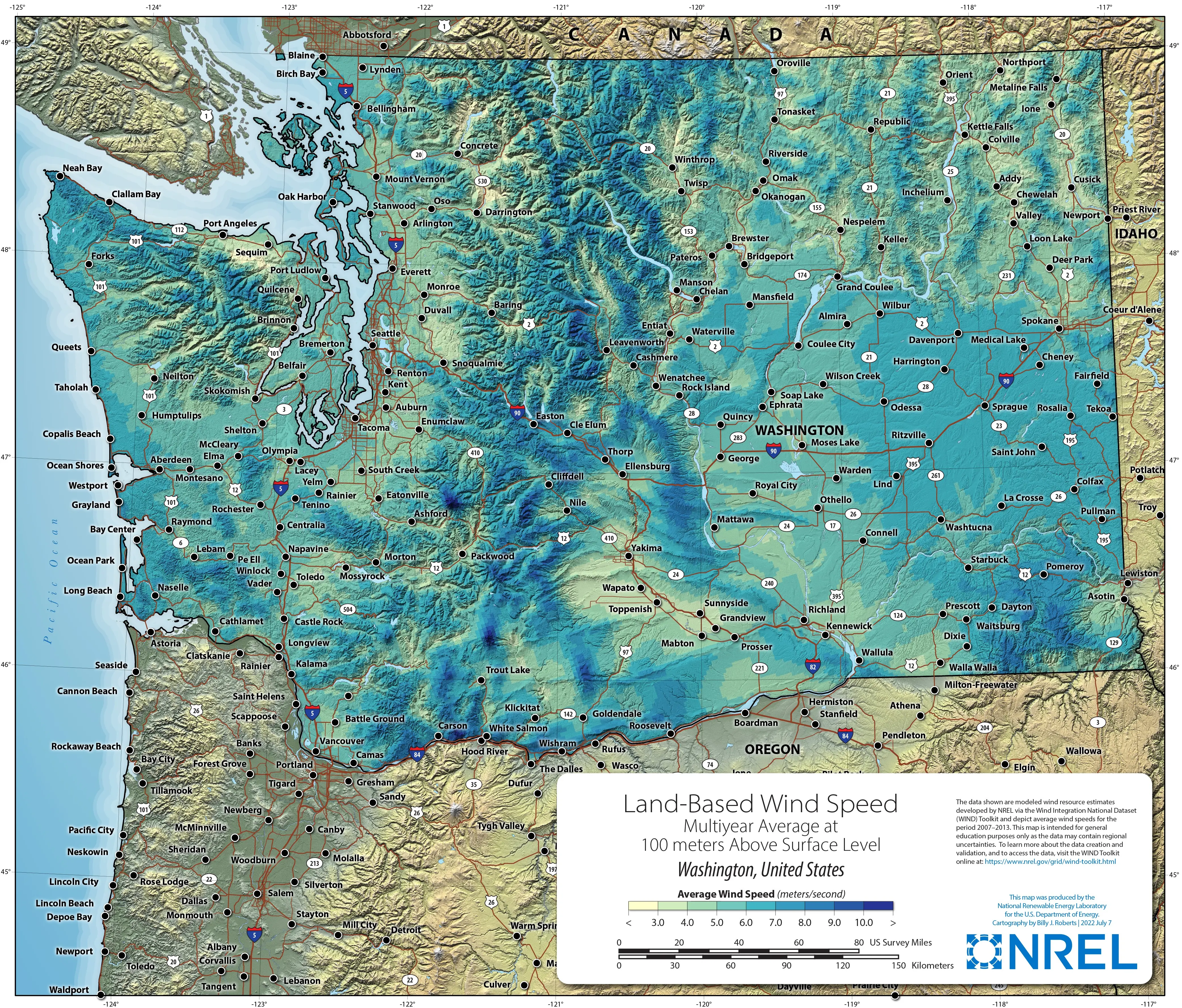
Washington onshore wind potential map

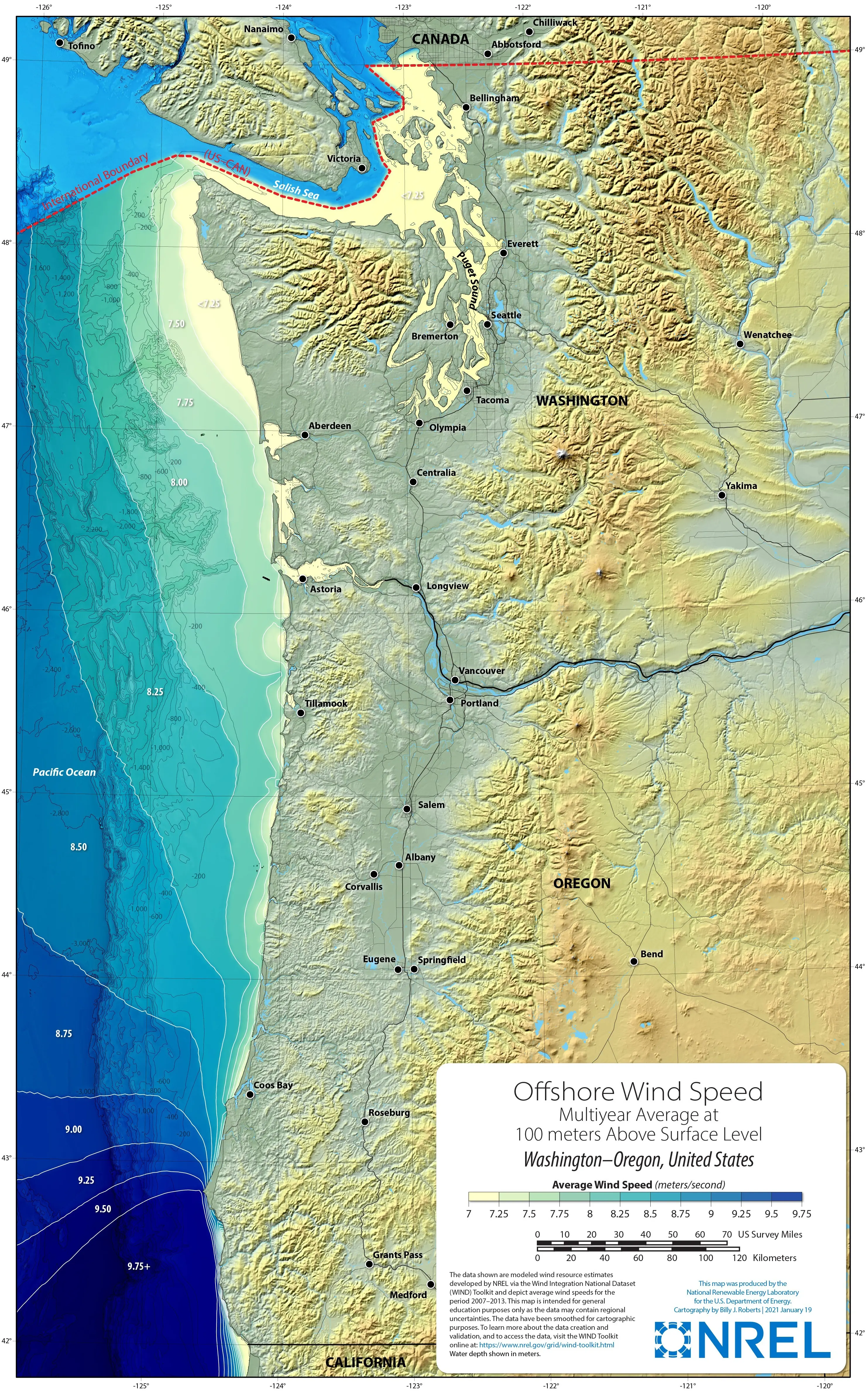
Washington-Oregon offshore wind potential map

The National Renewable Energy Laboratory estimates that Washington has the potential to install over 18,000 megawatts of onshore wind power. Washington ranks 24th in its potential for onshore wind generation, and also has the potential to install 120,964 MW of offshore wind generation, which could generate 488,025 GWh/year.

=== Installed ===
Installed wind power capacity in Washington has seen strong growth in recent years and Washington now ranks among the top ten states with the most wind power installed. Wind power accounted for 5.3% of total electricity generated in Washington during 2011.

The table below shows the growth in wind power installed nameplate capacity in MW for Washington from 1999 to 2011.

== Statistics ==
Washington's wind power generating capacity has been steadily increasing since 2005.

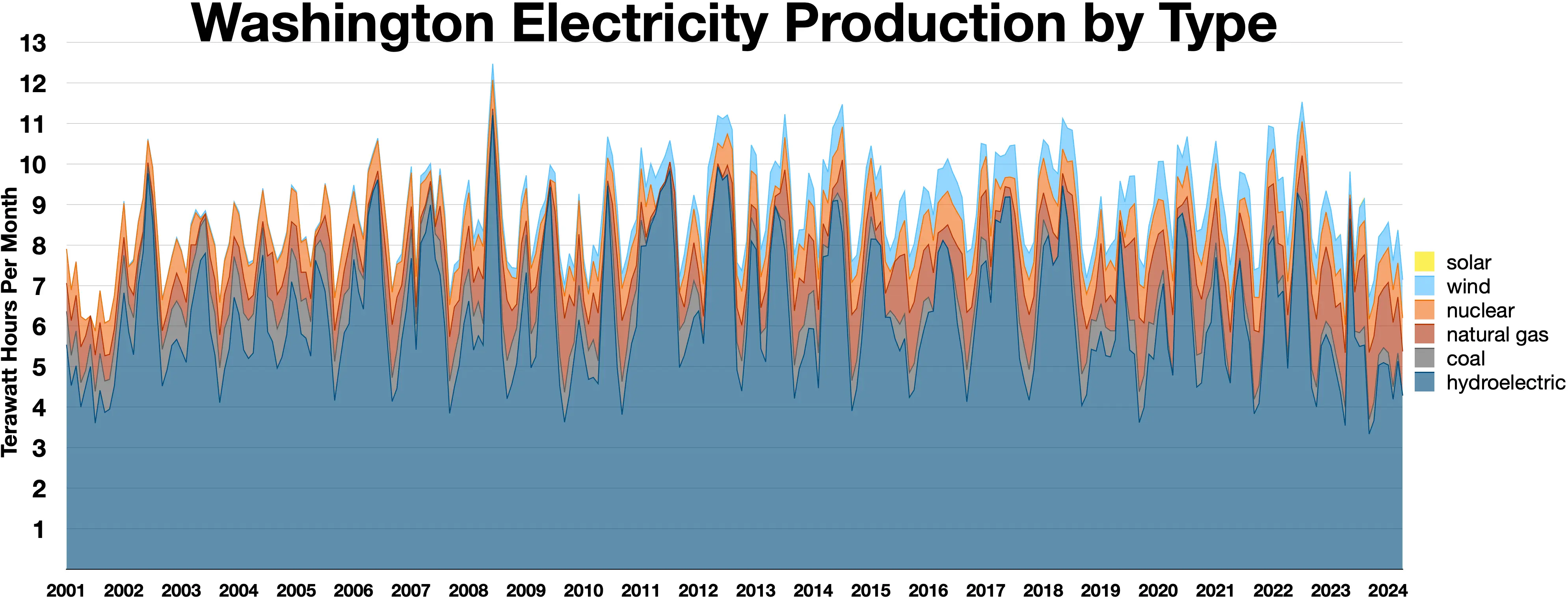
Washington electricity production by type

Wind power in Washington
Year	Capacity (MW)	Generation (GWh)	Capacity factor (%)	Generation (% of total)
2000	0			
2001	180.2			
2002	228.3	418	21.9	
2003	243.9	602	28.2	
2004	240.6	737	35	
2005	390	498	15.6	
2006	818.1	1,038	14.5	
2007	1,163.2	2,439	23.9	
2008	1,375	3,658	30.4	
2009	1,848.9	3,571	22	
2010	2,104.4	4,475	24.3	4.6%
2011	2,573	6,261	27.8	5.3%
2012	2,808	6,600	26.8	5.8%
2013	2,808	7,003	24.5	6.2%
2014	3,075	7,269	26	6.3%
2015	3,075	7,077	26.3	6.5%
2016	3,075	8,043	29.9	7.1%
2017	3,075	6,925	25.7	5.97%
2018	3,075	7,899	29.3	6.77%
2019	3,085	6,679	24.7	7.33%
2020	3,395	9,266	28	7.98%
2021		9,298		8.39%
2022		8,061		6.91%
2023		7,601		7.33%
2024		8863		8.66%
2025		8570		8.31%
2026				

Washington wind generation (GWh, million kWh)
Year	Total	Jan	Feb	Mar	Apr	May	Jun	Jul	Aug	Sep	Oct	Nov	Dec
2002	418	48	21	51	35	28	33	36	31	34	26	33	42
2003	602	28	35	71	76	42	74	61	55	33	42	52	33
2004	737	70	59	85	62	72	48	39	47	57	65	58	75
2005	498	30	23	56	42	48	63	34	38	40	44	49	31
2006	1,038	151	81	85	77	73	59	81	53	49	63	184	82
2007	2,439	151	155	211	197	183	211	156	200	201	206	196	372
2008	3,658	314	297	361	375	330	397	307	297	170	238	253	319
2009	3,571	316	144	435	322	330	356	239	345	282	307	334	161
2010	4,475	221	130	401	619	522	519	422	471	361	348	402	329
2011	6,261	519	484	513	745	557	637	529	572	367	497	499	342
2012	6,600	531	511	777	607	682	724	469	484	316	516	345	638
2013	7,003	502	672	649	890	610	537	568	456	587	350	505	677
2014	7,269	448	540	754	770	723	783	552	491	517	480	679	532
2015	7,077	304	492	573	681	524	567	772	717	554	578	608	707
2016	8,043	438	631	819	699	797	780	735	575	684	606	606	673
2017	6,925	282	441	650	806	567	772	827	611	528	664	498	279
2018	7,899	447	863	708	793	751	836	756	819	559	394	516	457
2019	6,679	315	385	366	764	720	884	819	688	641	519	325	253
2020	9,265	931	972	915	800	784	745	725	627	501	876	775	614
2021	9,298	553	1,028	798	911	803	703	584	709	673	738	920	887
2022	8,061	521	792	849	902	941	675	484	579	555	648	590	525
2023	7,601	631	873	846	780	568	509	478	539	544	547	668	613
2024	8863	543	673	709	1004	1110	838	694	659	683	688	713	559
2025	8570	723	695	1017	830	753	699	542	472	408	750	737	945
2026		726	640										

== See also ==
- Solar power in Washington (state)
- Wind power in the United States
- Renewable energy in the United States
