= Panther Creek Wind Farm =

Wind farm in Big Spring, Texas, United States

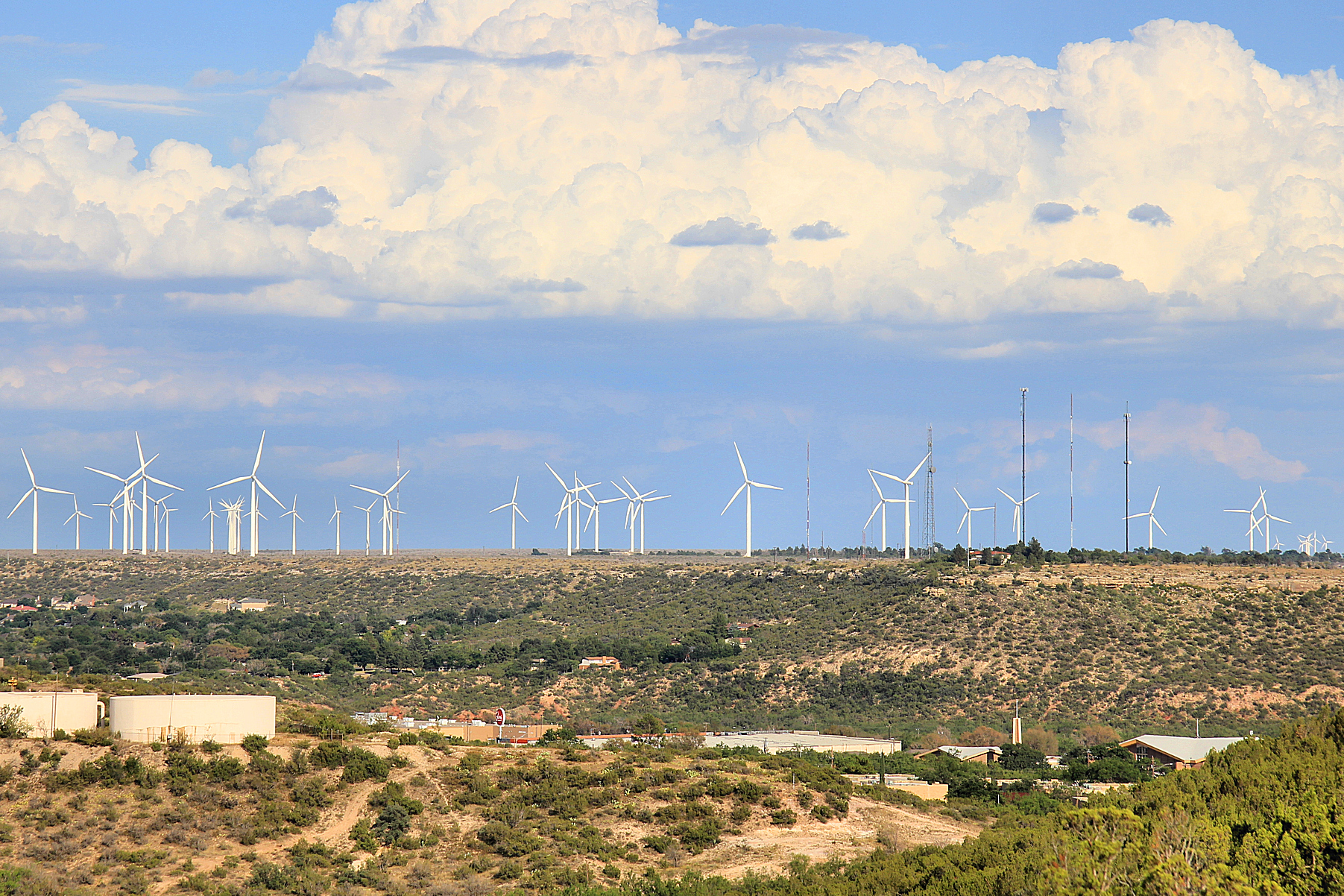
- Part of the Panther Creek Wind Farm in Howard County as seen from Big Spring State Park
- Country: United States
- Location: Big Spring, Texas
- Coordinates: 31°59′N 101°07′W

Power generation
- Units operational: 305
- Nameplate capacity: 457.5 MW

The Panther Creek Wind Farm in Big Spring, Texas, United States consists of 305 wind turbines and has an installed capacity of 457.5 megawatts, making it one of the ten largest wind farms in the United States. Phases I and II of the wind farm became operational early in 2009, with the completion of the third and final phase in September 2009. The projects are located in Howard, Sterling and Glasscock Counties. The wind farm can now generate enough wind power to supply 135,000 Texan homes.

== See also ==
- Wind power in the United States
- List of onshore wind farms
