= Windy Point/Windy Flats Wind Farm =

Wind farm in Washington, USA

Windy Point/Windy Flats
- Country: United States
- Location: Goldendale, Washington
- Coordinates: 45°44′31″N 120°43′32″W
- Status: Operational
- Owners: Tuolumne Wind Project Authority (Phase I); CRG Partners - a Cannon Power Group affiliate (Phase II and III)

Power generation
- Nameplate capacity: 398.8 MW
- Capacity factor: 29.4% (average 2010-2017)
- Annual net output: 1,028 GW·h

The Windy Point/Windy Flats project, located in Goldendale, Washington, is the largest wind farm in Washington State. The 90 square miles (230 km^{2}) wind farm spans 26 miles (42 km) along the Columbia River ridgeline and has a capacity of 500 megawatts (MW).

Construction of 400 of the 500 MW was completed by the end of 2009. Cannon Power Group, the project developer, constructed the 400 MW in two phases within 18 months—Phase I (137 MW) and Phase II (262 MW).

== Location ==
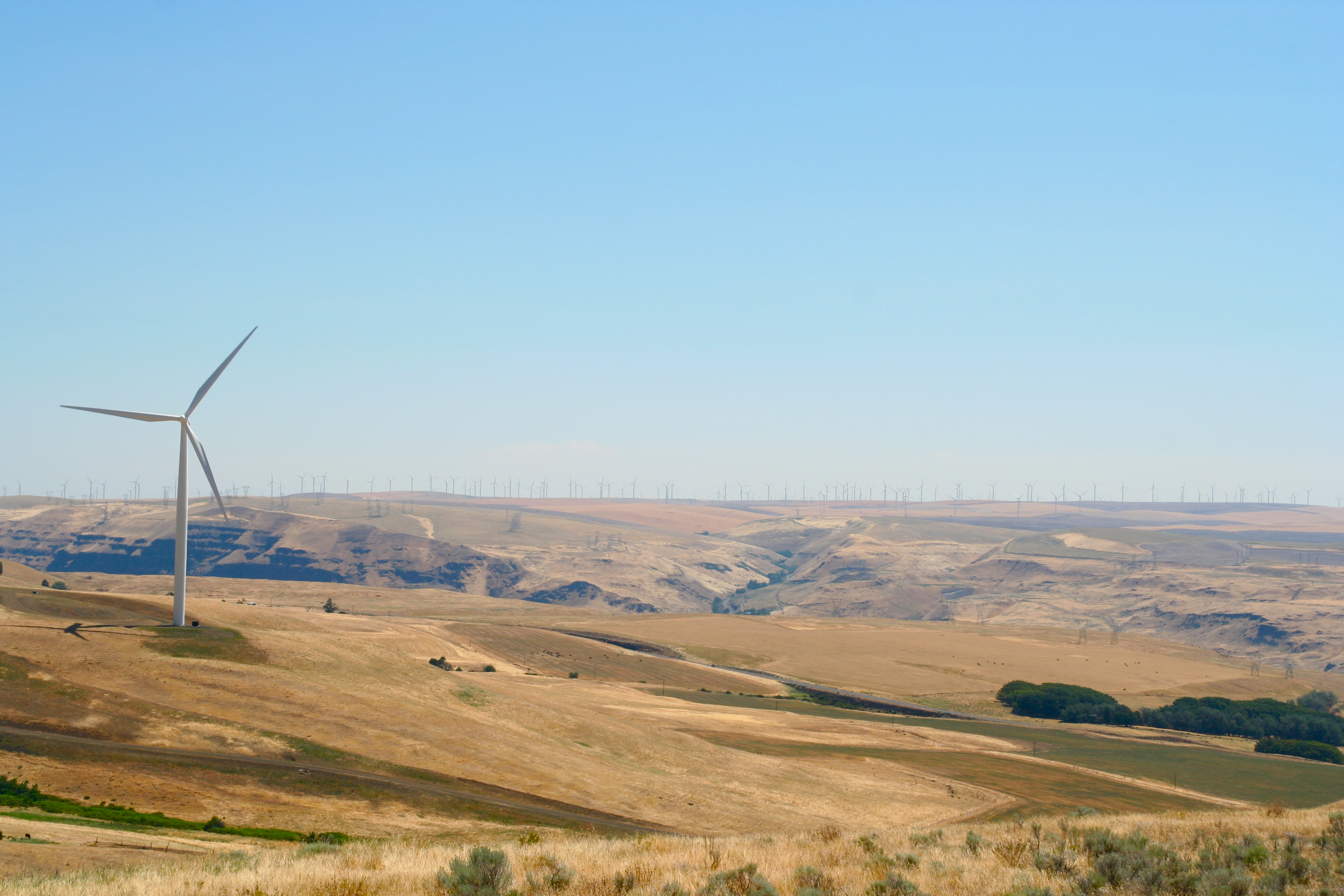
A partial view of the Windy Points/Windy Flats project. Hundreds of windmills can be seen in the background.

The Windy Point/Windy Flats project is located in Goldendale, Washington, along the Columbia River some 100 miles (160 km) east of Portland, Oregon, 70 miles (100 km) south of Yakima, Washington, and 100 miles (160 km) west of the Tri-Cities. The terrain is generally rolling with an elevation of 1,620 feet (494 m) at the airport.

== Partners ==
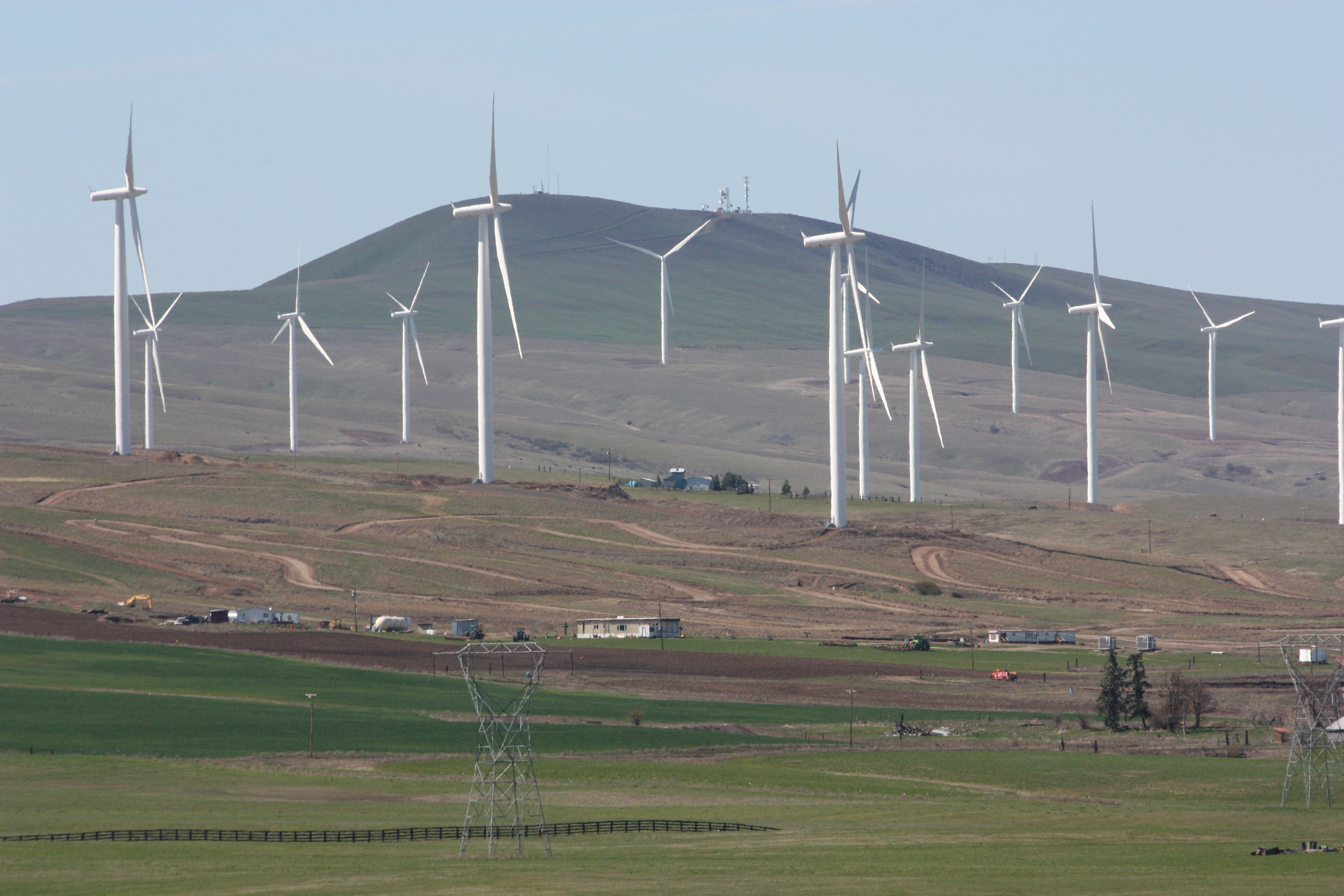
U.S. Route 97 in Washington passes through a portion of the Windy Flats project near the Columbia River south of Goldendale.

The Maryhill Museum of Art has entered into an agreement with Cannon Power Group to site 15 wind turbines on the eastern end of the museum's 5,300 acres (21 km^{2}) in SW Washington State. According to the American Wind Energy Association, this is believed to be the first wind energy project in the United States to generate revenues for a nonprofit museum. The relationship is now positioned to generate more than $100,000 in revenue for the museum each year.

== See also ==
- List of power stations in Washington
- Wind power in Washington (state)
- List of wind farms in the United States
