= White Creek Wind Farm =

Wind farm in Washington, United States

Coordinates: 45°43′36″N 120°50′02″W

The White Creek Wind Farm is an electricity generating wind farm facility in Klickitat County, Washington, United States. It is owned by Last Mile Electric Cooperative and began operations in 2007. The facility has a generating capacity of 205 megawatts.

== See also ==
- List of wind farms in the United States
- List of power stations in the United States
- Wind power in Washington
