= Marengo Wind Farm =

Wind farm in Washington, United States

Coordinates: 46°22′27″N 117°46′36″W

Marengo Wind Farm is an electricity generating wind farm facility located near Dayton, Washington, United States. It is owned by PacifiCorp and began operations in 2007. The facility has a generating capacity of 140 megawatts.

== See also ==
- List of wind farms in the United States
- Wind power in Washington
