= Lower Snake River Wind Project =

Wind farm in Washington state, USA

Coordinates: 46°28′N 117°44′W

The Lower Snake River Wind Project is the newest and largest wind farm operated by Puget Sound Energy, and is located in Washington’s Garfield and Columbia counties. The wind farm is made up of 149 Siemens wind turbines rated at 2.3 MW each for a maximum generating capacity of 343 MW. The project was estimated to create up to 150 temporary jobs and 25 permanent jobs.

== See also ==
- Wind power in Washington
- List of wind farms in the United States
