= Big Horn Wind Farm =

Wind farm in Klickitat County, Washington

Coordinates: 45°45′22″N 120°48′31″W

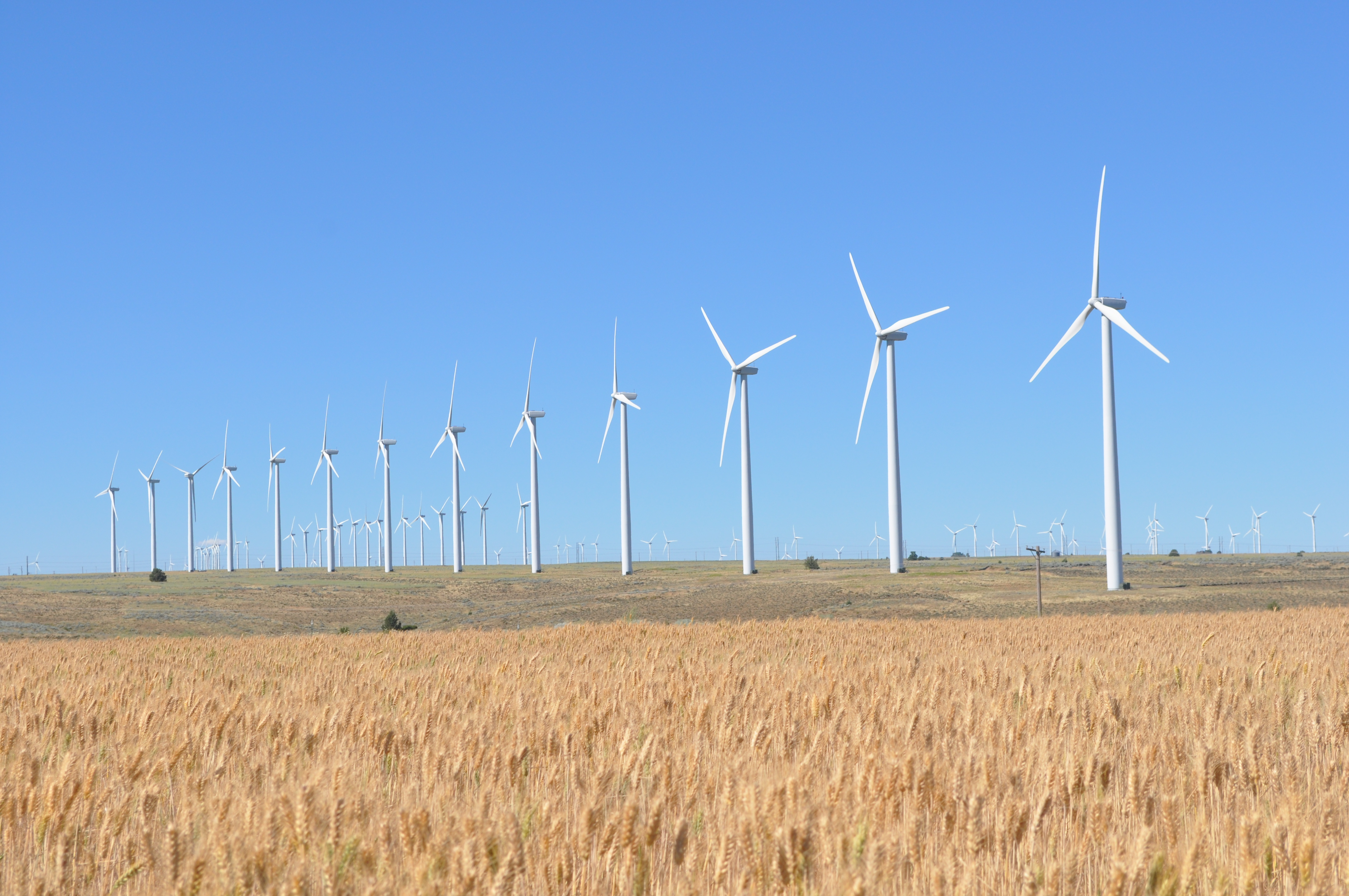
Big Horn Wind Farm turbine row (2013)

The Big Horn Wind Farm is a 200 megawatt wind farm in Klickitat County, Washington. It uses 133 GE Energy 1.5 MW wind turbines. The wind farm is owned by Big Horn LLC, a subsidiary of Iberdrola Renewables. 98 percent of the land it is on remains available for traditional uses, such as hunting and farming.
