= Hopkins Ridge Wind Farm =

Wind farm in Washington, United States

Coordinates: 46°24′07″N 117°48′44″W

The Hopkins Ridge Wind Farm is an electricity generating wind farm facility located in Columbia County, Washington, United States. It is owned by Puget Sound Energy and began operations in 2005, built by RES Americas, a part of the Renewable Energy Systems Group. After a second phase of construction in 2008, the facility has a generating capacity of 157 megawatts, up from 149 megawatts. In the past, the energy output of Hopkins Ridge and Wild Horse Wind Farm (another facility owned by Puget Sound Energy) has been sold to various California utilities through power purchase agreements.

== See also ==
- List of wind farms in the United States
- Wind power in Washington
