= List of wind farms in the United States =

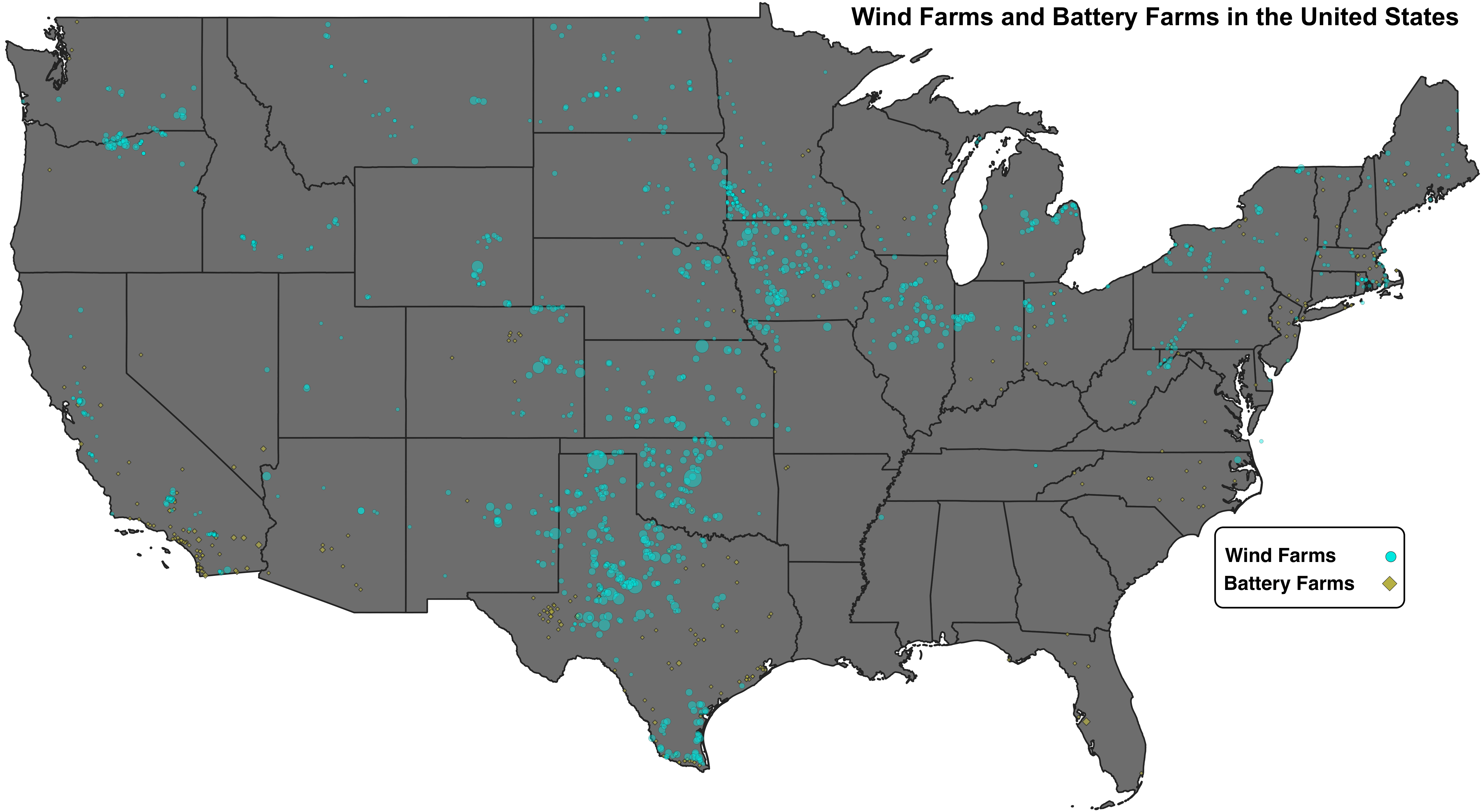
Wind farms and battery farms in the United States

North Dakota and Wyoming lead per capita generation of electricity from wind.

This is a list of large wind farms in the United States. Many of the wind farms in the United States are located in the Great Plains.

== Onshore wind farms ==
Listed are wind farms with a generating capacity of at least 150 megawatts (MW) or any of the three largest farms in its state with a generating capacity of at least 120 MW.

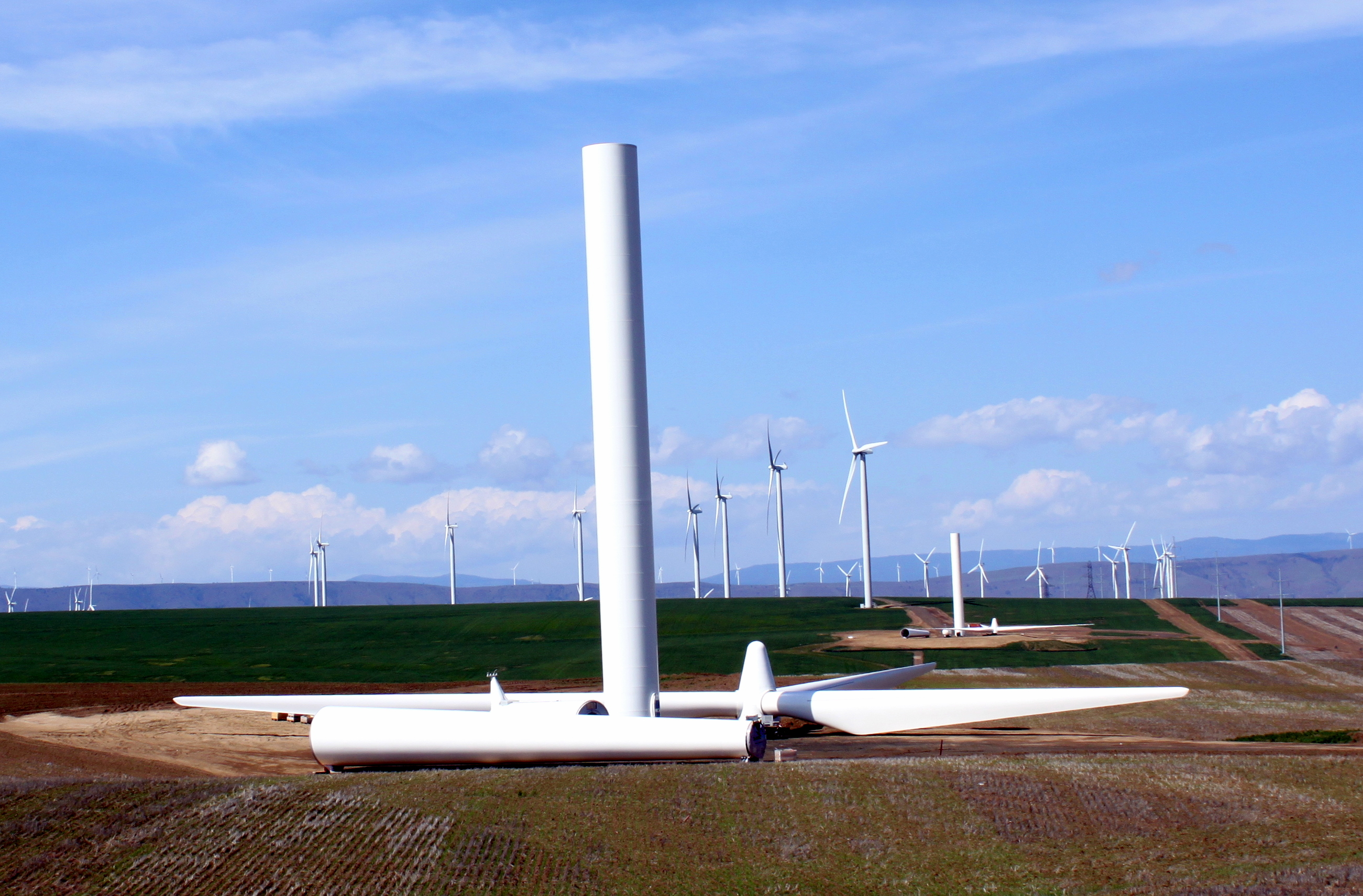
Part of the Biglow Canyon Wind Farm, with a turbine under construction

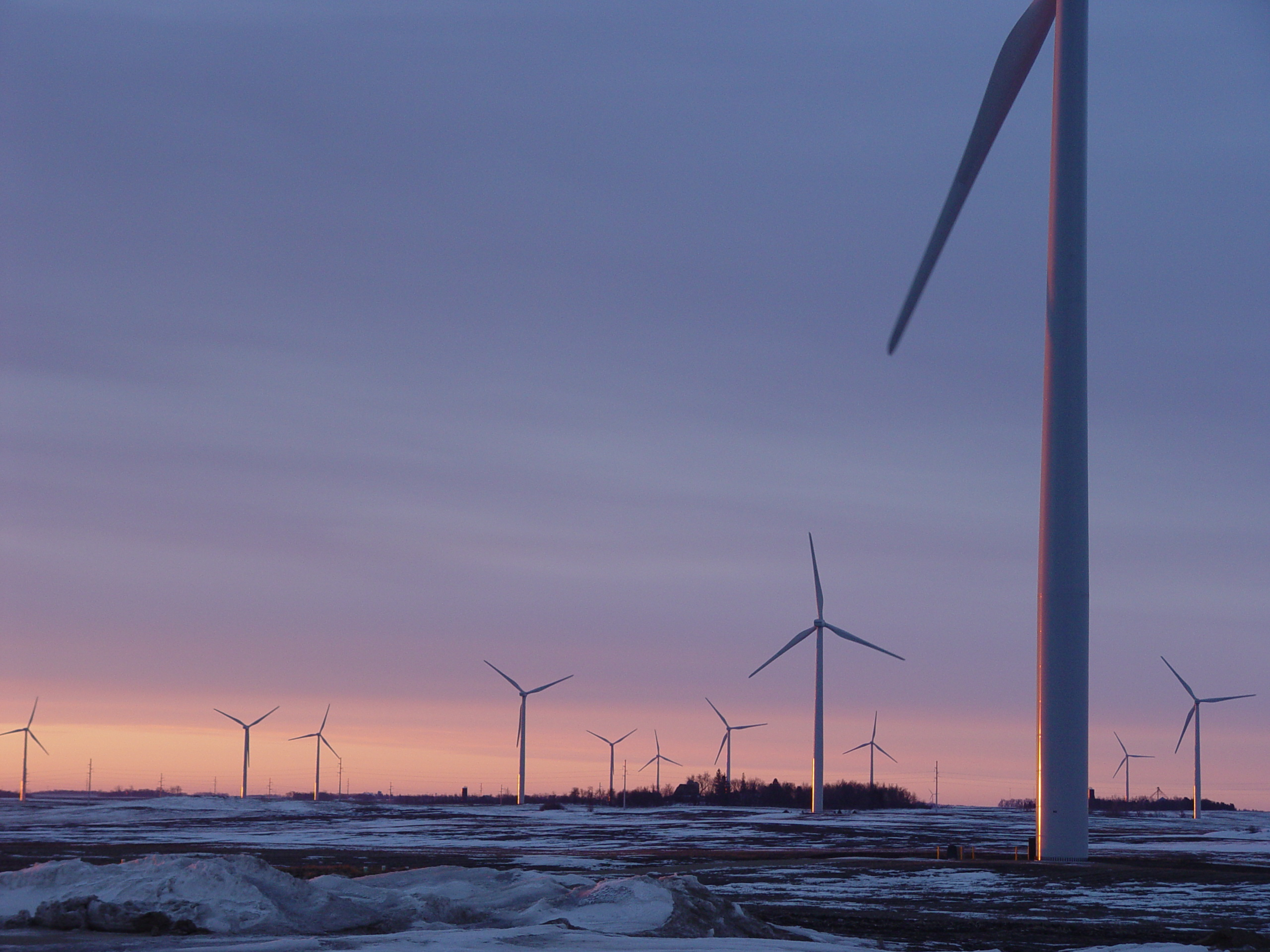
Fenton Wind Farm at sunrise

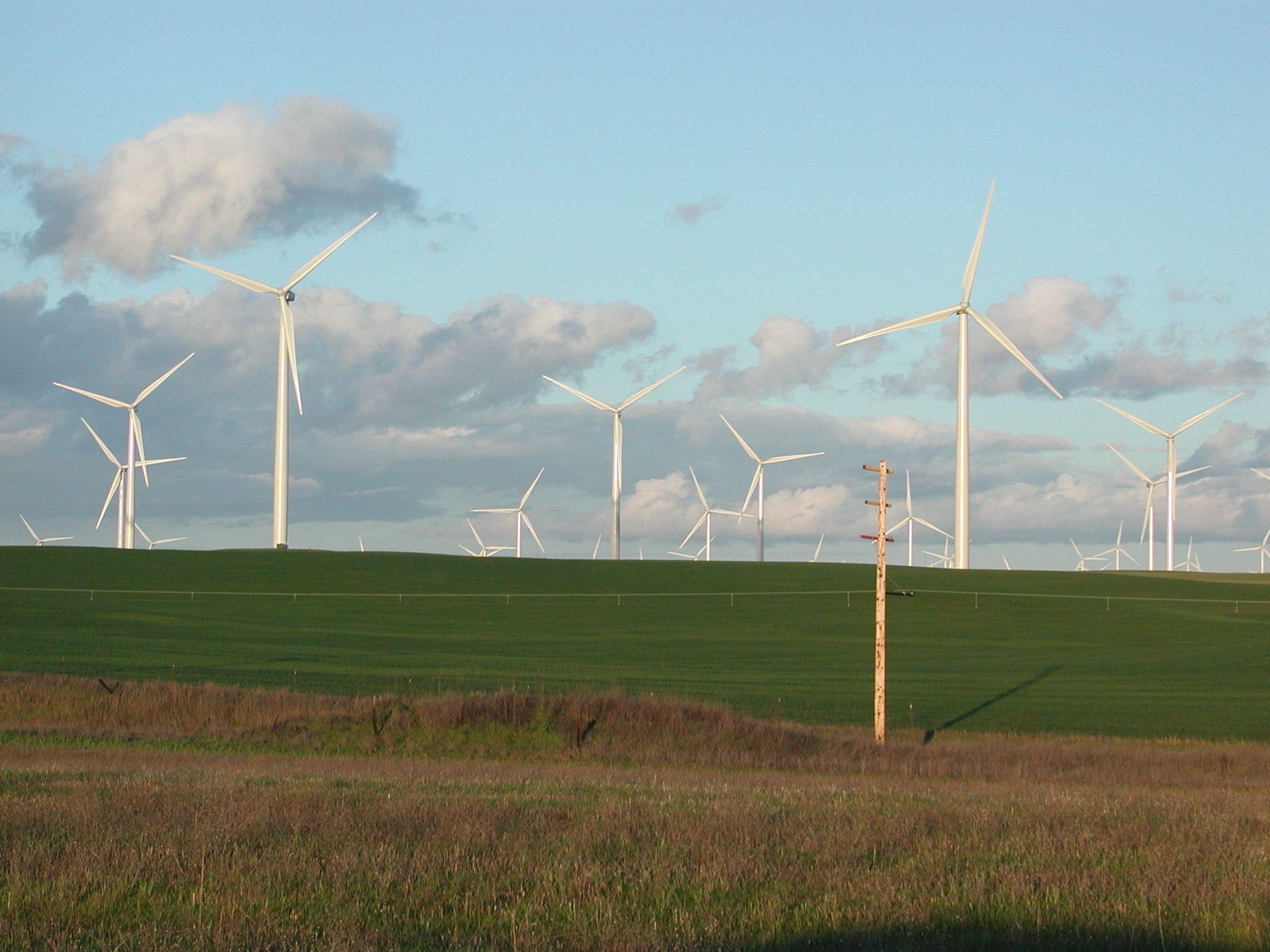
Shiloh Wind Power Plant. The surrounding land is used for sheep grazing and growing hay.

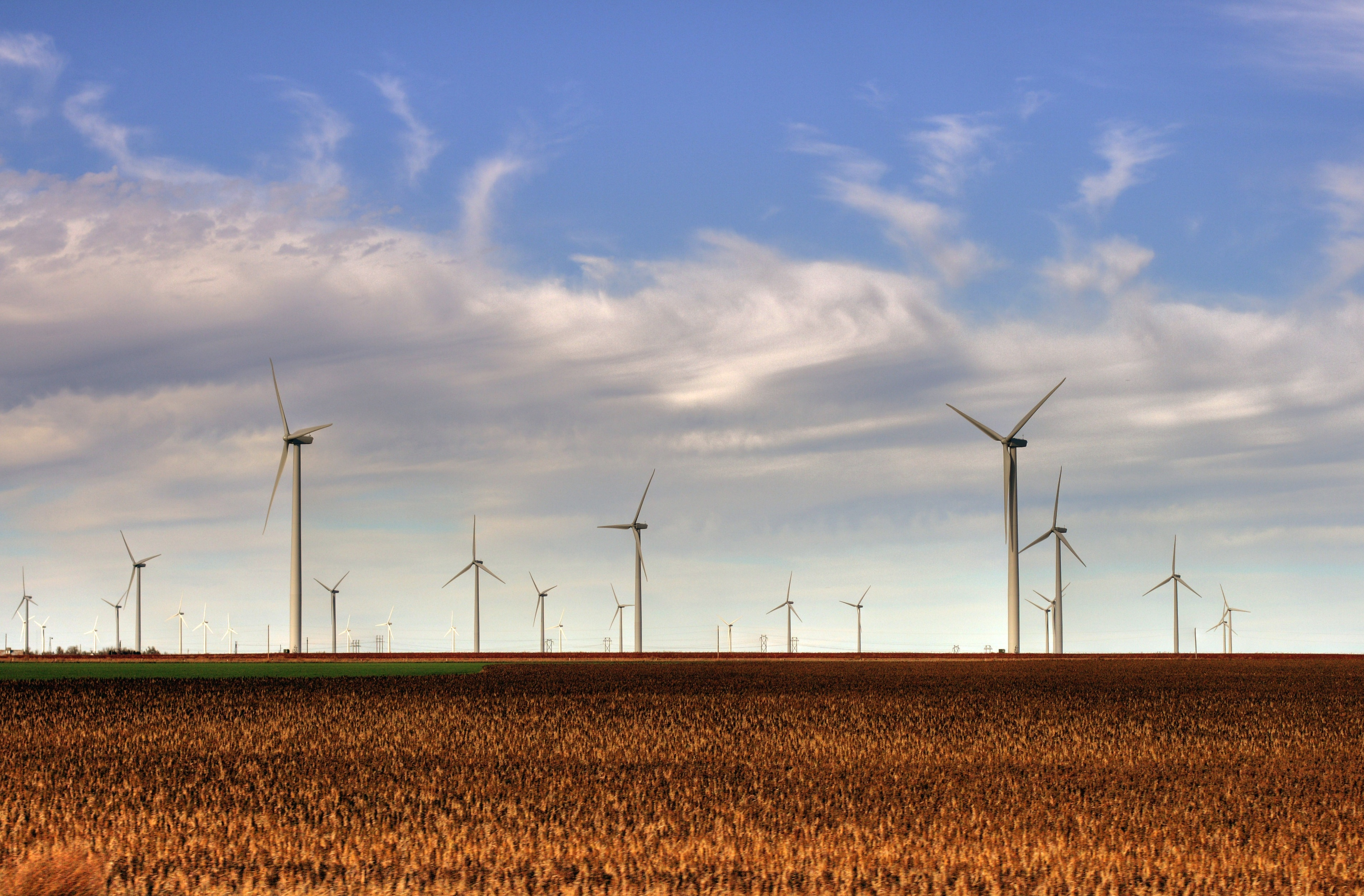
The Smoky Hills Wind Farm in Kansas

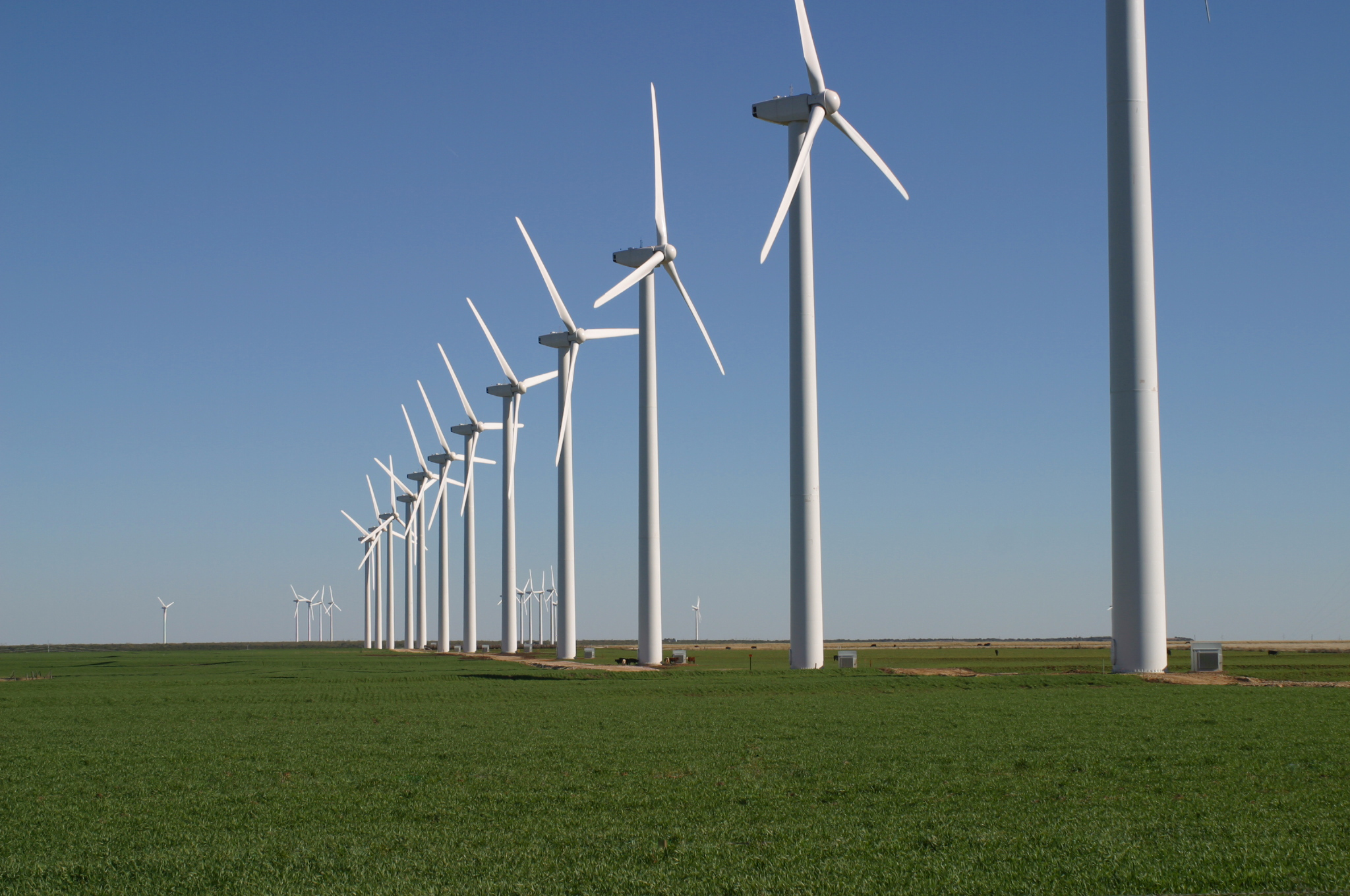
Brazos Wind Ranch in Texas

Farm	State	Coordinates	Installed capacity (MW)	Ref
Adair Wind Farm	Iowa	41°28′N 94°38′W	174	
Alta Wind Energy Center I-XI	California	35°1′N 118°19′W	1548	
Altamont Pass Wind Farm	California	37°44′N 121°39′W	576	
Amazon Wind Farm	Texas	32°44′N 100°44′W	253	
Arbor Hill Wind Farm	Iowa	41°21′N 94°29′W	250	
Armadillo Flats Wind Farm	Oklahoma	36°22′N 97°49′W	247	
Ashtabula Wind Farm	North Dakota	46°39′N 98°0′W	196	
Balko Wind	Oklahoma	36°31′N 100°54′W	300	
Bearkat Wind Farm	Texas	31°44′N 101°35′W	197	
Beaver Creek Wind Farm I & II	Iowa	42°02′N 94°02′W	340	
Bent Tree Wind Farm	Minnesota	43°47′N 93°25′W	201	
Bethel Wind Farm	Texas	34°34′N 102°28′W	276	
Big Horn Wind Farm	Washington	45°45′N 120°48′W	200	
Big Sky Wind Farm	Illinois	41°34′N 89°26′W	240	
Biglow Canyon Wind Farm	Oregon	45°38′N 120°36′W	450	
Bingham Wind Farm	Maine	45°06′N 69°46′W	184	
Bishop Hill 1	Illinois	41°13′N 90°7′W	200	
Bison Wind Energy Center	North Dakota	46°59′N 101°33′W	497	
Blackstone Wind Farm II	Illinois	40°56′N 88°38′W	200	
Blue Canyon Wind Farm	Oklahoma	34°51′N 98°34′W	423	
Blue Creek Wind Farm	Ohio	41°00′N 84°35′W	302	
Blue Sky Green Field Wind Farm	Wisconsin	43°51′N 88°15′W	145	
Bluestem Wind Farm	Oklahoma	36°33′N 100°35′W	198	
Brady Wind Energy Center (I & II)	North Dakota	46°00′N 102°39′W	299	
Breunnings Breeze	Texas	26°28′N 97°50′W	228	
Broadview Energy Wind	New Mexico	34°34′N 103°16′W	324	
Buena Vista (Storm Lake)	Iowa	42°44′N 95°18′W	193	
Buckeye Wind Energy Center	Kansas	39°03′N 97°10′W	206	
Buffalo Gap Wind Farm	Texas	32°19′N 100°9′W	523	
Buffalo Ridge Wind Farm	Minnesota	44°22′N 96°21′W	225	
Buffalo Ridge II	South Dakota	44°39′N 96°38′W	210	
Bull Creek Wind Farm	Texas	32°56′N 101°35′W	180	
Canadian Hills Wind Farm	Oklahoma	35°41′N 98°09′W	299	
Caney River Wind Project	Kansas	37°17′N 96°27′W	201	
Capital Bloom Wind Farm	Kansas	37°29′N 99°55′W	178	
Capricorn Ridge Wind Farm	Texas	31°54′N 100°54′W	662	
California Ridge Wind Farm	Illinois	40°11′N 87°53′W	217	
Camp Springs Energy Center	Texas	32°44′N 100°48′W	250	
Cedar Bluff Wind Farm	Kansas	38°29′N 99°59′W	199	
Cedar Creek Wind Farm	Colorado	40°52′N 104°6′W	550	
Cedar Point Wind Farm	Colorado	39°25′N 103°41′W	252	
Century Wind Farm	Iowa	42°30′N 93°38′W	200	
Chapman Ranch Wind Farm	Texas	27°37′N 97°32′W	236	
Cheyenne Ridge Wind Farm	Colorado	38°59′N 102°20′W	498	
Chisholm View Wind I & II	Oklahoma	36°34′N 97°46′W	300	
Cimarron Bend Wind Farm	Kansas	37°21′N 99°59′W	400	
Clear Creek Energy Center	Missouri	40.43421°N 94.89084°W	242	
Clines Corner Wind Farm	New Mexico	34°21′N 105°26′W	325	
Colbeck's Corner Wind Farm	Texas	35°15′N 101°11′W	200	
Courtenay Wind farm	North Dakota	47°11′N 98°36′W	200	
Crescent Wind	Michigan	42°01′N 84°31′W	166	
Crossroads Wind Farm	Oklahoma	36°02′N 98°30′W	227	
Crow Lake Wind Farm	South Dakota	43°46′N 99°00′W	162	
Crystal Lake Wind Farm	Iowa	43°14′N 93°50′W	416	
Deerfield Wind Farm	Michigan	43°57′N 82°54′W	149	
Desert Wind Farm	North Carolina	36°19′N 76°25′W	208	
Diamond Vista Wind Farm	Kansas	38°49′N 97°36′W	299	
Dry Lake Wind Farm I & II	Arizona	34°38′N 110°13′W	128	
Dutch Hill/Cohocton Wind Farm	New York	42°33′N 77°29′W	125	
Eclipse Wind Project	Iowa	41°41′N 94°45′W	200	
El Cabo Wind Farm	New Mexico	34°36′N 106°02′W	298	
Electra Wind Farm	Texas	34°09′N 99°30′W	230	
Elm Creek (I & II)	Minnesota	43°44′N 94°46′W	249	
Fenton Wind Farm	Minnesota	43°53′N 95°54′W	206	
Flat Ridge Wind Farm	Kansas	37°13′N 98°15′W	570	
Flat Top Wind	Texas	31°41′N 98°31′W	200	
Forward Wind Energy Center	Wisconsin	43°37′N 88°29′W	138	
Fowler Ridge Wind Farm	Indiana	40°36′N 87°19′W	600	
Frontier Wind Farm	Oklahoma	36°48′N 97°15′W	200	
Glacier Hills Wind Farm	Wisconsin	43°35′N 89°07′W	162	
Glacier Wind Farm	Montana	48°33′N 111°55′W	210	
Golden West Wind Farm	Colorado	38°56′N 104°13′W	249	
Goodwell Wind Farm	Oklahoma	36°50′N 101°26′W	200	
Goshen Wind Farm II	Idaho	43°16′N 112°02′W	125	
Gratiot County Wind Project (DTE)	Michigan	43°23′N 84°27′W	213	
Grandview	Texas	35°21′N 101°23′W	211	
Grande Prairie Wind Farm	Nebraska	42°36′N 98°26′W	400	
Grand Ridge Wind Farm	Illinois	41°00′N 88°24′W	210	
Great Prairie Wind Farm	Texas		1,027	
Great Western Wind Farm	Oklahoma	36°10′N 99°36′W	225	
Green Pastures Wind Farm	Texas	33°38′N 99°25′W	300	
Gulf Wind Farm	Texas	27°05′N 97°35′W	283	
Haystack Wind Farm	Nebraska		298	
Headwaters Wind Farm	Indiana	40°04′N 85°01′W	200	
Helena Energy Center	Texas		268	
Hereford 1	Texas	34°49′N 102°25′W	200	
High Prairie Renewable Energy Center	Missouri	40°25′N 92°31′W	400	
Highland Wind Energy Center	Iowa	43°05′N 95°34′W	502	
Hidalgo Wind Farm	Texas	26°28′N 98°25′W	250	
HillTopper Wind Farm	Illinois	39°57′N 89°18′W	185	
Horse Creek Wind Farm	Texas	33°10′N 99°45′W	230	
Horse Hollow Wind Energy Center	Texas	32°11′N 100°02′W	736	
Ida Grove Wind Farm	Iowa	42°16′N 95°28′W	301	
Javelina Wind Energy Center	Texas	27°49′N 99°27′W	749	
Judith Gap Wind Farm	Montana	46°34′N 109°45′W	135	
Jumbo Road Wind Farm	Texas	34°49′N 102°24′W	300	
Kay Wind Farm	Oklahoma	36°59′N 97°08′W	300	
Kelly Creek Wind Farm	Illinois	40°58′N 88°12′W	184	
Kingfisher Wind Farm	Oklahoma	35°40′N 97°52′W	298	
Kingman Wind Energy (I & II)	Kansas	37°33′N 98°10′W	204	
Keenan I & II	Oklahoma	36°25′N 99°25′W	253	
Kibby Wind Power Project	Maine	45°25′N 70°33′W	132	
King Mountain Wind Farm	Texas	31°14′N 102°14′W	281	
Klondike Wind Farm	Oregon	45°35′N 120°36′W	400	
Lakefield Wind Farm(phase 1&2)	Minnesota	43°42′N 95°09′W	206	
Leaning Juniper Wind Project	Oregon	45°36′N 120°07′W	201	
Lee-Dekalb Wind Energy Center	Illinois	41°43′N 89°02′W	217	
Lincoln Land Wind	Illinois		302	
Limon Wind Energy Center	Colorado	39°23′N 103°34′W	601	
Live Oak	Texas	30°54′N 100°37′W	200	
Locust Ridge Wind Farm	Pennsylvania	40°42′N 76°13′W	128	
Logans Gap Wind Farm	Texas	31°49′N 98°41′W	200	
Lone Star Wind Farm	Texas	32°16′N 99°27′W	400	
Los Vientos Wind Farm	Texas	26°22′N 98°49′W	900	
Lower Snake River Wind Project	Washington	46°32′N 117°36′W	343	
Lundgren Wind Farm	Iowa	42°17′N 93°52′W	250	
Luverne Wind Farm	North Dakota	47°25′N 98°6′W	170	
Magic Valley Wind Farm	Texas	26°25′N 97°34′W	201	
Mammoth Plains	Oklahoma	36°20′N 99°29′W	199	
Maple Ridge Wind Farms I & II	New York	43°45′N 75°33′W	322	
Marble River Wind Farm	New York	44°58′N 73°55′W	215	
Mariah North Wind Farm	Texas	34°32′N 102°55′W	230	
Meadow Lake Wind Farm	Indiana	40°36′N 86°52′W	801	
Mehoopany Wind Farm	Pennsylvania	41°25′N 76°03′W	141	
Meridian Midland wind farm	Michigan		225	
Meridan Way Wind Farm	Kansas	39°25′N 97°42′W	204	
Mesquite Creek Wind	Texas	32°42′N 101°44′W	211	
Miami Wind Energy Center	Texas	35°40′N 100°34′W	289	
Milford Wind Corridor Project	Utah	38°33′N 112°56′W	306	
Minco I, II & III Wind Energy Centers	Oklahoma	35°17′N 98°5′W	200	
Minonk	Illinois	40°52′N 88°57′W	200	
Mount Storm Wind Farm	West Virginia	39°14′N 79°12′W	264	
New Mexico Wind Energy Center	New Mexico	34°35′N 104°2′W	204	
Ninnescah Wind Farm	Kansas	37°35′N 98°35′W	200	
Nobles Wind Farm	Minnesota	43°39′N 95°48′W	201	
North English Wind Farm	Iowa	41°41′N 92°32′W	200	
Northern Colorado Wind Energy Center	Colorado	40°59′N 103°9′W	174	
Oakfield Wind Farm	Maine	46°03′N 68°09′W	148	
O'Brien Wind Farm	Iowa	43°12′N 95°38′W	250	
Odell Wind Farm	Minnesota	43°51′N 94°56′W	200	
Osborn Wind Energy Center	Missouri	39°45′N 94°28′W	200	
Palo Duro Wind Facility	Texas	36°29′N 101°21′W	250	
Panhandle Wind Farm (I & II)	Texas	35°26′N 101°15′W	399	
Panther Creek Wind Farm	Texas	31°58′N 99°54′W	458	
Papalote Creek Wind Farm	Texas	27°59′N 97°23′W	380	
Peetz Table Wind Energy Center	Colorado	40°57′N 103°9′W	430	
Peñascal Wind Farm	Texas	27°07′N 97°32′W	605	
Persimmon Creek 1	Oklahoma	36°11′N 99°25′W	199	
Pilot Hill Wind Farm	Illinois	41°00′N 88°03′W	175	
Pioneer Prairie Wind Farm	Iowa	43°28′N 92°35′W	293	
Pleasant Valley Wind Farm	Minnesota	43°49′N 92°46′W	201	
Plum Creek Wind	Nebraska		230	
Polaris Wind Park	Michigan	43°18′N 84°29′W	168	
Pomeroy Wind Farm (1-4)	Iowa	42°35′N 94°43′W	286	
Post Rock	Kansas	38°50′N 98°27′W	201	
Prairie Breeze Wind Farm	Nebraska	41°52′N 98°0′W	237	
Prairie Queen Wind Farm	Kansas	37°59′N 95°13′W	199	
Prairie Rose	Minnesota	43°42′N 96°10′W	200	
Prairie Winds Wind Farm	South Dakota	48°1′N 101°17′W	151	
Pratt Wind Energy Center	Kansas	37°39′N 98°44′W	220	
Pryor Mountain Wind Farm	Montana	45°08′N 108°41′W	240	
Radford's Run Wind Farm	Illinois	39°42′N 89°01′W	306	
Rattlesnake Creek Wind Farm	Nebraska	42°20′N 96°48′W	318	
Rattlesnake Den Wind Farm	Texas	31°47′N 101°44′W	207	
Red Cloud Wind	New Mexico	34°16′N 105°25′W	350	
Red Dirt Wind Project	Oklahoma	35°54′N 97°45′W	299	
Red Pine Wind	Minnesota	44°26′N 96°18′W	200	
Rim Rock Wind Farm	Montana	48°38′N 111°57′W	189	
Rock Creek Wind Project	Missouri	40°26′N 95°15′W	300	
Rolling Hills Wind Farm	Iowa	41°18′N 94°47′W	444	
Roosevelt Wind Farm	New Mexico	33°56′N 103°31′W	250	
Roscoe Wind Project	Texas	32°16′N 100°21′W	781	
Rush Creek Wind Project	Colorado	39°10′N 103°51′W	600	
Rush Springs Wind Energy Ctr.	Oklahoma	34°41′N 97°50′W	249	
Sage Draw Wind	Texas		338	
San Gorgonio Pass Wind Farm	California	33°55′N 116°35′W	619	
Santa Rita Wind Energy	Texas	31°11′N 101°19′W	300	
Seiling	Oklahoma	36°5′N 98°45′W	299	
Shannon Wind Farm	Texas	33°30′N 98°22′W	204	
Sherbino Wind Farm	Texas	30°49′N 102°22′W	300	
Shepherds Flat Wind Farm	Oregon	45°42′N 120°04′W	845	
Shiloh Wind Farm	California	38°7′N 121°50′W	300	
Smoky Hills Wind Farm	Kansas	38°58′N 98°09′W	251	
South Plains Wind Farm I & II	Texas	34°11′N 101°22′W	500	
Spinning Spur Wind Farm	Texas	35°14′N 102°13′W	516	
Spring Valley Wind Farm	Nevada	39°06′N 114°29′W	152	
Stateline Wind Project	Oregon	46°02′N 118°48′W	300	
Stella Wind Farm	Texas	26°56′N 97°41′W	201	
Stephens Ranch Wind Farm	Texas	32°56′N 101°39′W	376	
Story County Wind Farm I & II	Iowa	42°4′N 93°19′W	300	
Streator Cayuga Ridge South Wind Farm	Illinois	40°57′N 88°29′W	300	
Sweetwater Wind Farm	Texas	32°20′N 100°27′W	585	
Sunflower Wind	Kansas	Marion County	201	
SunZia Wind and Transmission	New Mexico	34°15′N 105°35′W	3650	
Tahoka Wind Farm	Texas	33°09′N 101°41′W	300	
Tatanka Wind Farm	North Dakota; South Dakota	45°56′N 98°58′W	180	
Tecolote Wind	New Mexico	34°22′N 105°26′W	272	
Tehachapi Pass Wind Farm	California	35°06′N 118°17′W	690	
Thunder Ranch Wind Farm	Oklahoma	36°32′N 97°27′W	298	
Timber Road II Wind Farm	Ohio	41°08′N 84°39′W	150	
Top Crop Wind Farm	Illinois	41°10′N 88°38′W	300	
Top of Iowa	Iowa	43°05′N 93°25′W	190	
Traverse Wind Energy Center	Oklahoma	35°33′N 98°41′W	998	
Trinity Hills	Texas	33°26′N 98°46′W	225	
Tucannon River Wind Farm	Washington	46°28′N 117°36′W	267	
Turtle Creek Wind Farm	Iowa	43°22′N 92°47′W	200	
Tuscola Bay	Michigan	43°32′N 83°39′W	120	
Twin Groves Wind Farms I & II	Illinois	40°29′N 88°42′W	396	
Twin Ridges Wind Farm	Pennsylvania	39°46′N 78°52′W	139	
Upstream Wind Energy Center	Nebraska	42°11′N 97°58′W	202	
Voyager Wind (II, III, IV)	California	35°04′N 118°16′W	193	
Wake Wind Farm	Texas	33°50′N 101°06′W	257	
Walnut Ridge Wind Farm	Illinois	41°30′N 89°35′W	212	
Waverly Wind Farm	Kansas	38°14′N 95°52′W	202	
Western Plains Wind Farm	Kansas	37°51′N 99°41′W	280	
Western Spirit Wind	New Mexico		1050	
Western Trail Wind	Texas		367	
Whispering Willow Wind Farm	Iowa	42°37′N 93°18′W	200	
White Creek Wind Power Project	Washington	45°43′N 120°50′W	204	
White Hills	Arizona	35°44′N 114°40′W	324	
Wild Horse Wind Farm	Washington	47°01′N 120°13′W	229	
Wildcat Wind Farm Phase I	Indiana	40°21′N 85°51′W	200	
Willow Springs Wind Farm	Texas	33°21′N 99°39′W	250	
Windy Point/Windy Flats	Washington	45°44′N 120°44′W	400	
TB Flats I & II Wind Farm	Wyoming	42°7′46″N 106°7′30″W	301.1 MW	
Ekola Flats Wind Farm	Wyoming	41°57′10″N 106°19′26″W	250.9 MW	
Roundhouse Wind Farm	Wyoming	41°3′48″N 105°6′24″W	226.56 MW	
Top of the World Wind Farm	Wyoming	42°57′6″N 105°46′22″W	200.2 MW	
Cedar Springs I & II Wind Farm	Wyoming	43°4′45″N 105°27′2″W	398.28 MW	
Rolling Hills Wind Farm	Wyoming	41°41′12″N 97°34′46″W	484.2 MW	

== Offshore wind farms ==
As of 2020, there are two operational offshore wind farms in the United States. Block Island Wind Farm opened in December 2016 in Rhode Island waters. Coastal Virginia Offshore Wind opened in 2020.

== Planned and under construction wind farms ==
Farm	State	Coordinates	Capacity (MW)	Ref
Chokecherry and Sierra Madre Wind Energy Project	Wyoming	41°42′N 107°12′W	2,500–3,000	
Lava Ridge Wind Project	Idaho		1,200	
Horse Heaven Wind Farm (2022)	Washington		1,150	
King Pine wind farm	Maine		1,000	
Clearwater wind farm	Montana		750	
High Banks Wind Farm (2023)	Kansas		600	
Young Wind Farm	Texas		500	
Chevelon Butte wind farm	Arizona		477	
Alle-Catt wind farm	New York		340	
Boswell Springs Wind Farm (2023)	Wyoming		331	
Thunderhead Wind Energy	Nebraska		300	
Seven Cowboy wind farm	Oklahoma		300	
Canisteo wind farm	New York		291	
Sapphire Sky wind farm	Illinois		260	
Badger Wind Farm	North Dakota		250	
25 Mile Creek Wind	Oklahoma		250	
Blackjack Creek Wind Farm	Texas		240	
Great Pathfinder wind farm	Iowa		224	
Ledyard Wind Farm	Iowa		207	
Chowan County Wind Farm (2023)	North Carolina		188	
Delta Wind Farm (2023)	Mississippi		184	
Walleye Wind Farm	Minnesota		110	
Bluestone Wind Farm (2023)	New York		112	
Ball Hill Wind Farm (2023)	New York		108	

== See also ==
- List of offshore wind farms in the United States
- List of U.S. states by electricity production from renewable sources
- List of wind turbine manufacturers
- Renewable portfolio standard
- SunZia Wind and Transmission — 3.5 gigawatt wind farm being developed in New Mexico
- Wind ENergy Data & Information (WENDI) Gateway
- Wind power in the United States
