= XPLR Infrastructure =

American renewable energy company

XPLR Infrastructure, LP
- Company type: Publicly traded subsidiary of NextEra Energy
- Traded as: NYSE: XIFR
- Industry: Renewable energy
- Founded: 2014
- Headquarters: Juno Beach, Florida, United States
- Area served: North America
- Key people: Alan Liu, President & CEO; John Ketchum, Chairman
- Services: Wind power, solar power, and natural gas pipelines
- Revenue: ▲US$ 301 million (2014)
- Operating income: ▲US$ 162 million (2014)
- Net income: ▲US$ 53 million (2014)
- Total assets: ▲US$ 2.7 billion (2014)
- Total equity: ▼US$ 551 million (2014)
- Website: investor.xplrinfrastructure.com

XPLR Infrastructure is a publicly traded subsidiary of NextEra Energy, a Juno Beach, Florida-based renewable energy company.

== History ==
XPLR Infrastructure is a limited partnership formed in 2014 by NextEra Energy.

In June 2014, NextEra Energy announced an initial public offering for NextEra Energy Partners after the previously wholly owned subsidiary was approved for listing on the New York Stock Exchange under the symbol "NEP." Bank of America Merrill Lynch and Goldman Sachs structured the offering.

On January 9, 2015, a subsidiary of the company acquired Palo Duro Wind Project Holdings, LLC and the Palo Duro wind facility in Texas.

In May 2015, the company completed the acquisition of 1,923 MW of contracted wind power projects from NextEra Energy Resources. The acquisition included facilities in North Dakota, Oklahoma, Oregon, and Washington.

In November 2023, NextEra Energy Partners announced that it entered into a definitive agreement with Kinder Morgan, Inc. to sell its Texas natural gas pipeline portfolio for $1.815 billion.

In January 2025, NextEra Energy Partners announced it was changing the company name to XPLR Infrastructure, with a corresponding name in the stock ticker from NEP to XIFR.

== Operations ==
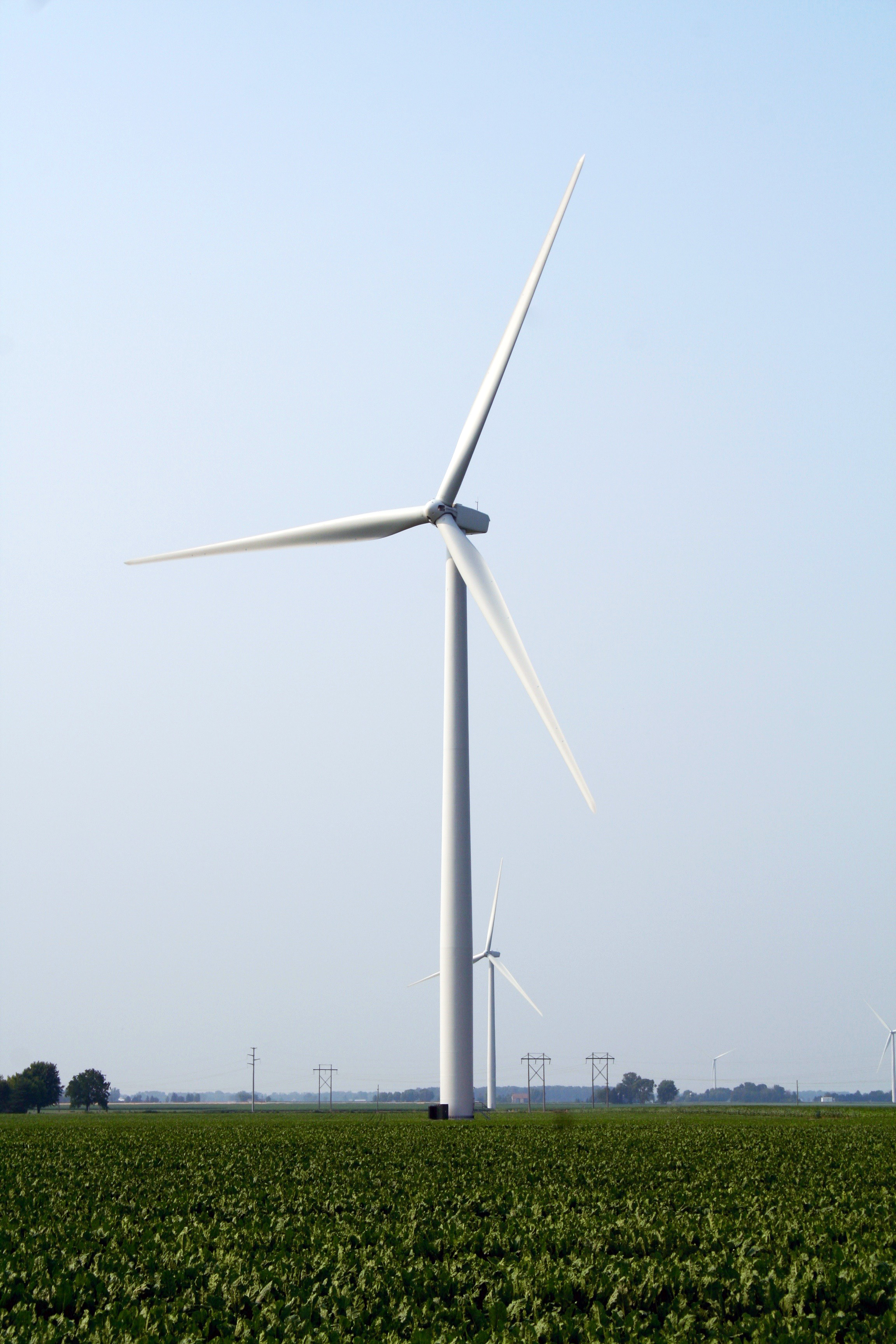
Wind turbines in Tuscola County, Michigan in July 2015.

XPLR Infrastructure purchases and owns wind, solar power, and natural gas pipeline projects in North America.

=== Wind power projects ===
XPLR Infrastructure has wind power projects in multiple North America locations, including:

- Barnes County, North Dakota
- Blaine
- Bluewater
- Burleigh County, North Dakota
- Conestogo, Ontario
- Dewey County, Oklahoma
- Elk City
- Northern Colorado
- Palo Duro Canyon
- Perrin Ranch
- Summerhaven, Arizona
- Tuscola Bay wind farm
- Umatilla County, Oregon
- Walla Walla County, Washington

=== Solar power projects ===
XPLR Infrastructure has solar power projects in multiple North America locations, including:

- Genesis
- Moore
- Sombra, Ontario

== See also ==
- NextEra Energy Resources
