= Javelina Wind Energy Center =

Wind farm in Texas, USA

- Official name: Javelina Wind Energy Center
- Country: United States
- Location: Webb County, Texas
- Coordinates: 27°26′24″N 98°54′36″W
- Status: Operational
- Construction began: 2015
- Commission date: gradually thru 2018
- Construction cost: $1.1 billion
- Owner: NextEra Energy Resources
- Operator: NextEra Energy Resources

Wind farm
- Type: Onshore

Power generation
- Units operational: 346 turbines
- Make and model: 11 GE 1.7 MW; 215 GE 2.0 MW; 120 GE 2.5 MW
- Nameplate capacity: 748.7 MW
- Capacity factor: 43.1% (average 2020-2021)
- Annual net output: 2,827 GW·h

The Javelina Wind Energy Center is a 748.7 megawatt (MW) wind farm in southeast Webb County and southwest Duval County located about 25 miles (40 km) east of Laredo, Texas. The project was developed by Bordas Renewable Energy and NextEra Energy Resources in three phases that came online starting 2015. As of 2018, Javelina and adjacent wind farms create a contiguous facility with over 1 gigawatt (GW) of electricity generation.

== Details ==
The number of wind farms throughout South Texas has grown rapidly since about 2010 due to a combination of high regional demand growth, productive wind resources, and less encumbered land and transmission capacity. The 150 MW Cedro Hill Wind project was the first to come online in Webb County in 2010, and was soon abutted to the southwest by the 91.2 MW Whitetail Wind in 2012. The first 248.7 MW phase of Javelina Wind joined this grouping in 2015 and is adjacently located to the southeast. It was abutted to the southwest by a second 200 MW phase of Javelina, also named Albercas Wind, in 2016. The third 300 MW phase of Javelina, also named Torrecillas Wind, was completed in 2018 and filled out the remainder of the southeast corner of Webb County. It extends into southwest Duval county, and nearly links with the 78 MW Sendero Wind completed in 2015 in northwest Jim Hogg County.

The facility is located in a region with even more rapidly expanding unconventional oil and gas development activity, such as that extending from the Eagle Ford Shale Play.

All three phases of the Javelina Wind Energy Center utilize wind turbines from GE Wind Energy. Phase I includes eleven 1.7 MW and 115 2.0 MW turbines, while phase II adds another 100 2.0 MW units. Phase III consists of 120 2.5 MW turbines. The electricity is being sold under multiple power purchase agreements, including contracts with the South Texas Electric Cooperative, Dow Chemical, and AT&T.

== Electricity production ==
Javelina Wind Energy Center Electricity Generation (MW·h)
| Year | Javelina I Javelina (248.7 MW) | Javelina II Albercas (200 MW) | Javelina III Torrecillas (300 MW) | Total Annual MW·h |
|---|---|---|---|---|
| 2015 | 56,434* | - | - | 56,434 |
| 2016 | 912,017 | 69,982* | - | 981,999 |
| 2017 | 946,436 | 772,358 | - | 1,718,794 |
| 2018 | 962,468 | 798,214 | - | 1,760,682 |
| 2019 | 966,591 | 756,144 | 966,586* | 2,689,321 |
| 2020 | 945,992 | 773,696 | 1,141,336 | 2,861,024 |
| 2021 | 927,307 | 764,958 | 1,100,897 | 2,793,162 |
| Average Annual Production (years 2020-2021) ---> | | | | 2,827,093 |
| Average Capacity Factor (years 2020-2021) ---> | | | | 43.1% |

(*) partial year of operation

== See also ==
- Wind power in Texas
- List of wind farms in the United States
