= TB Flats I & II Wind Farm =

Wind farm in Wyoming

- Country: United States
- Location: Wyoming
- Coordinates: 42°11′36.7″N 106°7′15.4″W
- Status: Operational
- Construction began: 2019
- Commission date: 2021
- Owner: PacifiCorp

Wind farm
- Type: Onshore
- Hub height: 80-82 m
- Rotor diameter: 110-136 m

Power generation
- Make and model: Vestas V110-2.0, Vestas V136-4.3
- Nameplate capacity: 301.1 MW

TB Flats I & II Wind Farm is a 301.1-megawatt onshore wind farm located in Carbon County and Albany County, Wyoming, United States. The project was developed by Invenergy and later transferred to PacifiCorp as part of their Energy Vision 2020 initiative. It comprises 132 turbines manufactured by Vestas, specifically the V110-2.0 MW and V136-4.3 MW models.

== Substation and transmission ==
The Aeolus substation near Medicine Bow serves as a critical connection point for TB Flats I & II, linking the wind farm to the broader PacifiCorp transmission grid. PacifiCorp’s Gateway South transmission project facilitates the delivery of wind-generated power to neighboring states.

== Economic and environmental impact ==
The construction and operation of TB Flats I & II created between 1,100 and 1,600 jobs during the development phase and is expected to generate approximately $120 million in tax revenue over its lifetime. The wind farm contributes to diversifying Wyoming’s economy while providing clean, renewable energy capable of powering more than 100,000 homes annually.

== Development and construction ==
The development of TB Flats I & II began under Invenergy in 2019. Construction was completed in 2020, with the farm becoming operational in 2021. The wind farm consists of three sections:

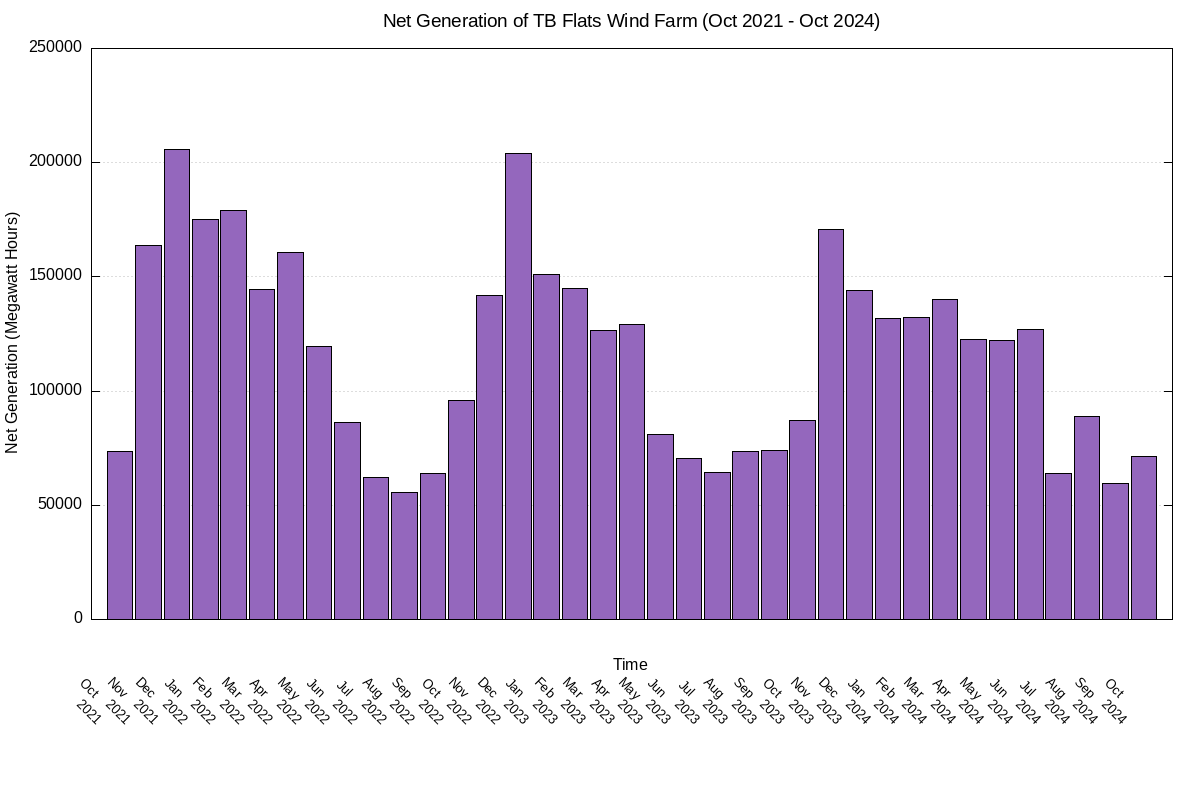
Tb flats net generation Oct 2021 - Oct 2024

TB Flats Wind Farm Technical Details
Part	County	Turbine Model	Number of Turbines	Unit Power	Total Power	Rotor Diameter	Hub Height
Part 1	Carbon, Albany	Vestas V110/2000	28	2 MW	56 MW	110 m	80-82 m
Part 2	Carbon, Albany	Vestas V136/4000-4200	47	4 MW	202.1 MW	136 m	80-82 m
Part 3	Carbon, Albany	Vestas V136/4000-4200	57	4 MW	245.1 MW	136 m	80-82 m

== Energy production ==
TB Flats Wind Farm Monthly Net Generation (MWh)
Year	Jan	Feb	Mar	Apr	May	Jun	Jul	Aug	Sep	Oct	Nov	Dec	Annual Total
2021	—	—	—	—	—	—	—	—	—	73,457	163,903	205,908	443,268
2022	175,066	179,232	144,418	160,605	119,589	86,417	62,146	55,642	63,942	95,795	141,891	204,243	1,488,986
2023	151,082	144,760	126,643	129,048	81,060	70,709	64,374	73,547	73,811	86,982	170,857	143,895	1,316,768
2024	131,988	132,410	140,130	122,550	122,272	126,773	63,755	88,736	59,621	71,421	—	—	1,059,656

== See also ==
- List of wind farms in the United States
- PacifiCorp
- Vestas
