= New Mexico Wind Energy Center =

Coordinates: 34.6356°N 104.0473°W

The New Mexico Wind Energy Center is a wind farm in New Mexico. It is 170 miles southeast of Albuquerque and 20 miles northeast of Fort Sumner and opened on October 1, 2003. It is owned and managed by FPL Energy, who sell the energy to PNM Resources.

== See also ==
- List of wind farms
- List of wind farms in the United States
