= Flat Ridge Wind Farm =

Wind farm in Kansas, USA

- Official name: Flat Ridge Wind Farm
- Country: United States
- Location: 50 miles (80 km) southwest of Wichita, Kansas
- Coordinates: 37°21′59″N 98°15′40″W
- Owners: Flat Ridge 1: Westar Energy (50%), BP Alternative Energy (50%); Flat Ridge 2: Sempra Energy (50%), BP Alternative Energy (50%)
- Operators: BP Alternative Energy (dba AE Power Services)

Wind farm
- Type: Onshore

Power generation
- Units operational: 334 turbines
- Make and model: Clipper C96-2.5 MW, GE 1.6 MW
- Nameplate capacity: 570.4 MW
- Capacity factor: 41.8% (average 2013-2017)
- Annual net output: 2,091 GW·h

The Flat Ridge Wind Farm is an electricity generating wind facility spanning the intersection of Barber, Harper and Kingman County in the U.S. state of Kansas, located about 50 miles (80 km) southwest of the city of Wichita. It was constructed in two phases and has a total generating capacity of 570.4 megawatts (MW), becoming the largest such facility in the state upon its completion in 2012.

== Facility details ==
Flat Ridge 1 was jointly developed, financed, and continues to be jointly owned by BP Alternative Energy and Westar Energy. BP is also selling its share of the power generated to Westar, which is the largest electricity distributor in Kansas. This initial phase consists of 40 Clipper Liberty C96 wind turbines, each rated at 2.5 MW, for a total capacity of 100 MW.

Construction began in May 2008 covering about 5,000 acres of farm and ranch land in eastern Barber County. Signal Wind Energy was awarded the contract to erect the turbines and build the balance of the plant; including all access roads, turbine foundations, and the electrical collection and transmission system. Flat Ridge 1 was fully online by the middle of 2009, and is operated and maintained by BP's AE Power Services.

Flat Ridge 2 was initially developed by BP Alternative Energy for a capacity of 419.2 MW, and was then expanded by 51.2 MW to meet further demand. This phase consists of 294 GE 1.6 MW wind turbines. The electricity is being sold under separate power purchase agreements to utilities in Missouri, Arkansas, and Louisiana. BP and Sempra Energy jointly own and financed the nearly $800 million project.

Blattner Energy was awarded the construction contract for phase 2. It is thus far one of the largest projects in the U.S. to be built in a single phase, creating about 500 construction jobs, and 30 long-term positions. In addition to the 66,000 acre plant, a new 46 mile transmission line was built to a 345kV substation in Sumner County. Flat Ridge 2 reached full capacity in December 2012, and is also operated and maintained by AE Power Services.

== Electricity production ==
Flat Ridge Wind Electricity Generation (MW·h)
Year	Flat Ridge (1) Westar Energy (50 MW)	Flat Ridge (1) AE Power Services (50 MW)	Flat Ridge 2 AE Power Services (470.4 MW)	Total Annual MW·h
2009	88,223*	78,977*	-	167,200
2010	156,538	154,698	-	311,236
2011	159,044	159,141	-	318,185
2012	143,723	147,793	222,586*	514,102
2013	127,869	136,776	1,830,876	2,095,521
2014	131,894	133,776	1,921,860	2,187,530
2015	146,968	140,907	1,737,974	2,025,849
2016	145,288	159,431	1,767,716	2,072,435
2017	149,633	161,942	1,759,999	2,071,574
2018	NR	NR	1,836,802	-
Average Annual Production (years 2013–2017) :				2,090,582
Average Capacity Factor (years 2013–2017) :				41.8%

(*) partial year of operation
(NR) not yet reported

== See also ==
- Wind power in Kansas
- List of wind farms in the United States
