= SunZia Wind and Transmission =

Wind farm in New Mexico, US

SunZia Wind
- Country: United States
- Location: New Mexico
- Coordinates: 34°15′2″N 105°35′44″W
- Status: Operational
- Construction began: 2023
- Commission date: 2026
- Construction cost: $11B
- Owner: Pattern Energy

Wind farm
- Type: Onshore

Power generation
- Make and model: GE & Vestas
- Nameplate capacity: 3.5 GW

External links
- Website: patternenergy.com/projects/sunzia/

SunZia Wind is a 3.5-gigawatt wind farm in New Mexico, United States, in Lincoln County, San Miguel County and Torrance County. Upon completion, it became the largest wind project in the western hemisphere. The wind project is paired with SunZia Transmission, a 550-mile (890 km), 3-gigawatt HVDC transmission line to carry the power to Arizona and California. SunZia Wind and Transmission are owned by the privately held American company Pattern Energy. The project reached $11B of funding in late 2023. Construction started in 2023 and was completed in 2026, after which Pattern Energy brought the farm online.

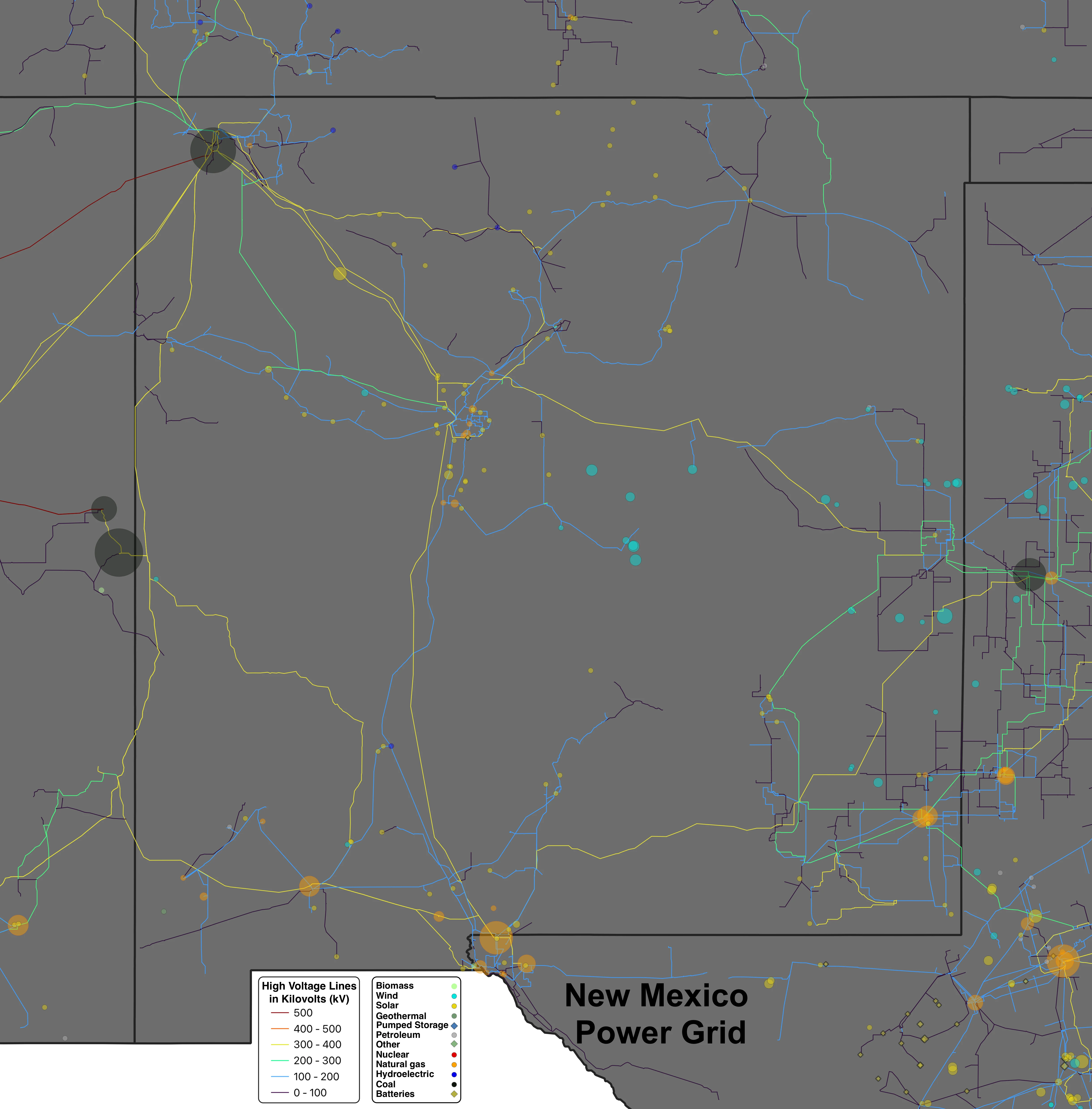
New Mexico power grid

The wind farm includes 916 wind turbines in Estancia Valley.

The 550-mile (890 km) transmission line connects the SunZia wind farm in central New Mexico to Pinal county in south-central Arizona. It consists of two 525 kV high-voltage direct current (HVDC) transmission lines with a total capacity of 3,000 MW of electrical power.

== History ==
The SunZia transmission line was approved by the Arizona Corporation Commission in 2016, after a 10-year planning process. At the time, the line was planned to be AC, not DC. Environmentalists opposed the project, concerned about the line passing through the San Pedro River (Arizona) Valley and fearing that it might be used to transfer fossil-fuel generated electricity. The project was backed by a consortium of local power companies.

In 2018, the New Mexico Public Regulation Commission rejected SunZia's transmission line project and requested that SunZia resubmit a more detailed application. The New Mexico PRC later approved this project in December 2022.

Pattern Energy purchased the rights to the Mesa Canyons Wind Farm from Clean Line Energy Partners in May 2018. The Mesa Canyons Wind Farm is a planned 1 GW wind farm just north of Corona.

Pattern Energy received unanimous approval October 5, 2018 by the New Mexico Public Regulation Commission for its wind farm project, which was then called Corona Wind Projects, along with the Western Spirit Wind Farm. This combined with the Mesa Canyons Wind Farm gives the 3 GW of power that is projected to be exported to the west via the SunZia power line.

Pattern Energy bought the SunZia transmission line project from SouthWestern Power Group in July 2022.

Pattern Energy signed a power purchase agreement with Shell and University of California in 2023.

Groundbreaking for the transmission line was held in September 2023. In November 2023, the Bureau of Land Management temporarily halted work on the project due to concerns of the Tohono O'odham Nation and the San Carlos Apache Tribe that the project damages religious and cultural sites in a 50-mile portion (80 km) of the San Pedro Valley in southeastern Arizona, but lifted the suspension later that month, allowing work to resume.

In 2023, Pattern Energy ordered 674 General Electric 3.6 MW turbines (2.4 GW) and 242 Vestas V163-4.5 MW turbines (1.1 GW) while foundations were being dug. Pattern Energy completed the wind farm in 2026.

== Legal challenges ==
=== Arizona state courts ===
A 2023 case in Arizona Superior Court asked that SunZia's amended Certificate of Environmental Compatibility (CEC) for Arizona be voided. The plaintiff stated that the Arizona Corporation Commission (ACC) failed to adequately consider dramatic changes in the SunZia project when granting the amended Certificate. He pointed out that the project’s original CEC, granted in 2015, was based on the benefits to Arizona of a multipoint AC line. The amended CEC is for a point-to-point DC line, which would not provide similar benefits to the state. The case asked that SunZia’s amended CEC be voided and the decision be remanded to the Commission.

On August 25, 2023, the Superior Court affirmed the ACC's decision. The plaintiff appealed this decision to the Arizona Court of Appeals on October 25, 2023. His attorneys filed their opening brief on December 14, 2023. On June 13, 2024, the Court of Appeals in Tucson affirmed the decision of the Superior Court, which upheld the ACC's decision to grant the amended CEC for the SunZia transmission line through Arizona.

=== Federal courts ===
A separate lawsuit was filed in U.S. District Court in Tucson, Arizona, in January 2024. The plaintiffs asked for a permanent injunction to halt construction of the transmission line through the San Pedro Valley because of the cultural significance of the valley to several Native American communities.

On January 30th, 2024, the Tohono O'odham Nation and San Carlos Apache Tribe filed a motion for a temporary restraining order and preliminary injunction to stop the construction, as well as a request for an expedited hearing for their lawsuit previously filed on January 17, 2024. A Motion Hearing was held March 13, 2024, in the United States District Court in Tucson, Arizona. The motion was denied in April.

The Tohono O'odham Nation, San Carlos Apache Tribe, Archaeology Southwest, and the Center for Biological Diversity appealed in the U.S. Ninth Circuit Court of Appeals the U.S. District Judge's dismissal of the case against the SunZia transmission line. Oral arguments were heard in Phoenix, AZ on March 26, 2025. On May 27, 2025 the 9th Circuit Court sided with the tribes and nonprofits when they reversed and remanded the lower court's action.

The four plaintiffs in the lawsuit opposing the SunZia powerline through the San Pedro Valley filed a Motion for Summary Justice in Arizona District Court, Tucson on March 13, 2026. This is after the 9th Circuit Court of Appeals reversed the earlier District Court decision and remanded the case to the lower court. The tribe and nonprofit plaintiffs request that the judge void the Bureau of Land Management’s authorization of the powerline route.

=== Arizona legislature ===
In addition, some in the Arizona legislature have also weighed in on the SunZia Transmission Project through their state. On March 25, 2024, twelve Arizona state legislators sent a letter to the Arizona Corporation Commission expressing their concerns. The legislators asked the Commission to review their previous actions and ensure that the concerns of Arizona ratepayers are adequately addressed.

== See also ==
- List of wind farms in the United States
