= Spinning Spur Wind Ranch =

Wind farm in Texas, USA

- Official name: Spinning Spur Wind Ranch
- Country: United States
- Location: Oldham County, Texas
- Coordinates: 35°16′37″N 102°40′58″W
- Construction began: June 2012
- Commission date: gradually thru Sept 2015
- Owners: Google (SS1), EDF Renewables (SS2), BlackRock and EDF Renewables (SS3)
- Operator: EDF Renewable Services

Wind farm
- Type: Onshore

Power generation
- Units operational: 254 turbines
- Make and model: 70 Siemens SWT-2.3 MW; 87 GE 1.85 MW; 97 Vestas V100-2 MW
- Nameplate capacity: 516 MW
- Capacity factor: 46.5% (average 2016-2017)
- Annual net output: 2,100 GW·h

The Spinning Spur Wind Ranch is a 516 megawatt (MW) wind farm spanning the length of southern Oldham County in the northwest panhandle region of the U.S. state of Texas. The project was developed by Cielo Wind Power and EDF Renewable Energy in three phases that came online from 2012 to 2015. Phases 2 and 3 are enabled by the Competitive Renewable Energy Zone (CREZ) transmission infrastructure completed in 2013 that was designed to bring electricity generated in energy-resource-rich western regions to industrialized population centers in the central and eastern regions of the state.

== Details ==
Construction began in June 2012 on the first phase of the facility located 30 miles west of Amarillo and spread over nearly 38,500 acres. It completed in December 2012 and includes 70 Siemens SWT-2.3 MW wind turbines having blade diameters of over 100 meters. The electricity is being sold to Amarillo-based Southwestern Public Service Company (a subsidiary of Xcel Energy) which services customers throughout western Texas and eastern New Mexico. Google announced upon the projects completion that it had invested $200 million in ownership of the facility.

Construction on the second phase began in June 2013 located 40 miles west of Amarillo and spread over an additional nearly 14,000 acres. It completed in December 2013 and includes 87 GE 1.85 MW turbines having 87 meter blade diameters. For the first ten years, the electricity is being sold into the ERCOT grid which services 90% of the consumption in the state. This portion of the facility is solely owned by EDF Renewable Energy, with financing assistance from GE Energy Financial Services and MUFG Union Bank.

The third phase of construction began in October 2014 and completed in September 2015. It is located 50 miles west of Amarillo and spread over 18,000 acres. It uses 97 Vestas V100-2.0 MW turbines with 100 meter blade diameters. The electricity is being sold to utilities in the City of Georgetown and the City of Garland. It provides for the majority of the consumption by Georgetown, which aims to source 100% of its electricity from renewables. BlackRock announced upon the projects completion that it had taken a 50% ownership stake in the facility, along with EDF Renewable Energy.

EDF Renewable Energy provides operational and maintenance support for all three phases of the facility via continuous monitoring from its operations and control center.

== Electricity production ==
Spinning Spur Electricity Generation (MW·h)
Year	Spinning Spur 1 (161 MW)	Spinning Spur 2 (161 MW)	Spinning Spur 3 (194 MW)	Total Annual MW·h
2012	52,370*	-	-	52,370
2013	687,016	-	-	687,016
2014	712,566	232,131*	-	944,697
2015	666,425	547,504	224,955*	1,438,884
2016	686,636	611,912	814,372	2,112,920
2017	679,474	596,215	811,106	2,086,795
Average Annual Production (years 2016-2017) →				2,099,858
Average Capacity Factor (years 2016-2017) →				46.5%

(*) partial year of operation

== See also ==
- Wind power in Texas
- List of wind farms in the United States
