= Vansycle Wind Project =

Wind farm in Umatilla County, Oregon

The Vansycle I Wind Project (formerly Vansycle Wind Project) is a wind farm in Umatilla County, Oregon. It consists of 38 Vestas 0.66 MW wind turbines at the upper end of Vansycle Canyon with a collective nameplate generating capacity of 25.08 MW. The project was the first commercial wind energy project constructed and operated in Oregon and began operation in December 1998.

The wind turbines were constructed on leased portions of privately owned farms thereby sparing developers from buying property for the turbines and allowing farmers to generate extra income. Like nearby Stateline Wind Project, Vansycle Wind Project is owned and operated by NextEra Energy Resources, formerly known as FPL Energy.

The approximate center of the wind farm is located about 17 miles (27 km) west-southwest of Walla Walla, Washington, at 45.923°N 118.630°W. The project consists of two separate strings of 28 and 10 turbines respectively. The center of the western string of 28 turbines is located at about 45.939°N 118.665°W. The center of the eastern string of 10 turbines is located at about 45.921°N 118.605°W.

relative location of edges	location
NW end	45.949°N 118.680°W
SE end	45.918°N 118.600°W

The Vansycle II Wind Project consists of 43 Siemens 2.3 MW wind turbines for a total nameplate generating capacity of 98.9 MW and is erected to the east and south of the earlier Vansycle I Wind Power project. The Vansycle II project went into commercial operation on December 7, 2009.

== See also ==
- Wind power in the United States
