= Leaning Juniper Wind Project =

Wind farm in Oregon, United States

Coordinates: 45.609024°N 120.118504°W

The Leaning Juniper Wind Project is an electricity generating wind farm facility located in Gilliam County, Oregon, United States with a total generating capacity of 301.5 megawatts. It is owned by PacifiCorp and began operations in 2006. Leaning Juniper I became operational in September 2006 with 67 1.5 MW wind turbines with a capacity of 100.5 megawatts. "Leaning Juniper II includes 133 GE 1.5 MW wind turbines with a capacity of 201 MW. This phase came online in 2011." The Jones Canyon Substation was built as part of this project and to support other wind projects in the area.

== See also ==
- List of wind farms in the United States
- Wind power in Oregon
