= Cedar Springs I & II Wind Farm =

Wind farm complex in Wyoming

Cedar Springs Wind Farm Complex
- Country: United States
- Location: Converse County, Wyoming
- Coordinates: Cedar Springs I: 43°04′45″N 105°27′02″W Cedar Springs II: 42°57′02″N 105°21′15″W Cedar Springs III: 43°06′44″N 105°31′06″W
- Status: Operational
- Construction began: 2020
- Commission date: 2020
- Owners: Blattner Energy, PacifiCorp
- Operator: Blattner Energy

Wind farm
- Type: Onshore
- Hub height: GE 2.8-127: 89 m; GE 2.3-116: 80 m
- Rotor diameter: GE 2.8-127: 127 m; GE 2.3-116: 116 m

Power generation
- Make and model: Cedar Springs I & II: 72 × GE 2.8-127 (2.8 MW); 72 × GE 2.3-116 (2.3 MW); Cedar Springs III: 44 × GE 2.8-127 (2.8 MW); 4 × GE 2.3-116 (2.3 MW)
- Nameplate capacity: 531.56 MW: Cedar Springs I: 199.4 MW; Cedar Springs II: 198.88 MW; Cedar Springs III: 133.28 MW

'Cedar Springs Wind Farm Complex is a 531.56-megawatt onshore wind farm located in Converse County, Wyoming, United States. The $600 million project consists of three phases with a total of 192 turbines and became operational in 2020.

[Previous sections remain the same until Economic Impact]

== Economic and environmental impact ==
The construction of the wind farm created approximately 400 jobs during development, including 40 positions filled by displaced oil and gas workers. The project is expected to provide over $100 million in tax revenue over its lifetime, funding local schools and public services. The wind farm generates enough energy to power approximately 120,000 homes annually.

== Project overview ==
The complex consists of three phases:

- Cedar Springs I: 199.4 MW (72 turbines)
- Cedar Springs II: 198.88 MW (72 turbines)
- Cedar Springs III: 133.28 MW (48 turbines)

== Turbine specifications ==
The wind farm employs two types of GE turbines across its three phases:

Cedar Springs I & II:

- GE 2.8-127: 89 m hub height, 127 m rotor diameter
- GE 2.3-116: 80 m hub height, 116 m rotor diameter

Cedar Springs III:

- 44 × GE Energy 2.8-127 (124.08 MW total)
- 4 × GE Energy 2.3-116 (9.2 MW total)

== Location ==
The wind farm is located approximately 50 miles northeast of Casper and about 30 miles northwest of Douglas.

The three phases are located in Converse County:

- Cedar Springs I: 43°04′45″N 105°27′02″W
- Cedar Springs II: 42°57′02″N 105°21′15″W
- Cedar Springs III: 43°06′44″N 105°31′06″W

== Development and construction ==
The project was developed by Cedar Springs Transmission and Orion Wind Resources, with Blattner Energy handling construction. All three phases were completed in 2020. Construction began in spring 2020, with turbine installation starting in May. The project employed both local contractors and materials where possible, contributing to the local economy through accommodation, fuel, and other local services. The construction was completed on schedule by December 2020, transitioning to a permanent staff of 20 full-time employees.

== Power purchase agreement ==
The power generated from Cedar Springs I is sold to PacifiCorp under a power purchase agreement for 200 MW, starting in 2020.

== Economic and environmental impact ==
The construction of the wind farm created hundreds of jobs and is projected to provide millions in tax revenue over its operational lifespan. It generates enough energy to power approximately 120,000 homes annually.

== Workplace safety ==
On August 5, 2024, an accident occurred at the Cedar Springs wind energy construction site. A crane toppled, resulting in the death of a 55-year-old crane operator, John William Hoffpauir, Jr., of Louisiana. The incident is under investigation by Wyoming OSHA.

== See also ==
- List of wind farms in the United States
- PacifiCorp
