= Papalote Creek Wind Farm =

Wind farm in Texas, USA

- Official name: Papalote Creek Wind Farm
- Country: United States
- Location: San Patricio County, Texas
- Coordinates: 27°58′48″N 97°23′28″W
- Construction began: 2009
- Commission date: 2010
- Owner: E.ON
- Operator: E.ON

Wind farm
- Type: Onshore

Power generation
- Units operational: 196 turbines
- Make and model: Vestas V82-1.65 MW; Siemens SWT-2.3 MW
- Nameplate capacity: 380 MW
- Capacity factor: 34.2% (average 2011-2017)
- Annual net output: 1,139 GW·h

The Papalote Creek Wind Farm near Taft, Texas in San Patricio County is an array of 196 wind turbines that can produce 380 megawatts (MW) of power, enough to serve approximately 114,000 homes. The wind farm was built and is operated by E.ON Climate and Renewables North America.

== Details ==
The first phase of 109 Vestas 1.65 megawatt turbines came on line in the fall of 2009. The second phase of 87 Siemens 2.3 megawatt turbines came on line in winter 2010. All turbines are approximately 262 feet high and have three blades. The turbines have a maximum speed of 22 rotations per minute.

The majority of the electricity generated is sold to the Lower Colorado River Authority, and to CPS Energy which is owned by the City of San Antonio.

The land for the wind farm is privately owned and leased to E.ON. The lease agreement allows for other uses of the land such as farming and ranching. The wind farm has added more than $500 million in value to the property tax base of San Patricio County and local school districts. Additional turbines may be added to the wind farm in the future.

The wind farm is located about 20 miles from where Hurricane Harvey made landfall on August 25, 2017, and experienced wind speeds of 90 mph, shutting the wind farm down. Downed power lines delayed operation for a few days before the wind farm became operational again.

== Electricity production ==
Papalote Creek Electricity Generation (MW·h)
Year	Papalote Creek 1 (179.9 MW)	Papalote Creek 2 (200.1 MW)	Total Annual MW·h
2009	119,924*	-	119,924
2010	536,329	-	536,329
2011	616,966	685,950	1,302,916
2012	546,085	615,967	1,162,052
2013	557,093	629,252	1,186,345
2014	571,767	652,243	1,224,010
2015	483,294	550,354	1,033,648
2016	475,691	509,267	984,958
2017	510,214	567,442	1,077,656
Average Annual Production (years 2011-2017) :			1,138,798
Average Capacity Factor (years 2012-2017) :			34.2%

(*) partial year of operation

== See also ==
- Wind power in Texas
- List of wind farms in the United States
