= Tuscola Bay wind farm =

Wind farm

- Official name: Tuscola Bay Wind Energy Center
- Country: United States
- Location: Fairgrove, Tuscola County, Michigan
- Coordinates: 43°31′26″N 83°39′11″W
- Commission date: December 2012
- Owner: NextEra Energy Resources

Wind farm
- Type: Onshore
- Site usage: Commercial
- Hub height: 262 feet (80 m)
- Rotor diameter: 150 feet (46 m)

Power generation
- Units operational: 75
- Make and model: GE Energy
- Nameplate capacity: 120 MW (1.6 MW per unit)

The Tuscola Bay wind farm, located in Fairgrove, Michigan and owned by NextEra Energy Partners, was put into operation in 2012. Each of the 75 wind turbines in the farm is 262 feet high, with a blade length of 150 feet. The output of each turbine is 1.6 megawatts, with a total farm output of 120 megawatts.
