= Waverly Wind Farm =

Wind farm near Waverly, Kansas, United States

- Country: United States of America
- Location: near Waverly, Kansas
- Coordinates: 38.33184°N 95.59138°W
- Status: Operational
- Construction began: August 2014
- Commission date: 2016
- Owner: EDP Renewables
- Employees: 19

Wind farm
- Type: Onshore
- Hub height: 305 ft (93 m)

Power generation
- Units operational: 95
- Nameplate capacity: 199 MW

The Waverly Wind Farm is a wind powered electricity generation project in Kansas owned and operated by EDP Renewables. This site is located near Waverly, in Coffey County. The wind farm consists of 95 wind turbines over 25 square miles, generating up to 199 MW.

It consists of 90 Siemens Gamesa 2.1MW and 5 Gamesa 2MW turbines.

== See also ==
- List of wind farms in the United States
