= Capricorn Ridge Wind Farm =

Wind farm in Texas, US

- Country: United States
- Location: Texas
- Coordinates: 31.903°N 100.901°W
- Status: Operational
- Commission date: 2007
- Owner: NextEra Energy Resources

Wind farm
- Type: Onshore

Power generation
- Units operational: 407
- Make and model: GE Wind Energy: GE 1.5MW; Siemens: Siemens 2.3MW
- Nameplate capacity: 662.5 MW
- Capacity factor: 33.2% (average 2010-2018)
- Annual net output: 1,927 GW·h

The Capricorn Ridge Wind Farm is located in Sterling and Coke counties, Texas. The wind farm does not create any air and water pollution to the surrounding counties. It is a 662.5 MW wind farm, with 342 GE 1.5 MW wind turbines and 65 2.3 MW Siemens turbines that are capable of generating enough electricity for more than 220,000 homes. With all four phases combined, there should be over 400 turbines after the project commissioned in 2007. The wind farm is built, owned and operated by a subsidiary of NextEra Energy Resources, the U.S.' largest wind energy generator who is also known for generating electricity using methane gas, oil solar, wind and nuclear. This company, together with its subsidiaries owns, operates, develops, constructs and manages electricity and energy generating facilities in not only the U.S. but also in Canada and Spain. The project is part owned by San Antonio-based Sullivan Trillian Fund Private Equity. Its property Offtaker is Energy Market- ERCOT.

== Facility details ==
The Capricorn Ridge's first phase began commercial operation in 2007 and the second phase in 2008, with it nearly jumping up to a capacity of 506.5 MW from 364 MW during the first quarter! The purpose of this project was to reduce the reliance Texas had on fossil fuels by producing renewable wind energy. Another pro to the wind farm is that it would be boosting the local economy with more jobs and land lease payments with also maintaining the surrounding agricultural land. Texas was also one of the three states that is the best to build turbines in with the other two being Kansas and North Dakota. The Capricorn Ridge project supply and provide enough clean and renewable energy to power an estimated 220,000 households. The Capricorn Ridge Wind project was the very first wind project in the United States to sell offsets that were verified under VCS (Verified Carbon Standard), which happens to be based on Kyoto Protocol's Clean Development Mechanism. Capricorn Ridge was included in two lists between the years 2010–2011. In 2010, Texas itself was rated as one of the states leading its way in installed wind power capacity by the Energy Efficiency and Renewable Energy unit of the U.S. Department of Energy with 10,089 megawatts. Capricorn Ridge itself in 2011 was listed fourth being one of the largest wind farms coming in with 662.5 megawatts.

On 27 February 2012, GE Energy Financial Services and Lestis Private Capital Group announced that they had joined U.S. bank JPMorgan Chase to invest $225 million in the wind farm.

Capricorn Ridge Wind Warm is sponsored by Sustainable Travel International as an emissions reduction project, with proceeds from carbon offsets benefiting the project.

== Electricity production ==
Capricorn Ridge Wind Farm Generation (MW·h)
Year	Total Annual MW·h
2008	1,460,355
2009	1,155,420
2010	1,740,178
2011	2,039,176
2012	2,016,999
2013	1,983,817
2014	2,066,584
2015	1,659,524
2016	1,829,154
2017	1,821,192
2018	2,183,532
Average _{(years 2010–2018)} :	1,926,684

== See also ==
- List of onshore wind farms
- Wind power in the United States
- Wind power in Texas
