= Fenton Wind Farm =

Wind energy project Minnesota

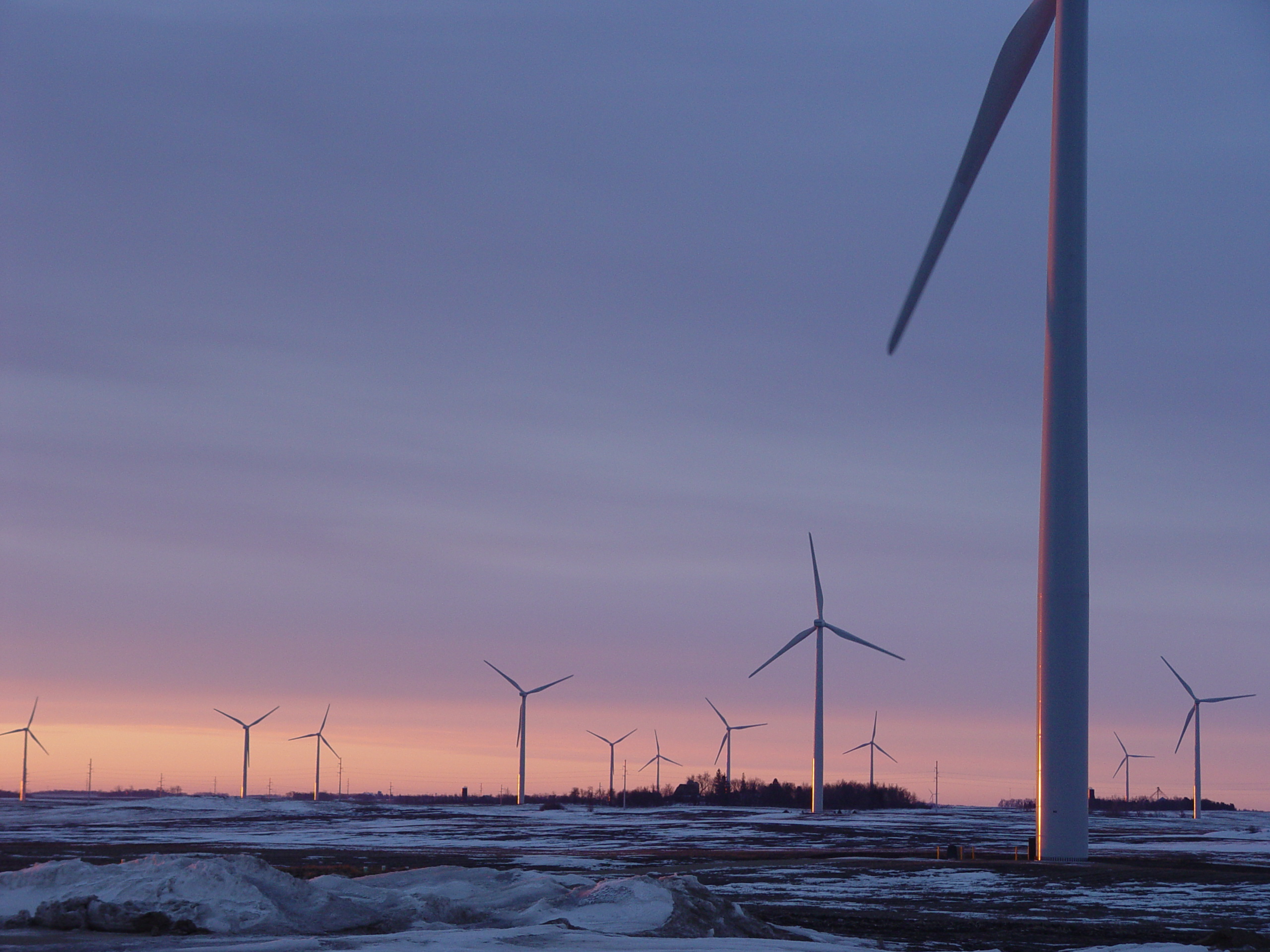
- Country: United States
- Location: Minnesota
- Coordinates: 43°52′29.44″N 95°54′42.03″W
- Status: Operational
- Construction began: 2007
- Commission date: 2007
- Construction cost: $385M

Wind farm
- Type: Onshore

Power generation
- Make and model: GE 1.5 MW
- Nameplate capacity: 205.5 MW

External links
- Website: web.archive.org/web/20140814234008/http://www.edf-re.com/projects/detail/fenton/

The Fenton Wind Farm is a 205.5 megawatt wind energy project built by enXco (now EDF Renewables), that became operational in the second half of 2007. The $385-million project is near Chandler, Minnesota, United States, on a site that encompasses Murray and Nobles counties and consists of 137 GE 1.5 MW wind turbines.

Power generated by the Fenton Wind Energy project will be sold to Northern States Power, a subsidiary of Minneapolis-based Xcel Energy.

The land was and is subject to archeological surveys as it is situated in a culturally sensitive area previously inhabited by the Dakota.

== Project history ==
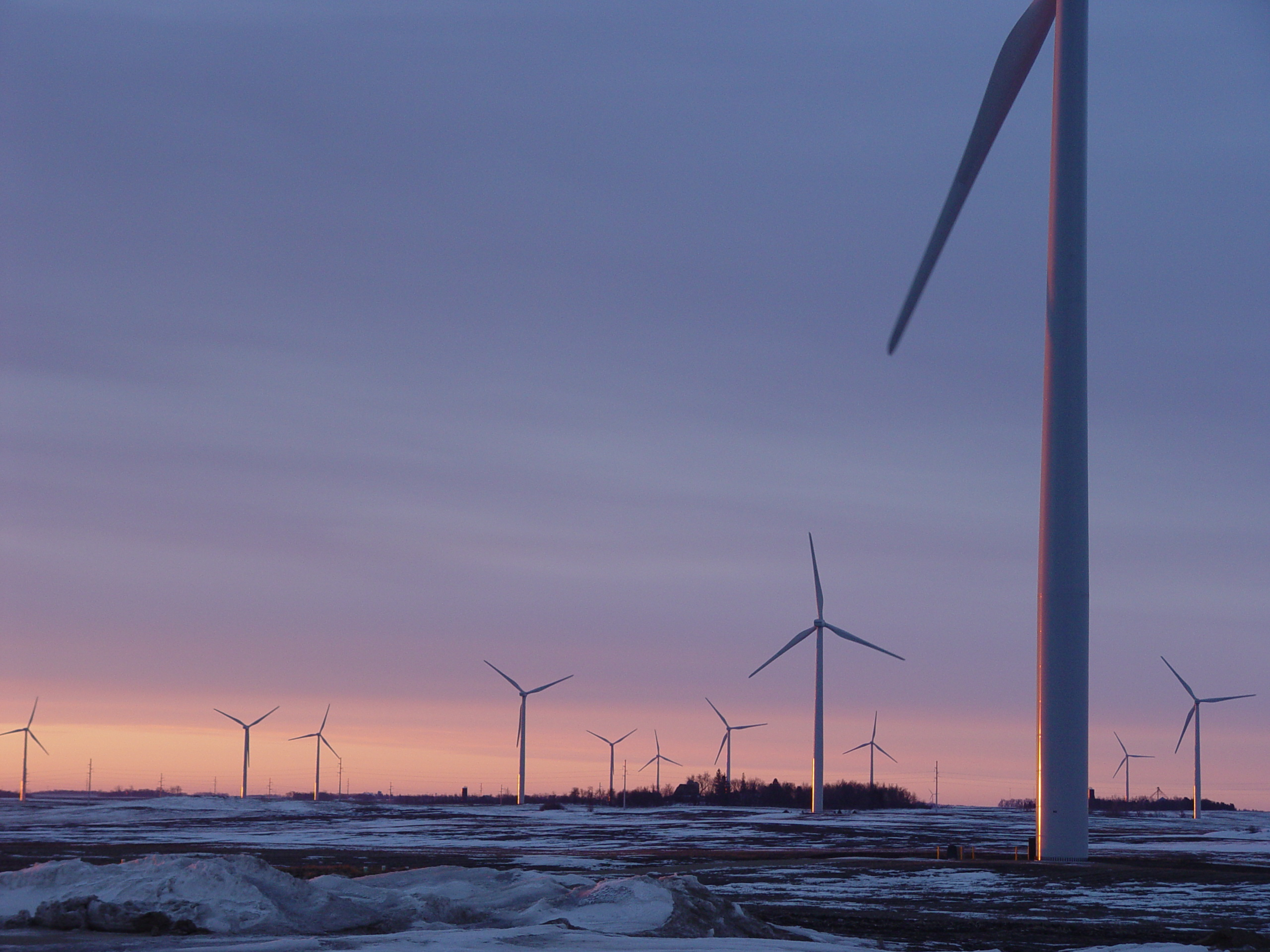
Fenton wind farm at sunrise

The Minnesota Public Utilities Commission issued a permit for the Fenton Wind Farm in April 2006.

In January 2007, the project developer secured financing.

Construction began in September 2007 and the project was completed in October 2007.

== See also ==
- Wind farm
- Wind power in the United States
