= Peetz Table Wind Energy Center =

Peetz Table Wind Complex
- Country: United States
- Location: Logan County, Colorado
- Coordinates: 40°57′03″N 103°09′19″W
- Status: Operational
- Commission date: 2001, 2007
- Owners: NextEra Energy Resources; ArcLight Capital Partners

Wind farm
- Type: Onshore

Power generation
- Units operational: 300 turbines
- Make and model: NEG Micon NM52 0.9 MW / GE SLE 1.5 MW
- Nameplate capacity: 430.2 MW
- Capacity factor: 33.1% (average 2008-2021)
- Annual net output: 1,249 GW·h

The Peetz Table Wind Complex is a 430.2 megawatt (MW) wind facility in Logan County west of the town of Peetz in northeastern Colorado. The first 29.7 MW phase of construction called Peetz Table Wind, also known as Ridge Crest Wind, became the largest wind farm in the state upon its completion in 2001. A second 400.5 MW construction phase, including the 201 MW Logan Wind Energy Center and the 199.5 MW Peetz Table Wind Energy Center, reclaimed the distinction upon its completion in 2007.

== Facility details ==
The Peetz Table is a plateau which provides access along its southern edge in Colorado to some of the best wind resources on the High Plains, according to data from the United States Department of Energy.

The first phase was developed by the European firm EDF Energy in 2001. It occupies farmland about two miles southwest of the small town of Peetz. It consists of 33 NEG Micon NM52/900 wind turbines that are each rated at 0.9 MW. At a total capacity of 29.7 MW, it was the largest wind farm in the state, surpassing the 25.3 MW Ponnequin Wind Farm which had been previously built up starting in the late 1990s.

NextEra Energy Resources developed and constructed the second phase in 2007 as one of the largest wind projects in the United States. The twin 200 MW units occupy the remainder of the plateau to the west of Peetz and south of the Nebraska border. It consists of 267 GE Energy 1.5SLE turbines rated at 1.5 MW.

In 2007, it was projected that the facility would have approximately 20 full-time employees when completed.

== Electricity production ==
Peetz Table Wind Energy Center Generation (MW·h)
Year	Peetz Table Ridge Crest (29.7 MW)	Logan Wind Energy Center (201 MW)	Peetz Table Wind Energy Center (199.5 MW)	Total Annual MW·h
2001	9,876*	-	-	9,876
2002	79,019	-	-	79,019
2003	77,109	-	-	77,109
2004	78,301	-	-	78,301
2005	76,244	-	-	76,244
2006	82,464	-	-	82,464
2007	76,890	132,286*	220,714*	429,890
2008	82,360	646,366	694,061	1,422,787
2009	73,706	612,446	640,107	1,326,259
2010	72,974	582,146	618,408	1,273,528
2011	78,715	626,928	656,697	1,362,340
2012	74,794	600,783	648,557	1,324,134
2013	77,923	613,444	667,118	1,358,485
2014	76,354	592,088	618,722	1,287,164
2015	64,652	510,876	545,244	1,120,772
2016	79,739	592,579	616,321	1,288,639
2017	71,153	575,625	603,917	1,250,695
2018	67,749	493,865	548,243	1,109,857
2019	64,623	416,874	508,415	989,912
2020	71,721	557,388	672,737	1,301,846
2021	60,859	388,141	623,653	1,072,653
Average Annual Production (years 2008-2021) --->				1,249,143
Average Capacity Factor (years 2008-2021) --->				33.1%

(*) partial year of operation

== See also ==
- Wind power in the United States
- Wind power in Colorado
- List of onshore wind farms
