= Stateline Wind Farm =

Wind farm in the United States

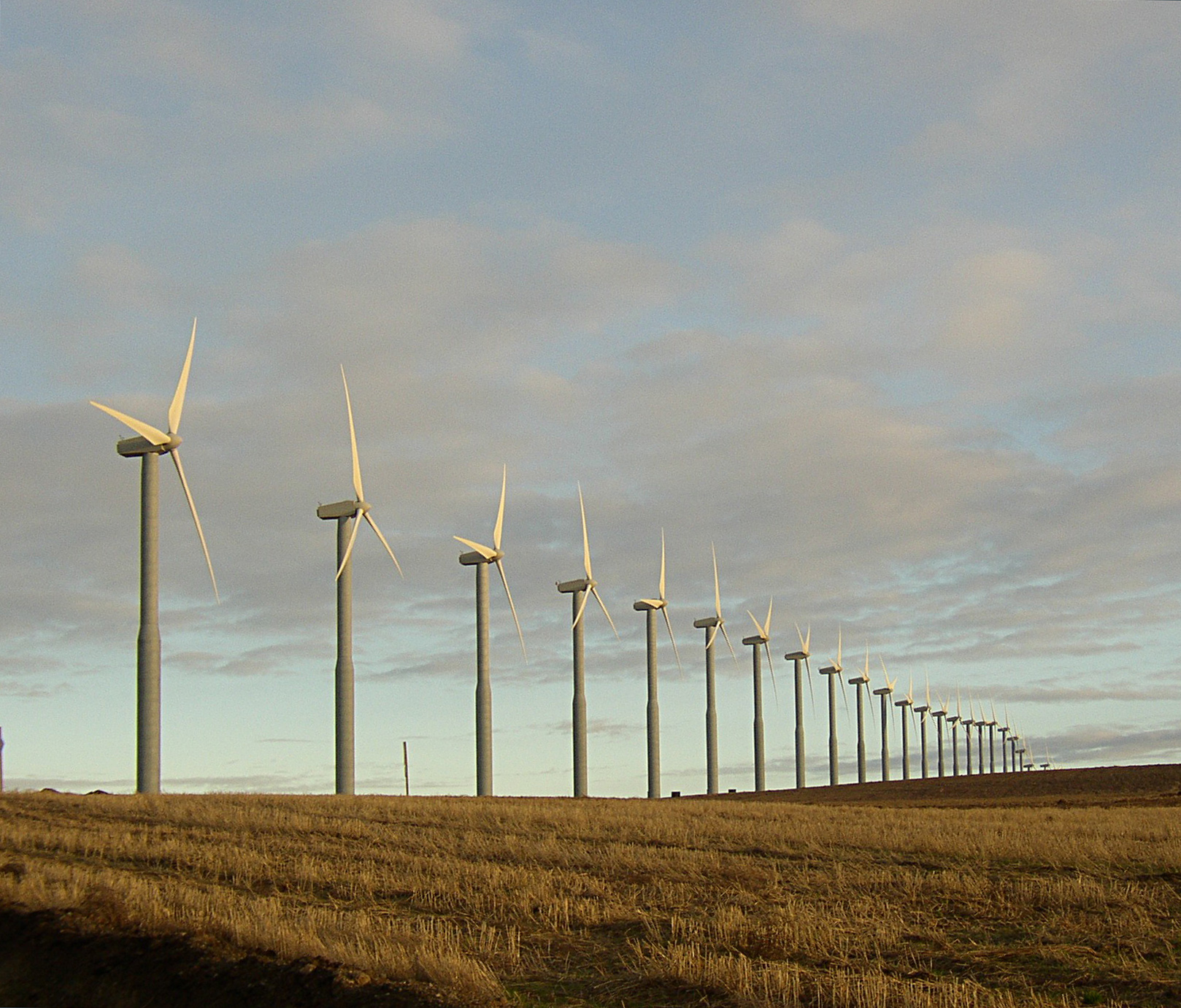
- Turbines near the Walla Walla River
- Country: United States
- Location: Vansycle Ridge, Umatilla County, Oregon, and Walla Walla County, Washington
- Coordinates: 46°02′13.98″N 118°48′23.74″W
- Status: Operational
- Construction began: 2001
- Commission date: 2001 (Stateline 1); 2002 (Stateline 2); 2009 (Stateline 3)
- Owner: Florida Power & Light

Wind farm
- Hub height: 164 and 207 feet (50 and 63 m)

Power generation
- Units operational: 456 x 660 kW
- Make and model: Vestas Wind Systems
- Nameplate capacity: 222 MW; 307 MW (Planned)

The Stateline Wind Farm is a wind farm located on Vansycle Ridge, which receives 16 to 18 mph (26 – 29 km/h) average wind speeds from the Columbia Gorge, on the border between Washington and Oregon in the United States. With 454 turbines, it is the largest wind project in the Northwestern United States. Costing $300 million to build, it began operation in 2001.

The project employs 660 kW capacity Vestas wind turbines, which collectively will produce a maximum electrical output of 306.9 MW. On average, the project is expected to produce 30 to 35 percent of that capacity year-round. Turbines are controlled individually by electronic systems which direct them into the wind and adjust the pitch of the blades to maximize electrical production at any wind speed from 7 to 56 mph (11.3 to 90 km/h). The turbines automatically shut down at wind speeds excess of 56 mph (90 km/h), a feature which allows them to withstand hurricane-force winds.

The wind turbines are grouped in strings of 5 to 37 turbines, each turbine spaced approximately 250 feet (76 m) from the next, generally slightly downwind of the crest of ridges. Each turbine tower is 166 feet (50 m) tall, with blades 76 feet (23 m) wide.

Environmental impact studies determined that the site was not used extensively by birds or other species vulnerable to injury from turbines, and the turbine towers' construction, along with the use of underground power lines, was designed to minimize perching places for birds. The area around the project is used primarily for private farming, including dryland wheat farming and cattle grazing.

The Stateline Wind Project is several miles northwest of the Vansycle Wind Project in Umatilla County, Oregon. Both are owned and operated by Florida Power & Light, a division of NextEra Energy.

A wind turbine collapsed over the weekend of November 2, 2013 on the Washington side of the Stateline Wind Project.

== Gallery ==
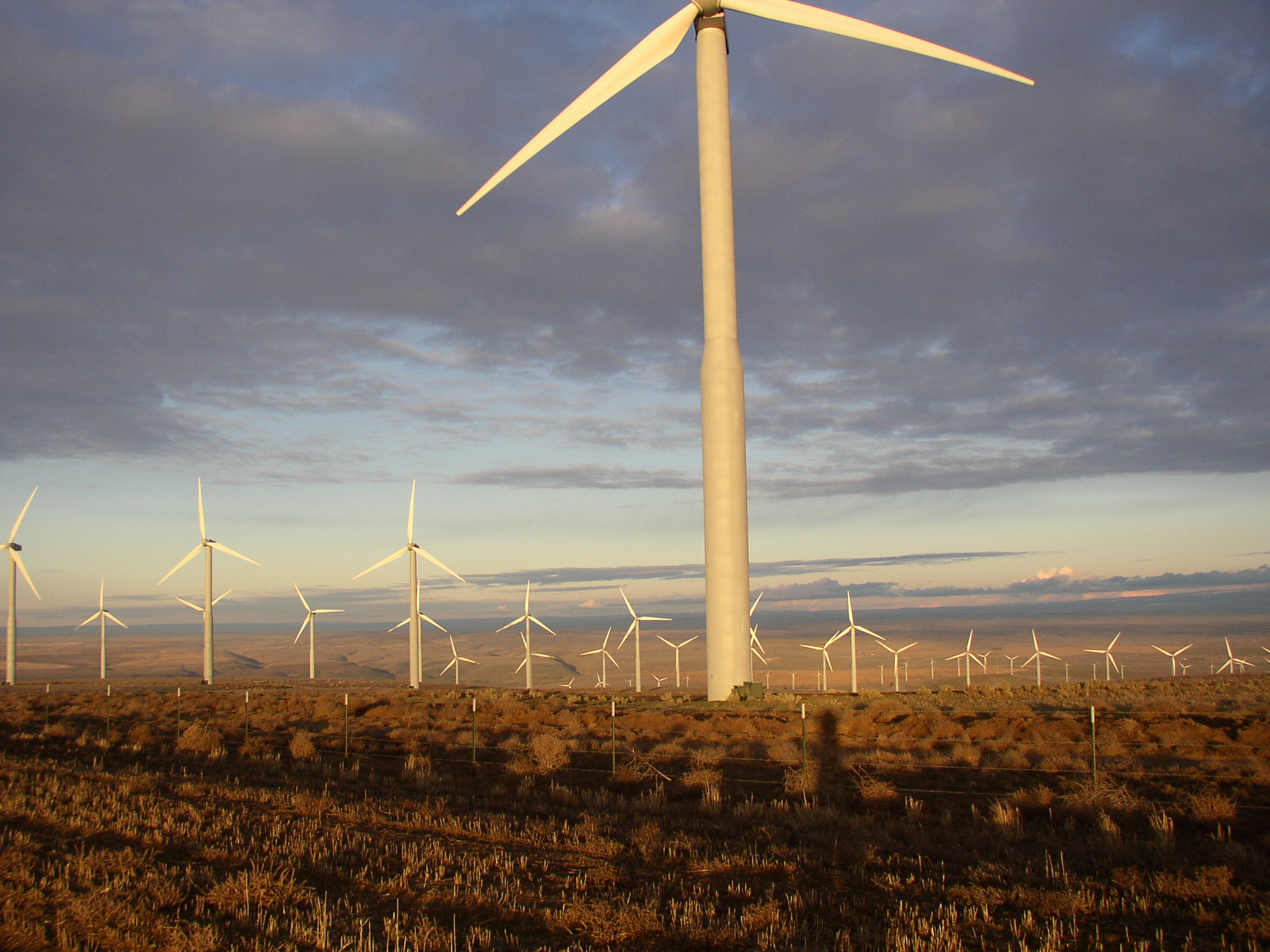

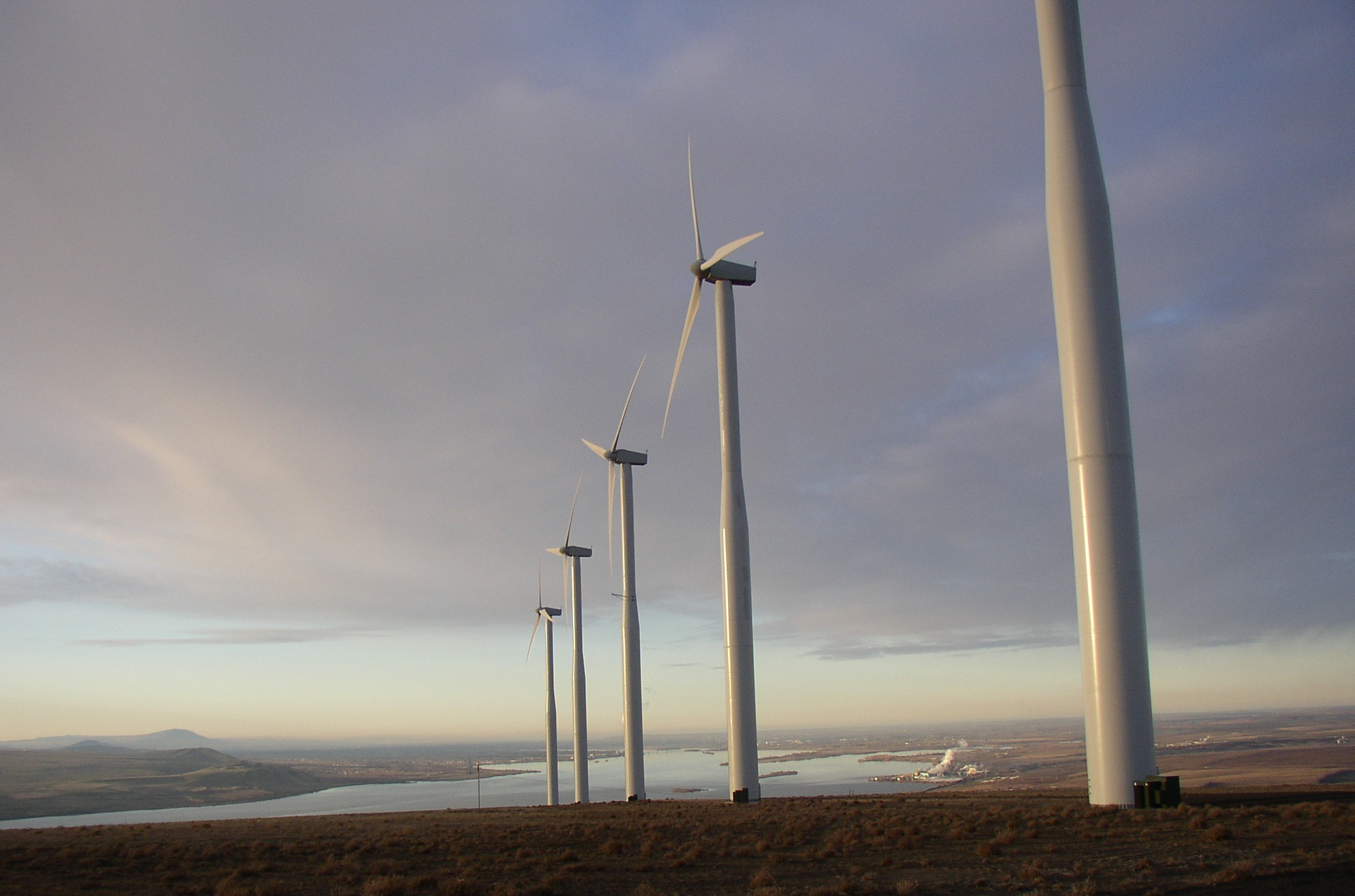

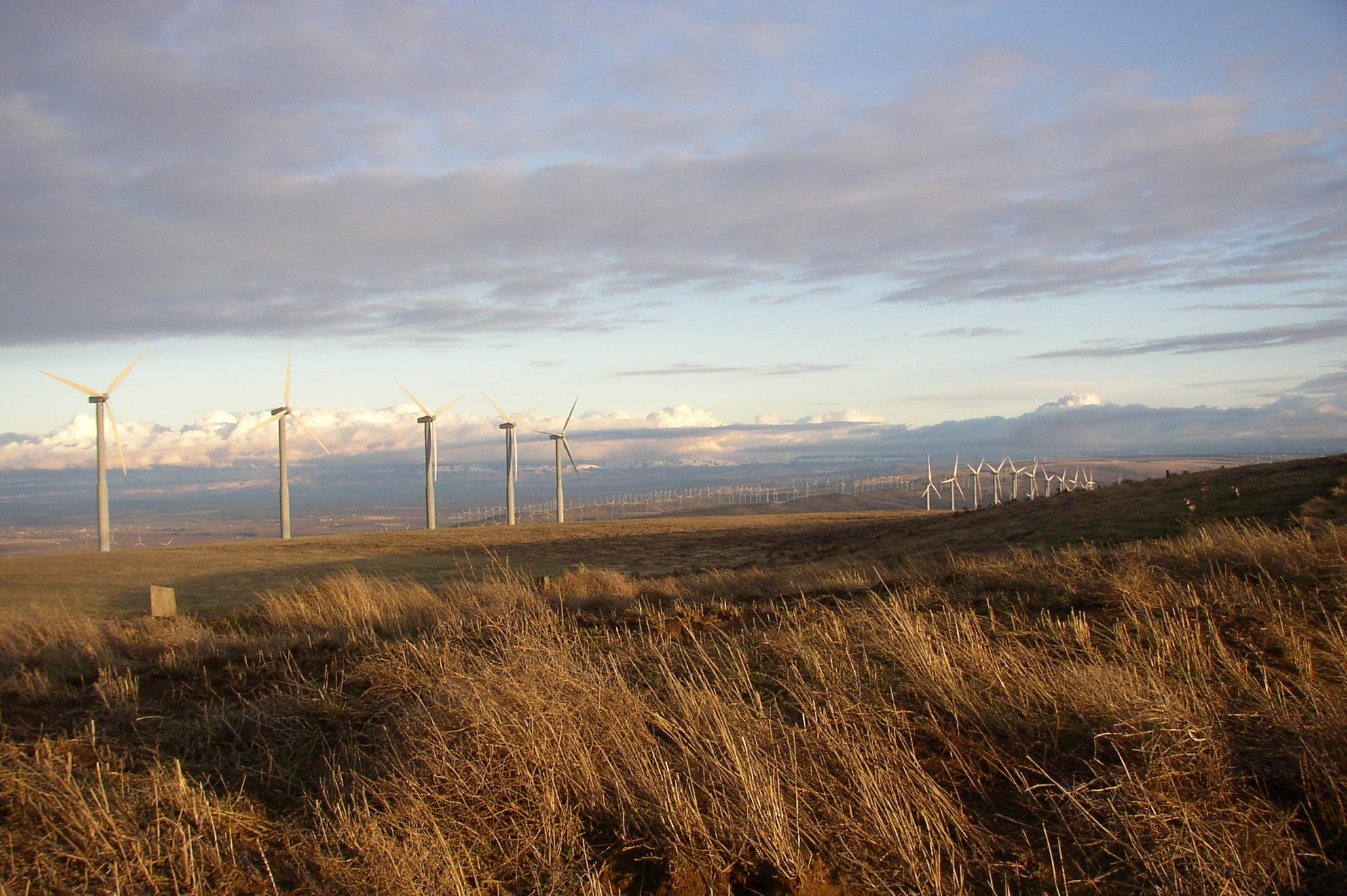

== See also ==
- Wind power in the United States
