= NextEra Energy Resources =

American electricity supplier

NextEra Energy Resources, LLC
- Type: Subsidiary
- Headquarters: Juno Beach, Florida, United States
- Area served: United States, Canada, and Spain
- Products: Electricity
- Revenue: ▲US$ 5.19 billion (2017); US$ 4.89 billion (2016)
- Net income: ▲US$ 2.91 billion (2017); US$ 1.22 billion (2016)
- Total assets: ▲US$ 45.55 billion (2017); US$ 41.74 billion (2016)
- Owner: NextEra Energy, Inc.
- Number of employees: ~5,200 (2017)
- Website: www.nexteraenergyresources.com

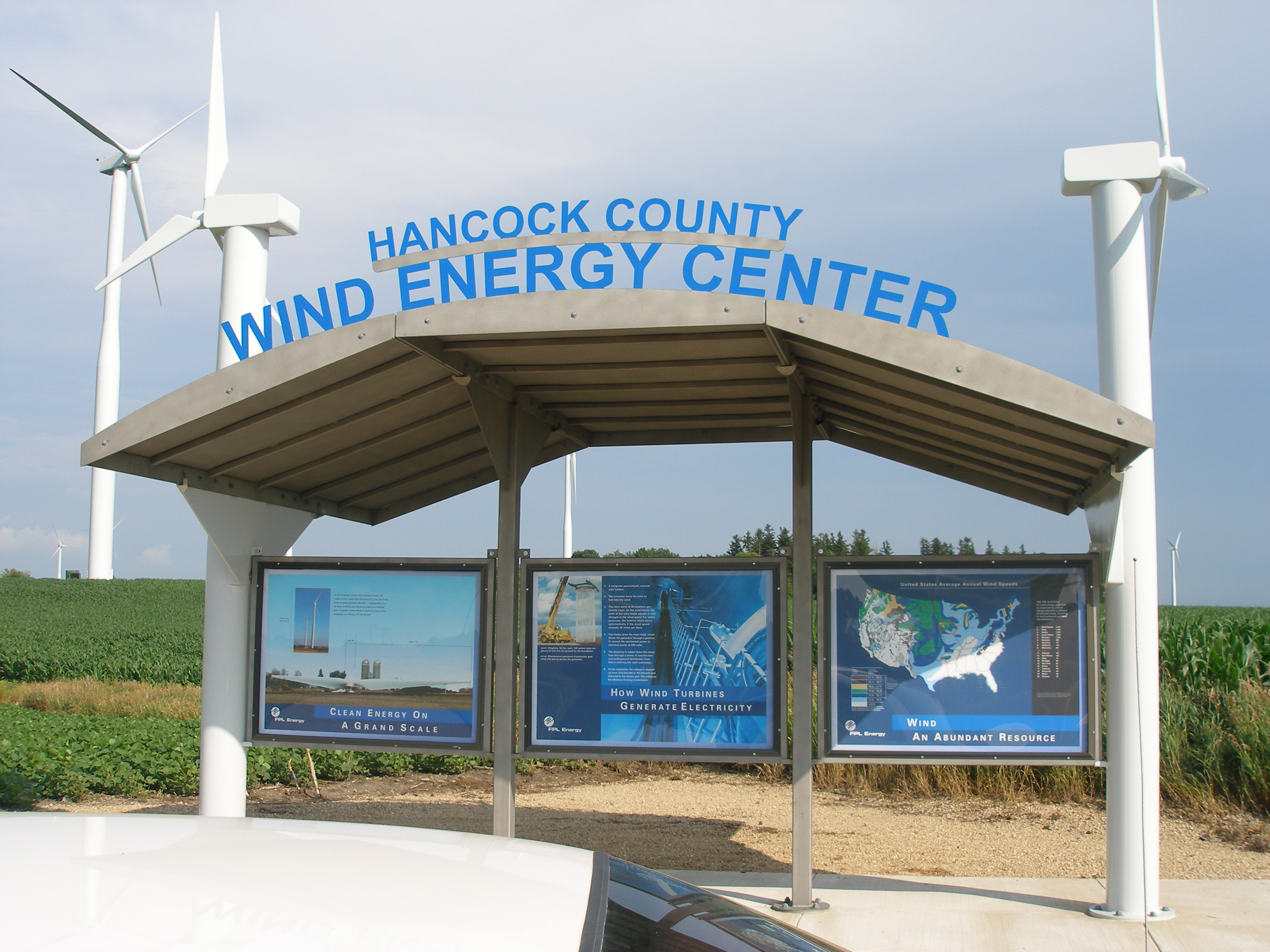
Hancock County Wind Energy Center in Hancock County, Iowa, with 148 Vestas V47-660 kW wind turbines for a total nameplate capacity of 97.68 MW. Half of the wind turbines are southwest of Klemme and the other half are south-southeast of Duncan. NextEra Energy owns the wind farm, which began operating in 2002

NextEra Energy Resources, LLC (NEER) is a wholesale electricity supplier based in Juno Beach, Florida. NEER is a subsidiary of NextEra Energy (NYSE: NEE), a Fortune 200 company. Prior to 2009, NextEra Energy Resources was known as FPL Energy.

NextEra Energy Resources is the world's largest operator of wind and solar projects. In addition to wind and solar, NEER owns and operates generating plants powered by nuclear energy, natural gas, and oil. As of December 2017, the combined capacity of NEER's facilities is 19.06 gigawatts (GW) across 32 states, 4 Canadian provinces, and 1 province in Spain. NEER also develops and builds battery storage projects. As of December 2017, NEER owns and operates approximately 205 electrical substations and 1,190 circuit miles of electric power transmission lines.

== Wind power ==
NextEra Energy Resources has wind facilities located in 21 states in the U.S. and 4 provinces in Canada, primarily located throughout Texas and the Western and Midwestern regions of the U.S. and Canada.

In April 2011, Google Energy signed a power purchase agreement (PPA) with NextEra Energy Resources for 100.8 megawatts of wind energy from Minco II Wind Energy Center in Grady County and Caddo County, Oklahoma.

In December 2017, NextEra Energy Resources acquired all Oklahoma wind power and transmission assets from Clean Line Energy.

In June 2018, AT&T signed a PPA with NextEra Energy Resources for 300 megawatts of wind energy, which was in addition to the PPA signed in February 2018 for 520 megawatts of wind energy from NEER.

As of May 2018, NEER has 113 wind projects in operation producing a net total of 12,863.3 megawatts (MW). Notable wind projects are listed below:

- Capricorn Ridge Wind Energy Center in Sterling County and Coke County, Texas (662.5 MW)
- Crystal Lake Wind Energy Center in Hancock County and Winnebago County, Iowa (416 MW)
- Horse Hollow Wind Energy Center in Taylor County, Texas (735.5 MW)
- New Mexico Wind Energy Center in Quay County and De Baca County, New Mexico (204 MW)
- Peetz Table Wind Energy Center in Logan County, Colorado (199.5 MW)
- Stateline Wind Energy Center in Umatilla County, Oregon and Walla Walla County, Washington (195.1 MW)
- Vansycle Wind Energy Center in Umatilla County, Oregon (124 MW)

== Solar power ==
NextEra Energy Resources has solar facilities located in 16 states in the U.S., 1 province in Canada, and 1 province in Spain.

In December 2010, NextEra Energy Resources purchased four solar projects totaling 40 megawatts in Ontario from First Solar.

In February 2018, NextEra Energy Resources filed a lawsuit against the United States Department of the Treasury for $127 million. The lawsuit involves the construction of Silver State South Solar Energy Center in Clark County, Nevada, which was completed in 2016. The lawsuit claims that "the government has arbitrarily withheld the money it should have paid the company under the Section 1603 grant program to offset the construction costs", and that "the government offered no explanation about why it withheld the money from the company".

In May 2018, the commissioning was held for Arkansas' largest universal solar project, Stuttgart Solar Energy Center (81.0 MW) in Arkansas County, Arkansas, after construction was completed by NEER in partnership with Entergy Arkansas. Pinal Central Solar Energy Center, the largest universal solar project in Arizona, was also opened in Pinal County, Arizona (20 MW) along with a 10-megawatt lithium-ion battery storage system after construction was completed by NEER in partnership with Salt River Project (SRP).

As of May 2018, NEER has 32 universal solar projects and several small scale private generation solar projects in operation, producing a net total of 2,153.7 megawatts (MW). Notable solar projects are listed below:

- Desert Sunlight Solar Farm in Riverside County, California (179.1 MW)
- Genesis Solar Energy Project in Riverside County, California (162.8 MW)
- Solar Energy Generating Systems (SEGS) in Kramer Junction, California (67.5 MW)
- Appleseed Energy Center in Cass County, Indiana (200 MW)

== Nuclear power ==
As of May 2018, NEER has three nuclear power plants in operation, producing a net total of 2,723.3 megawatts (MW), while the other two NextEra Energy nuclear power plants operate under Florida Power & Light. NEER is responsible for all nuclear unit operations and the ultimate decommissioning of the nuclear units, and the nuclear sites use both on-site spent fuel pools and dry cask storage to store spent nuclear fuel generated by the facilities. The NEER nuclear power plants in operation are listed below:

- Duane Arnold Energy Center in Palo, Iowa (430.5 MW) (Note: The power output excludes approximately 184 MW operated by NEER at Duane Arnold Energy Center but owned by non-affiliates.)
- Point Beach Nuclear Plant in Two Rivers, Wisconsin (1,189.8 MW)
- Seabrook Station Nuclear Power Plant in Seabrook, New Hampshire (1,103.0 MW) (Note: The power output excludes approximately 147 MW operated by NEER at Seabrook Nuclear Station but owned by non-affiliates.)

== Natural gas ==
In November 2016, NextEra Energy Resources sold two natural gas plants located in Marcus Hook, Pennsylvania and other assets to Starwood Energy Group. The sale totaled approximately $765 million and included the combined-cycle Marcus Hook Energy Center (790 MW) and the simple-cycle Marcus Hook 50 Energy Center (50 MW).

As of May 2018, NEER has four natural gas plants in operation, all located in the Northeast region of the U.S., producing a net total of 420 megawatts (MW). The natural gas plants in operation are listed below:

- Bayswater Energy Center in Far Rockaway, New York (55 MW)
- Bellingham Energy Center in Bellingham, Massachusetts (152.5 MW)
- Jamaica Bay Station in Far Rockaway, New York (55 MW)
- Sayreville Energy Center in Sayreville, New Jersey (157.5 MW)

== See also ==
- Florida Power & Light
- Gulf Power Company
- List of onshore wind farms
- Wind power in the United States
- NextEra Energy Resources 250 (NASCAR race sponsored by NextEra)
