= Wind power in the United States =

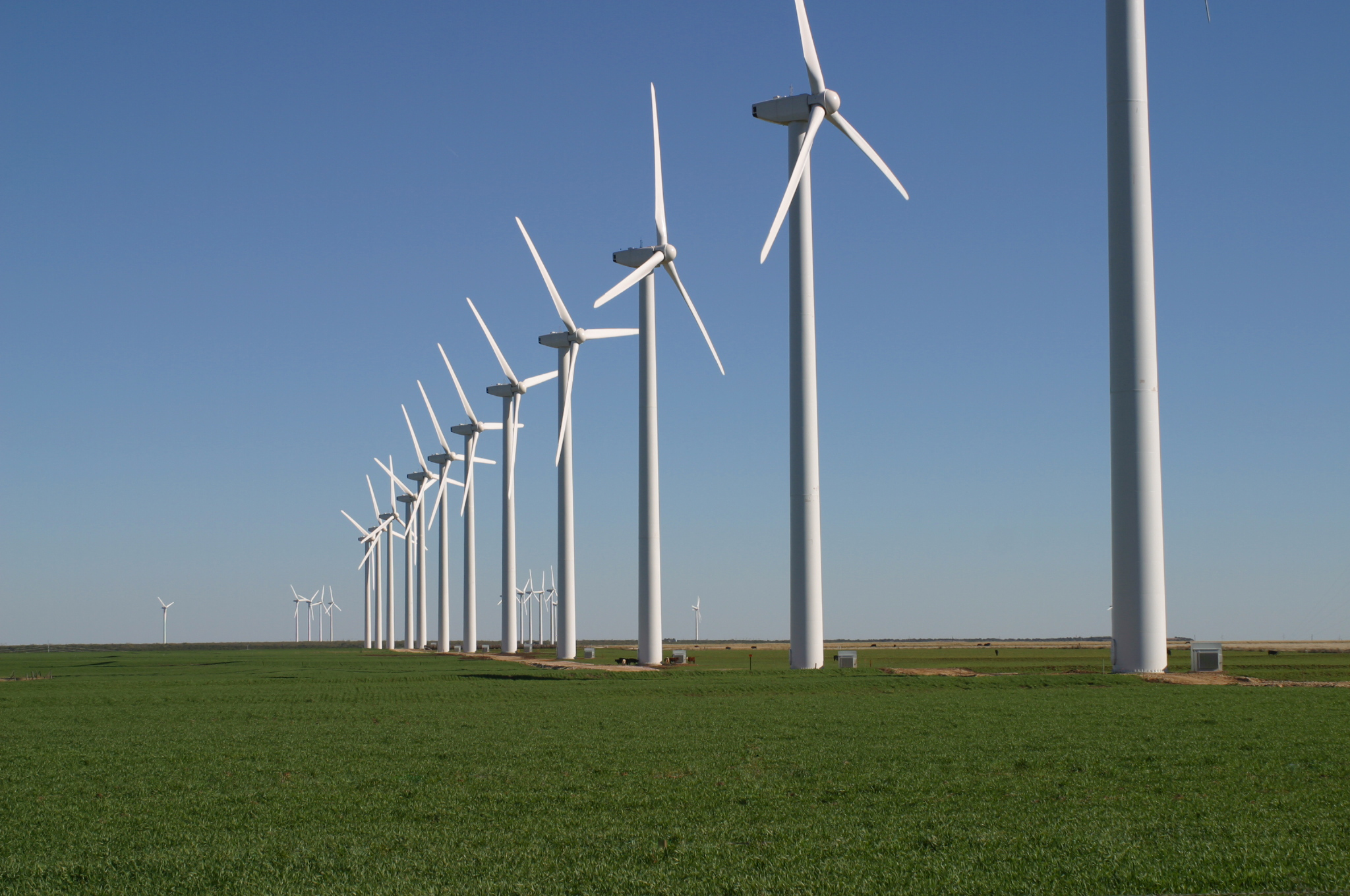
Brazos Wind Farm in Texas

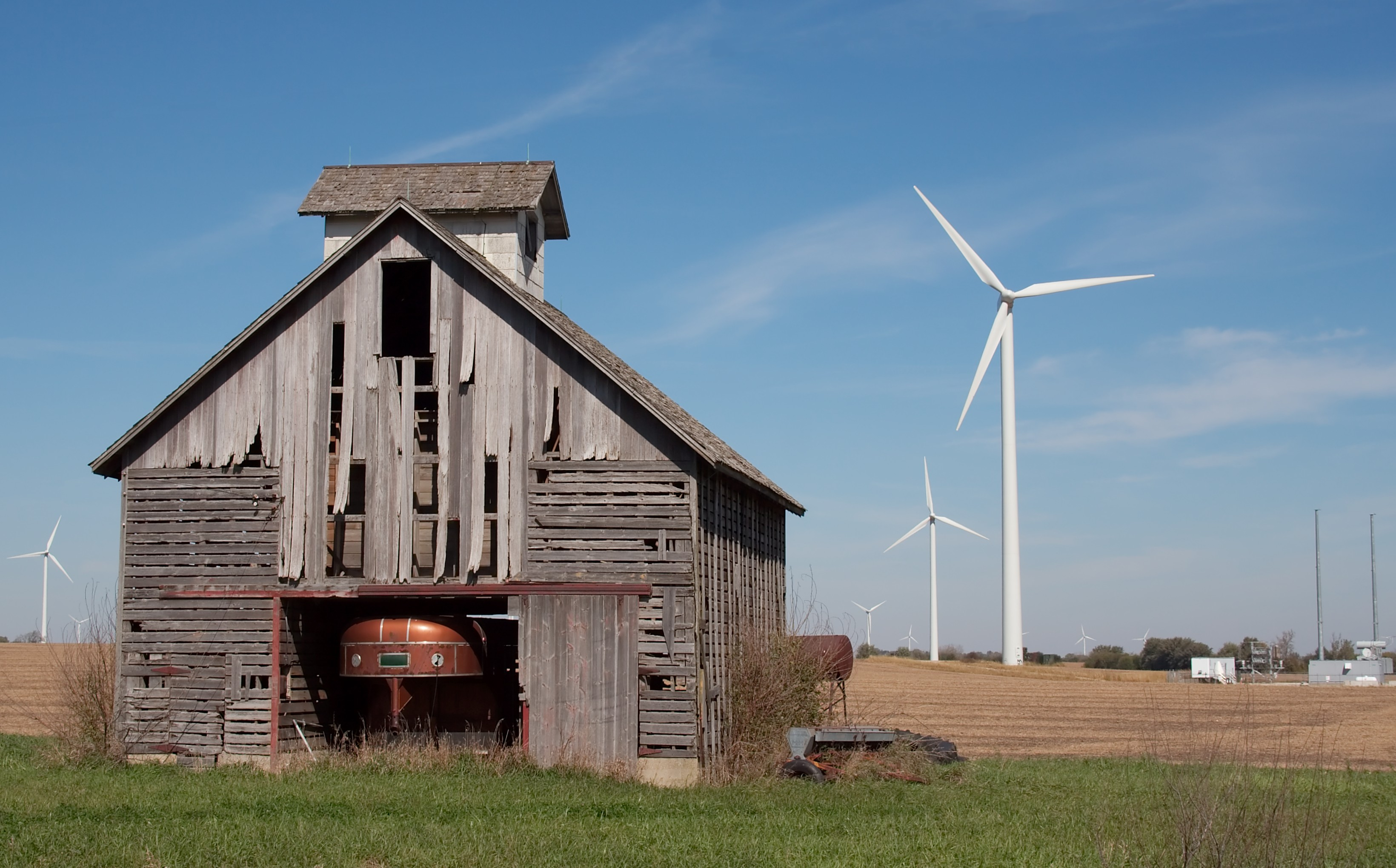
Mendota Hills Wind Farm in northern Illinois

Wind power is a branch of the energy industry that has expanded quickly in the United States over the last several years. In 2025, 461.6 terawatt-hours were generated by wind power, or 10.43% of electricity in the United States. The average wind turbine generates enough electricity in 46 minutes to power the average American home for one month. In 2019, wind power surpassed hydroelectric power as the largest renewable energy source in the U.S. In March and April of 2024, electricity generation from wind exceeded generation from coal, once the dominant source of U.S. electricity, for an extended period for the first time. The federal government and many state governments have policies that guide and support the development of the industry, including tax credits and renewable portfolio standards.

As of December 2023, the total installed wind power nameplate generating capacity in the United States was 147,500 megawatts (MW), up from 141,300 megawatts (MW) in January 2023, although total energy generation declined slightly due to weather conditions. This capacity is exceeded only by China and the European Union. Thus far, wind power's largest growth in capacity was in 2020, when 16,913 MW of wind power was installed. Following behind it were 2021, during which 13,365 MW were installed, and 2012, which saw the addition of 11,895 MW, representing 26.5% of new power capacity installed in 2012.

By September 2019, 19 states had over 1,000 MW of installed capacity with five states, Texas, Iowa, Oklahoma, Kansas, and California, generating over half of all wind energy in the nation. Texas, with 39,450 MW of capacity generating about 25% of the state's total electricity in 2024, has had the most installed wind power capacity of any U.S. state for more than a decade. The state generating the highest percentage of energy from wind power is Iowa, at over 57% of total energy production. North Dakota currently has the most per capita wind generation.

The Alta Wind Energy Center in California is currently the largest completed wind farm in the United States with a capacity of 1,548 MW. When completed in 2026, SunZia Wind in Central New Mexico, will be the largest wind farm in the western hemisphere, with over 900 turbines and a generating capacity of 3,500 MW. GE Power is the largest domestic wind turbine manufacturer.

Many projects to develop wind farms have been held up by new regulations and a slowed federal permitting process by the Trump administration, which is encouraging the use of fossil fuels.

== History ==
The first municipal use of multiple wind-electric turbines in the USA may have been a five turbine system in Pettibone, North Dakota in 1940. These were commercial Wincharger units on guyed towers.

In 1980, the world's first wind farm, consisting of twenty 30 kW wind turbines was installed at Crotched Mountain, in New Hampshire.

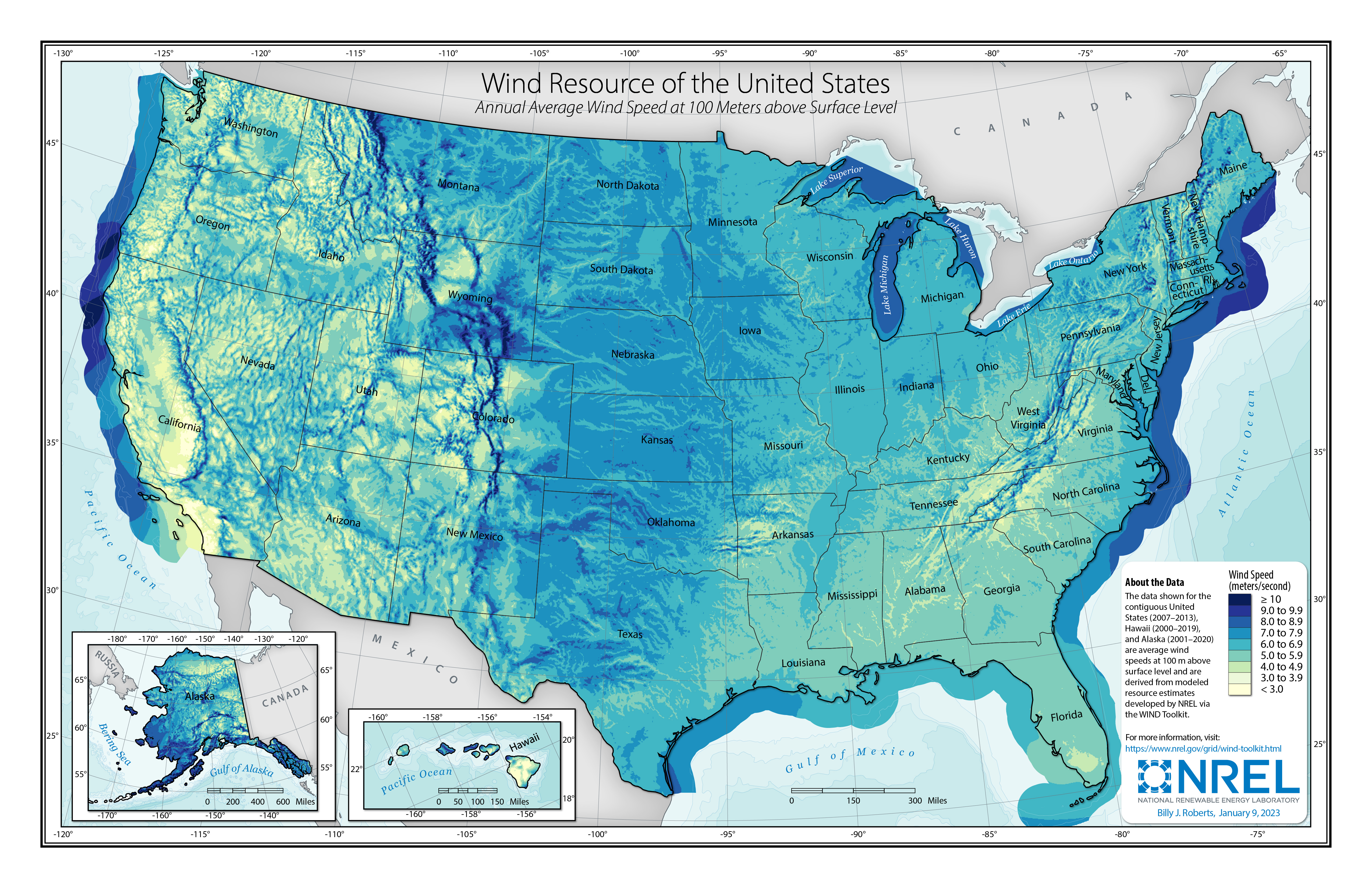
Wind power resource at 100-meters above surface level

From 1974 to the mid-1980s, the United States government worked with industry to advance the technology and enable large commercial wind turbines. A series of NASA wind turbines were developed under a program to create a utility-scale wind turbine industry in the U.S., with funding from the National Science Foundation and later the United States Department of Energy (DOE). 13 experimental wind turbines were put into operation, in four major wind turbine designs. This research and development program pioneered many of the multi-megawatt turbine technologies in use today, including: steel tube towers, variable-speed generators, composite blade materials, partial-span pitch control, as well as aerodynamic, structural, and acoustic engineering design capabilities.

In the 1980s, California began providing tax rebates for wind power. These rebates funded the first major use of wind power for utility electric power. These machines, gathered in large wind parks such as at Altamont Pass, would be considered small and un-economic by modern wind power development standards. In 1985, half of the world's wind energy was generated at Altamont Pass. By the end of 1986, about 6,700 wind turbines, mostly less than 100 kW, had been installed at Altamont, at a cost of about $1 billion, and generated about 550 GWh/year.

== Largest wind farms ==
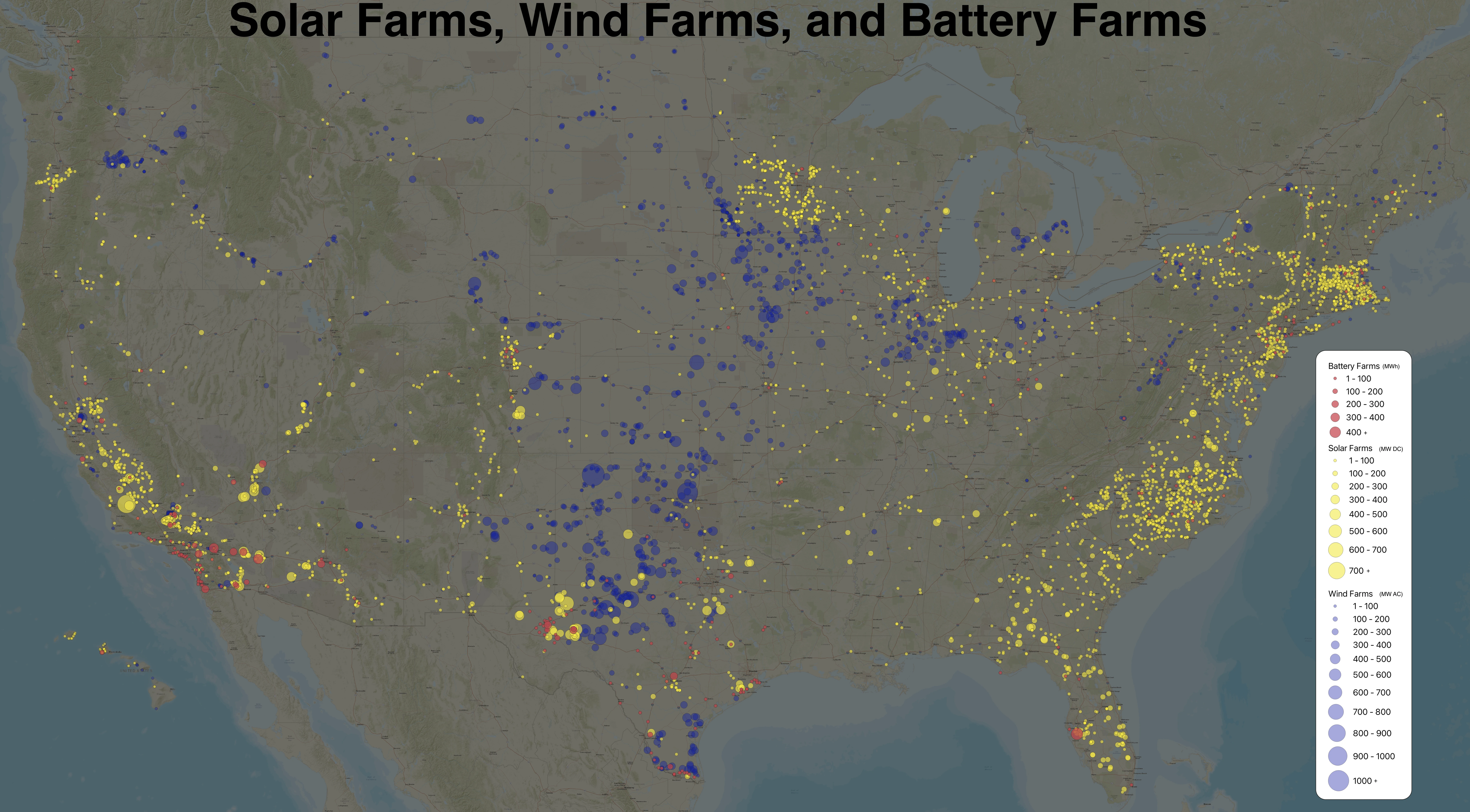
Wind farms, solar farms, and battery farms in the United States

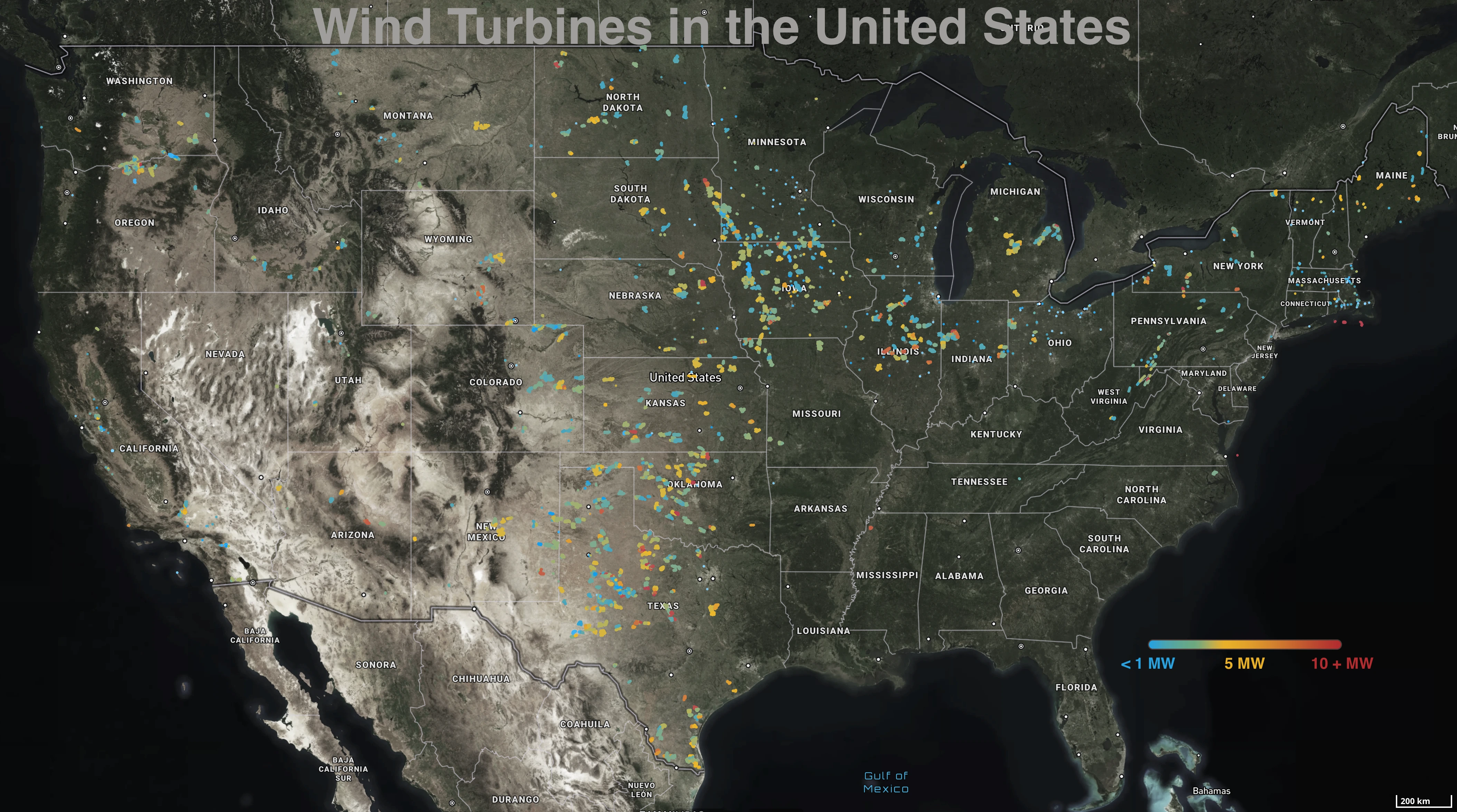
Wind power in the United States

The nine largest wind farms in the United States are:

Project	Capacity (MW)	State
SunZia Wind and Transmission	3500^{(2026)}	New Mexico
Alta Wind Energy Center	1548	California
Western Spirit Wind Farm	1050	New Mexico
Traverse Wind Energy Center	998	Oklahoma
Los Vientos Wind Farm	912	Texas
Shepherds Flat Wind Farm	845	Oregon
Meadow Lake Wind Farm	801	Indiana
Roscoe Wind Farm	781	Texas
Javelina Wind Energy Center	749	Texas
Horse Hollow Wind Energy Center	736	Texas

== Economics ==
In version 16.0 of the levelized cost of energy (LCOE) report published in April 2023, Lazard reports an LCOE for onshore wind between $24 and $75 per megawatt-hour (MWh) and the range for offshore between $72 and $140 per MWh. The lower end of the range ($24/MWh) is, along with utility-scale solar photovoltaic (PV), the lowest unsubsidized LCOE. Conventional power plants range from $39/MWh for the low end of Gas Combined Cycle up to $221/MWh for the upper end of Gas Peaking and Nuclear power plants. The average LCOE for onshore wind increased from $36/MWh in 2021 to $50/MWh in 2023. Such increases were seen across the energy sector.

In 2021, the United States Energy Information Administration estimated that the unsubsidized, levelized cost of new onshore wind energy entering service in 2023 will be 3 cents per kwh ($30/MWh). The report also cautioned that levelized costs can be misleading. While levelized cost reflects the cost of building and operating a power plant, it does not recognize the relative value of energy from dispatchable sources such as gas turbine compared to non-dispatchable sources such as wind farms. The report also calculates levelized avoided cost of energy (LACE), which can be used to better reflect the economic value of an energy source.

Subsidies such as the investment tax credit and production tax credit further reduce the cost of wind energy. These subsidies are scheduled to decline and expire in the coming years.

Renewable portfolio standards require renewable energy to exist, most of it intermittent, such as wind and solar, but at the expense of utilities and consumers. Subsidizing this with production tax credits makes wind power cheaper for utilities and consumers, but at the expense of taxpayers.

== National trends ==
=== Production ===
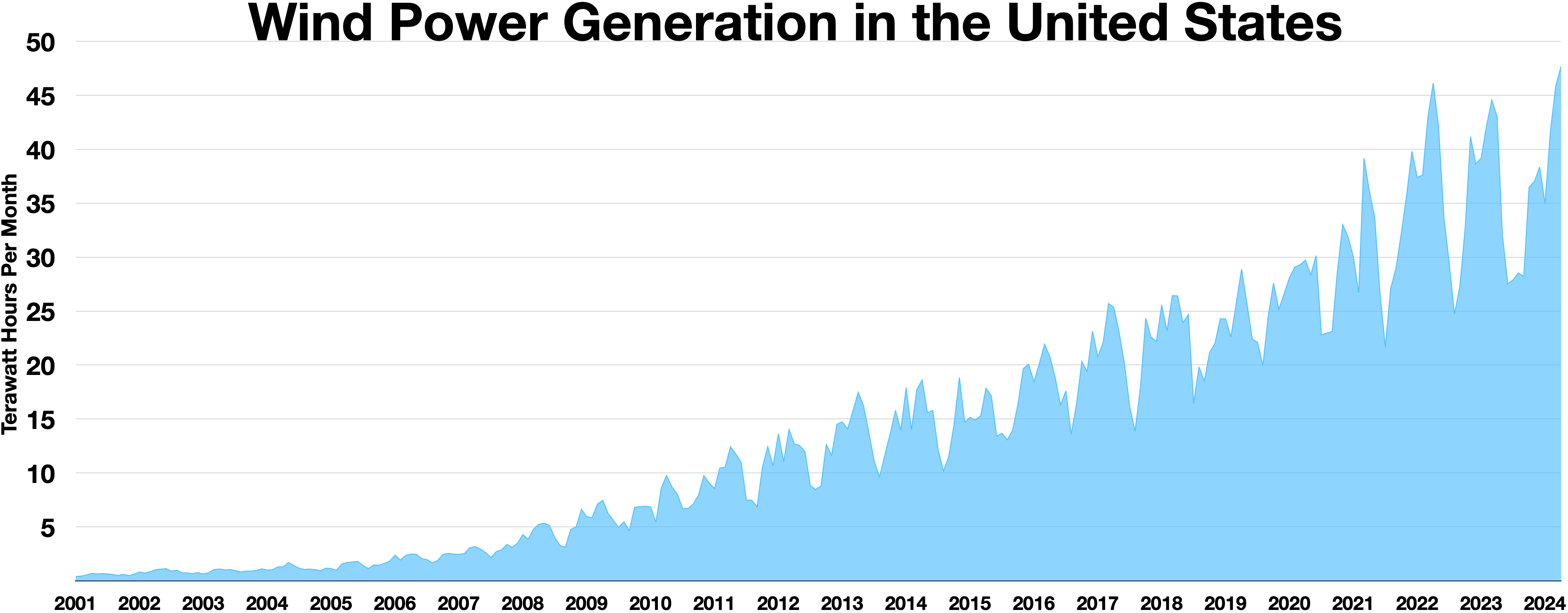
Wind power generation 2001-2024

Average monthly capacity factors for electric power generation by utility-scale wind turbines in the United States, 2011–2015 (US Energy Information Administration data)

Wind generation by year in the United States	Wind generation capacity by year in the United States
Power from wind generated annually since 2000 (GWh)	Installed wind power generating capacity since 1999 (MW)

As of 2022, the United States has over 141 GW of installed wind power capacity.

In 2010, newly installed generating capacity was about half of the previous year due to various factors, including the 2008 financial crisis, and the Great Recession.

In 2013, there was a 92% reduction in newly installed generating capacity compared to 2012, due to the late extension of the PTC (see image on the right). The graph at left shows the growth in installed wind generation capacity in the United States based on data from the Office of Energy Efficiency and Renewable Energy. In 2008, installed capacity in the U.S. increased by 50% over the prior year. The world average growth rate that year was 28.8%.

By 2014, the wind industry in the USA was able to produce more power at lower cost by using taller wind turbines with longer blades, capturing the faster winds at higher elevations. This opened up new opportunities and in Indiana, Michigan, and Ohio, the price of power from wind turbines 300 to 400 feet (90 to 120 m) above the ground competed with conventional fossil fuels like coal. Prices had fallen to about 4 cents per kilowatt-hour in some cases and utilities had been increasing the amount of wind energy in their portfolio, saying it is their cheapest option. For power contracts made in the year 2014, the average price of wind power fell to 2.5¢/kWh.

The capacity factor is the ratio of power actually produced divided by the nameplate capacity of the turbines. The overall average capacity factor for wind generation in the US increased from 31.7% in 2008, to 32.3% in 2013.

In 2023, U.S. wind power production fell by 2% despite an increase of 6.2 gigawatts in capacity, primarily due to weaker-than-normal winds in the Midwest. This marked the first decrease in 25 years and was reflected in the capacity factor dropping to an eight-year low of 33.5%. The decline highlights the challenges of depending on intermittent renewable energy sources like wind, which are significantly influenced by variable climatic conditions such as the El Niño phenomenon, reducing wind speeds.

=== Wind generation potential ===
New installation of wind and solar capacity increased surged in 2020, but was then affected by sourcing problems for solar panels, supply chain constraints, interconnection issues, and policy uncertainty.

According to the National Renewable Energy Laboratory, the contiguous United States has the potential for 10,459 GW of onshore wind power. The capacity could generate 37 petawatt-hours (PW·h) annually, an amount nine times larger than total U.S. electricity consumption. The U.S. also has large wind resources in Alaska, and Hawaii.

In addition to the large onshore wind resources, the U.S. has large offshore wind power potential, with another NREL report released in September 2010 showing that the U.S. has 4,150 GW of potential offshore wind power nameplate capacity, an amount 4 times that of the country's 2008 installed capacity from all sources, of 1,010 GW. Some experts estimate that the entire East Coast could be powered by offshore wind farms.

The U.S. Department of Energy's 2008 report 20% Wind Energy by 2030 envisioned that wind power could supply 20% of all U.S. electric power, which included a contribution of 4% to the nation's total electric power from offshore wind power. In order to achieve this, significant advances in cost, performance and reliability are needed, based on a 2011 report from a coalition of researchers from universities, industry, and government, supported by the Atkinson Center for a Sustainable Future. Obtaining 20% from wind requires about 305 GW of wind turbines, an increase of 16 GW/year after 2018, or an average increase of 14.6%/year, and transmission line improvements. Analysts estimate around 25 GW of added US wind power in 2016–18, depending on the Clean Power Plan and PTC extensions. After the PTC phase-out in 2021, additional wind power capacity is expected to be around 5 GW per year.

== Wind power by state ==
Trends of wind electrical generation in the top five states, 1990–2013 (US EIA data)

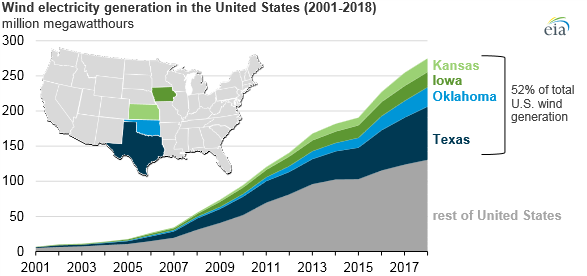
Wind electricity generation in the United States, 2001–2018. In 2018, four states made up over half of total wind power output.

In 2019, electric power generation from wind power was 10 percent or more in fourteen U.S. states: Colorado, Idaho, Iowa, Kansas, Maine, Minnesota, North Dakota, Oklahoma, Oregon, South Dakota, Vermont, Nebraska, New Mexico, and Texas. Iowa, South Dakota, North Dakota, Oklahoma, and Kansas each had more than 20 percent of their electric power generation come from wind. Twenty states now have more than five percent of their generation coming from wind. Iowa became the first state in the nation to generate 50% of its electricity from wind power in 2020, as predicted in 2015.

The five states with the most wind capacity installed at the end of 2020 were:

- Texas (33,133 MW)
- Iowa (11,660 MW)
- Oklahoma (9,048 MW)
- Kansas (7,016 MW)
- Illinois (6,409 MW)

The top five states according to percentage of generation by wind in 2020 were:

- Iowa (57.5%)
- Kansas (43.3%)
- Oklahoma (35.4%)
- South Dakota (32.9%)
- North Dakota (30.8%)

=== Texas ===
Though Texas generates the most wind + solar power of all states, various other states generate more wind + solar power per capita.

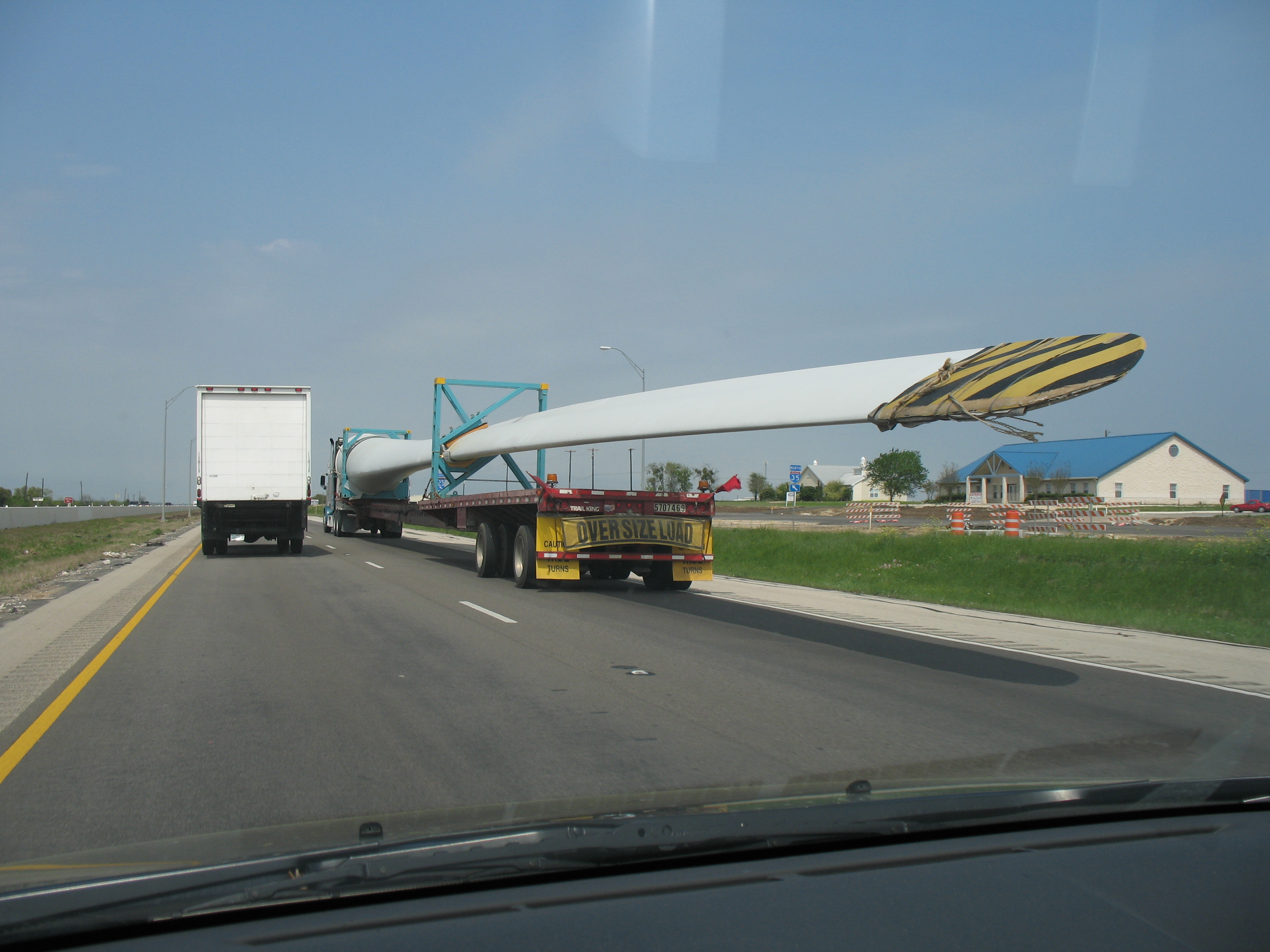
A wind turbine blade on I-35 near Elm Mott, an increasingly common sight in Texas

In July 2008, Texas approved a $4.93 billion expansion of the state's electric grid to bring wind energy to its major cities from western areas of the state. Transmission companies will recoup the cost of constructing the new power lines, expected to be completed in 2013, from fees estimated at $4 per month for residential customers. A lack of transmission capacity forced wind turbines to be shut down at times and reduced wind power generation in Texas by 17% in 2009. In 2011, Texas had become the first state to surpass the 10,000 MW mark.

On completion in 2016, the Los Vientos Wind Farm became Texas's most powerful wind farm with a total installed capacity of 912 MW. It is spread out over two counties in South Texas. It is followed by the Roscoe Wind Farm with 627 wind turbines and a total installed capacity of 781.5 MW which is located about 200 miles (320 km) west of Fort Worth in an area that spans parts of four Texas counties. The Horse Hollow Wind Energy Center is third with 735.5 MW. By 2016 Texas surpassed the 20,000 MW mark by adding over 1800 MW of generating capacity in 2016 alone, including Los Vientos.

Large wind farms in Texas
Wind farm	Installed capacity (MW)	Turbine manufacturer	County
Los Vientos Wind Farm	912	Mitsubishi / Siemens / Vestas	Starr / Willacy
Roscoe Wind Farm	781	Mitsubishi	Nolan
Horse Hollow Wind Energy Center	735	GE Energy / Siemens	Taylor / Nolan
Capricorn Ridge Wind Farm	662	GE Energy / Siemens	Sterling / Coke
Sweetwater Wind Farm	585	GE Energy / Siemens / Mitsubishi	Nolan
Buffalo Gap Wind Farm	523	Vestas	Taylor / Nolan
Panther Creek Wind Farm	458	GE Energy	Howard / ...
Peñascal Wind Farm	404	Mitsubishi	Kenedy
Lone Star Wind Farm	400	Gamesa	Shackelford / Callahan
Papalote Creek Wind Farm	380	Siemens	San Patricio

=== Iowa ===
State wind generation percentages for 2017. Five states exceeded 25% of generation.

More than 57 percent of the electric power generated in Iowa now comes from wind power as of February 2021. Iowa had over 10,950 megawatts (MW) of generation capacity at the end of 2020, with over 1,500 megawatts planned to come online in the near future. Electrical energy generated in Iowa by wind in 2020 amounted to over 34 million Megawatt-hours. Since Iowa adopted a renewable energy standard in 1983, the wind power industry has generated over $19 billion in investment. The second concrete wind turbine tower to be built in the U.S., and also the country's tallest (377 feet) at the time built, is in Adams county. The tower was completed in the spring of 2016.

In 2018, Invenergy announced it plans to develop a pair of wind farms in Iowa. Each farm will be capable of generating 200 MW. Construction is planned to begin in early 2019.

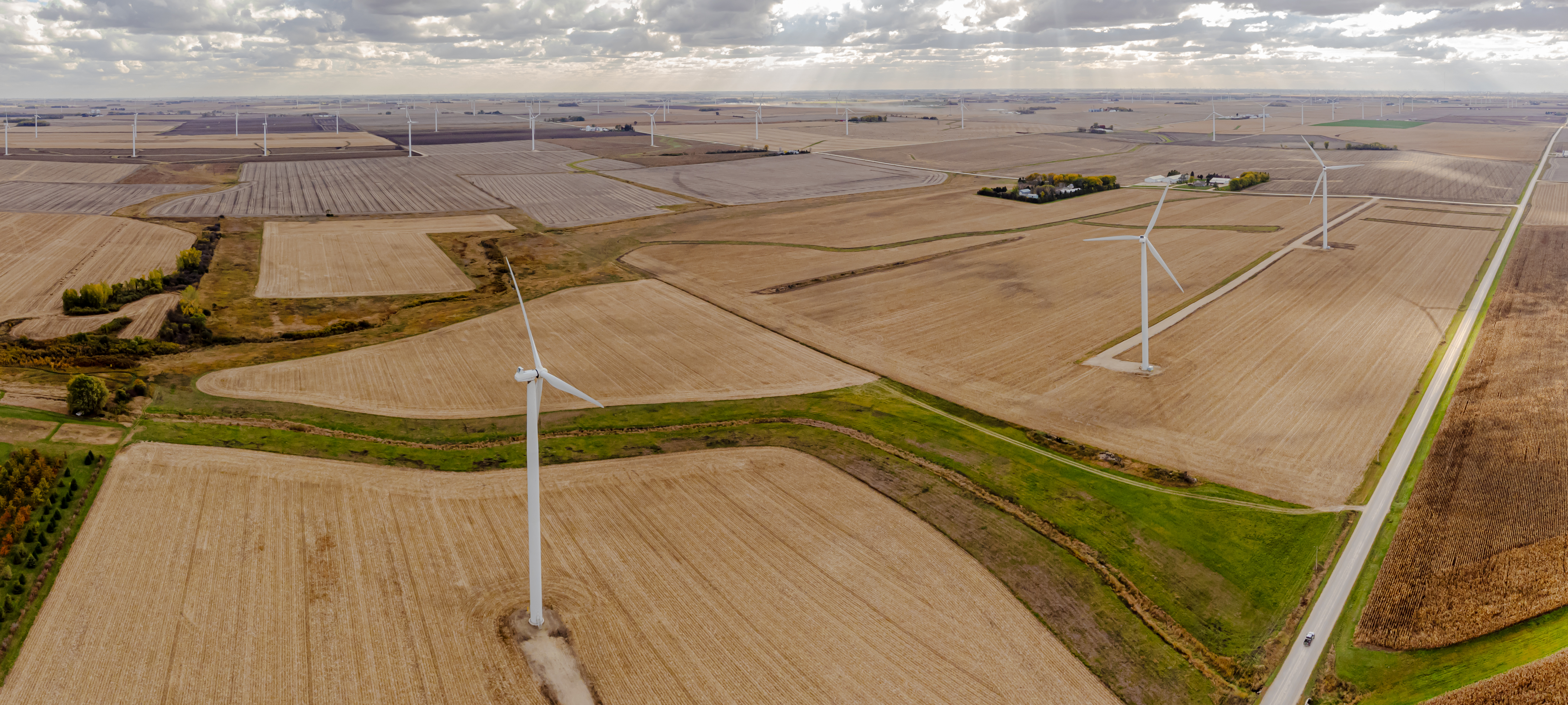
Northern Iowa wind farm in Pioneer Prairie

=== Oklahoma ===
Oklahoma has one of the best resources in the United States. Bergey Windpower, a leading manufacturer of small wind turbines is located in Oklahoma. Programs leading to careers in the wind power industry are provided at tech schools, community colleges and universities in Oklahoma. The Oklahoma Wind Power Initiative supports the development of wind power in the state.

=== Kansas ===
In 2012, Kansas saw a large number of wind projects completed making it among the largest and fastest-growing wind energy markets. At the end of 2014 the total capacity sits at 2,967 MW. Kansas has high potential capacity for wind power, second behind Texas. The most recent estimates are that Kansas has a potential for 950 GW of wind power capacity. Kansas could generate 3,900 TW·h of electric power each year, which represents more than all the electric power generated from coal, natural gas and nuclear combined in the United States in 2011.

=== California ===
With nearly 4,000 megawatts installed, as of the end of 2011, wind energy supplied about 5% of California's total electric power needs, or enough to power more than 400,000 households. The amount varies greatly from day to day. In 2011, 921.3 megawatts were installed. Most of that activity occurred in the Tehachapi area of Kern County, with some big projects in Solano, Contra Costa and Riverside counties as well. After 2014, California ranked second nationwide in terms of capacity, behind Texas with a capacity of 5,917 MW. In 2020, wind power accounted for 7.2% of the combined total energy generated in California.

Large portions of California's wind output, are located in three primary regions: Altamont Pass Wind Farm (east of San Francisco); Tehachapi Pass Wind Farm (south east of Bakersfield), and San Gorgonio Pass Wind Farm, near Palm Springs, east of Los Angeles. The giant new Alta Wind Energy Center, is also located within the Tehachapi Pass region.

Large wind farms in California
Name	Location	Capacity (MW)	Ref
Altamont Pass Wind Farm	Alameda County	576	
Alta Wind Energy Center	Kern County	1548	
San Gorgonio Pass Wind Farm	Riverside County	615	
Tehachapi Pass Wind Farm	Kern County	705	

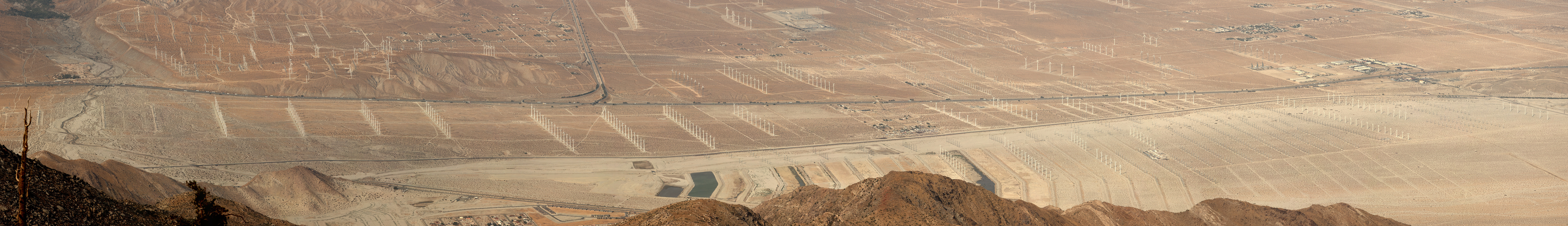
The majority of the San Gorgonio Pass Wind Farm as viewed from the San Jacinto Mountains to the south. The farm continues over the hills to the north along California State Route 62 and is not visible from this vantagepoint. The layout includes a variety of large modern and older smaller turbine designs.

=== Illinois ===
The 2017 average monthly per person wind generation for the top 20 U.S. states is shown. For reference, the average monthly residential electricity use in the U.S. is about 900 kW-hours.

Wind power has been supported by a renewable portfolio standard, passed in 2007, and strengthened in 2009, which requires 10% renewable energy from electric companies by 2010 and 25% by 2025. Illinois has the potential for installing up to an estimated 249,882 MW of wind generation capacity at a hub height of 80 meters.

=== Other states ===
- Wind power in Alabama
- Wind power in Alaska
- Wind power in Arizona
- Wind power in Arkansas
- Wind power in Colorado
- Wind power in Connecticut
- Wind power in Delaware
- Wind power in Florida
- Wind power in Georgia
- Wind power in Hawaii
- Wind power in Idaho
- Wind power in Indiana
- Wind power in Kentucky
- Wind power in Louisiana
- Wind power in Maine
- Wind power in Maryland
- Wind power in Massachusetts
- Wind power in Michigan
- Wind power in Minnesota
- Wind power in Mississippi
- Wind power in Missouri
- Wind power in Montana
- Wind power in Nebraska
- Wind power in Nevada
- Wind power in New Hampshire
- Wind power in New Jersey
- Wind power in New Mexico
- Wind power in New York
- Wind power in North Carolina
- Wind power in North Dakota
- Wind power in Ohio
- Wind power in Oregon
- Wind power in Pennsylvania
- Wind power in Rhode Island
- Wind power in South Carolina
- Wind power in South Dakota
- Wind power in Tennessee
- Wind power in Utah
- Wind power in Vermont
- Wind power in Virginia
- Wind power in Washington
- Wind power in West Virginia
- Wind power in Wisconsin
- Wind power in Wyoming

== Commercialization of wind power ==
Levelized wind power purchase agreement prices by PPA execution date and region, 2015

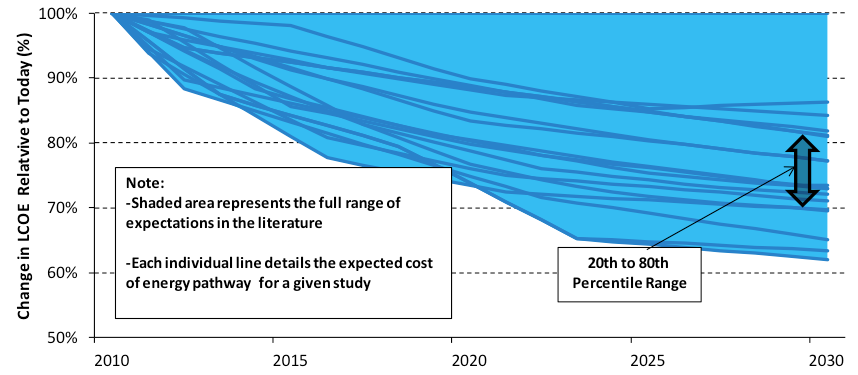
The National Renewable Energy Laboratory projects that the levelized cost of wind power in the U.S. will decline about 25% from 2012 to 2030.

=== Industry trends ===
Since 2005 many turbine manufacturing leaders have opened U.S. facilities. Of the top 10 global manufacturers in 2007, seven – Vestas, GE Energy, Gamesa, Suzlon, Siemens, Acciona, and Nordex – have an American manufacturing presence. REpower is another manufacturer with notable usage in the United States.

Plans for 30 new manufacturing facilities were announced in 2008, and the wind industry expects to see a continued shift towards domestic manufacturing in the coming years. In total, 70 manufacturing facilities have begun production, been expanded, or announced since January 2007.

As of April 2009, over 100 companies are producing components for wind turbines, employing thousands of workers in the manufacture of parts as varied as towers, composite blades, bearings and gears. Many existing companies in traditional manufacturing states have retooled to enter the wind industry. Their manufacturing facilities are spread across 40 states, employing workers from the Southeast to the Steel Belt, to the Great Plains and on to the Pacific Northwest.

The U.S. Department of Energy (DOE) is working with six leading wind turbine manufacturers towards achieving 20% wind power in the United States by 2030. The DOE announced the Memorandum of Understanding (MOU) with GE Energy, Siemens Power Generation, Vestas Wind Systems, Clipper Windpower, Suzlon Energy, and Gamesa Corporation. Under the MOU, the DOE and the six manufacturers will collaborate to gather and exchange information relating to five major areas: research and development related to turbine reliability and operability; siting strategies for wind power facilities; standards development for turbine certification and universal interconnection of wind turbines; manufacturing advances in design, process automation, and fabrication techniques; and workforce development.

In 2014, GE had 60%, Siemens had 26%, and Vestas had 12% of US market share. Combined, they had 98%. Most new turbines were designed for low wind. The turbine manufacturers compete with each other and cause decreasing turbine prices.

=== Other government involvement ===
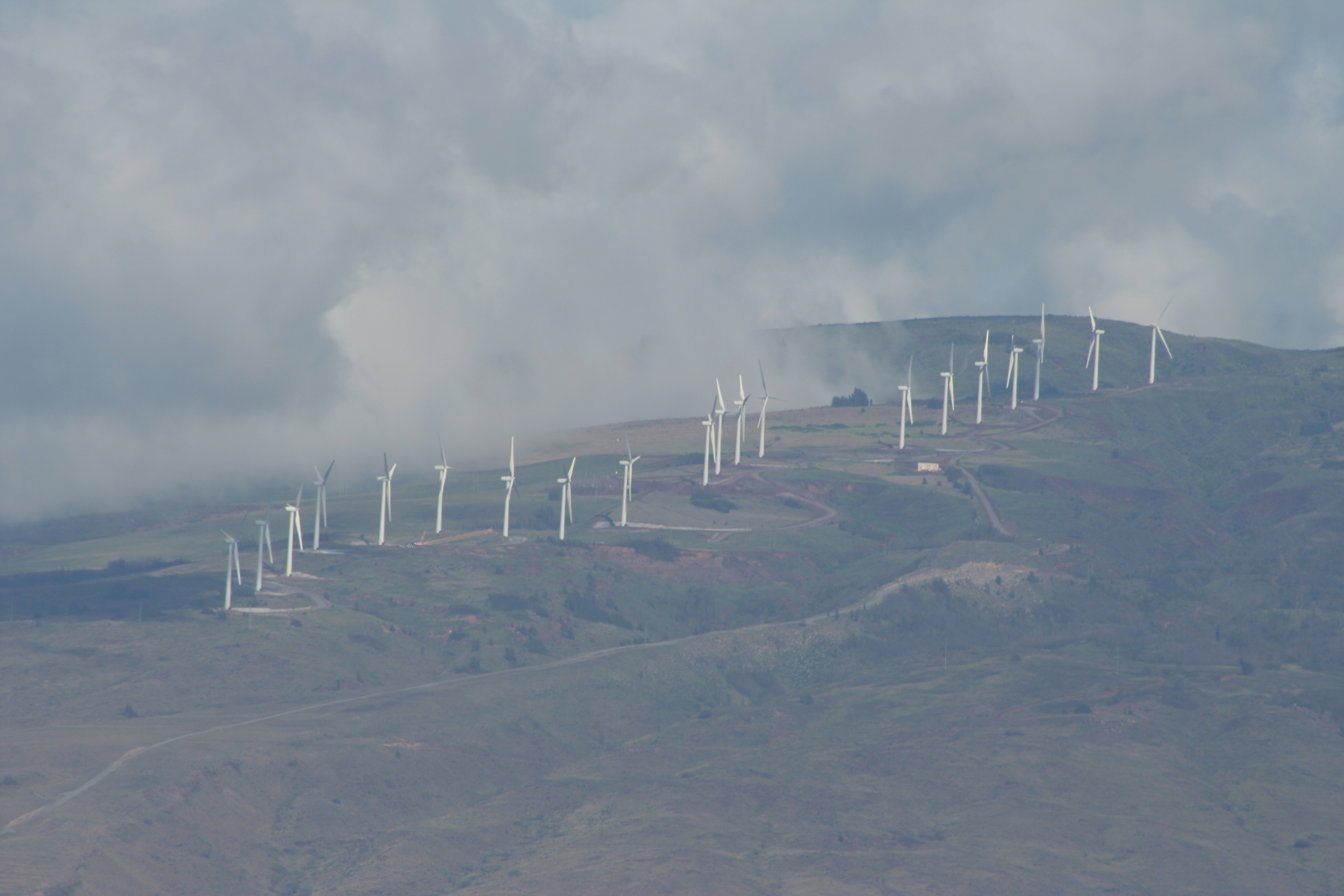
Kaheawa Wind Farm near Maalaea, Maui, with 20 GE Energy 1.5 MW wind turbines

The DOE's National Renewable Energy Laboratory (NREL) has announced a number of wind technology projects, including a new state-of-the-art wind turbine blade test facility to be built in Ingleside, Texas. The Texas-NREL Large Blade Research and Test Facility will be capable of testing blades as long as 70 meters (230 feet). It will be built and operated through a partnership among NREL, DOE, and a state consortium led by University of Houston, with the university owning and operating the facility's buildings, DOE funding up to $2 million in capital costs, and NREL providing technical and operational assistance. The blade test facility is estimated to cost between $12 million and $15 million and should be completed by 2010. Located on the Gulf Coast, the Texas facility will complement a similar facility that is being built on the coast of Massachusetts.

NREL has also recently signed agreements with Siemens Power Generation and First Wind, a wind power developer. Siemens is launching a new research and development facility in nearby Boulder, Colorado, and has agreed to locate and test a commercial-scale wind turbine at NREL's National Wind Technology Center (NWTC). First Wind (formerly called UPC Wind Partners, LLC) owns and operates the 30-megawatt Kaheawa Wind Power farm in West Maui, Hawaii, and has agreed to let the NWTC establish a Remote Research Affiliate Partner Site at the facility. The Maui satellite of NWTC will collaborate with First Wind on studies to develop advanced wind energy technologies, including energy storage and integration of renewable electric power into Maui's electrical grid.

In 2010, the DOE awarded $60 million for a study of transmission requirements. Beginning in 2006, the DOE is required to provide a transmission congestion report once every three years.

Recent U.S. policy has generally been to provide an inflation-adjusted federal production tax credit (PTC) of $15 per MW·h (in 1995 dollars) generated for the first ten years of operation for wind energy sold. As of 2015, the credit was $23 per MW·h. Renewable portfolio standards mandating a certain percentage of electric power sales come from renewable energy sources, which are in place in about half of the states, also have boosted the development of the wind industry.

Each time Congress has allowed the production tax credit to expire, wind power development has slowed as investors wait for the credit to be restored. Each year it is renewed, development has expanded. The tax credit expired at the end of 2012, bringing wind power development activity to a near halt. A short term, one-year policy was enacted at the beginning of 2013 which provides a tax credit to projects under construction by the end of 2013 and completed before the end of 2014. The PTC was first introduced in 1992. When it was allowed to expire, development dropped 93%, 73%, and 77% the following year.

The Energy Information Administration has reported that wind power received the largest share of direct federal subsidies and support in fiscal year 2013 (the latest year for which statistics are available), accounting for 37% ($5.936 billion) of total electric power-related subsidies. Almost three-quarters of wind energy subsidies in that year were direct expenditures and largely resulted from the ARRA programs. These figures do not include subsidies and supports from other levels of government.

The development of wind power in the United States has been supported primarily through a production tax credit (PTC), which pays producers on the amount of electric power produced. On January 1, 2013, the production tax credit was extended for another year.

In late 2015 authorities provided an extension of the Production Tax Credit. The extension phases out the credit over a period of five years. The 30 percent wind and solar tax credit will extend through 2019 and then taper to 10 percent in 2022.

The average price of Power purchase agreements was $23.5/MWh in 2014. Operating expenses were estimated to $10/MWh.

=== Siting considerations ===
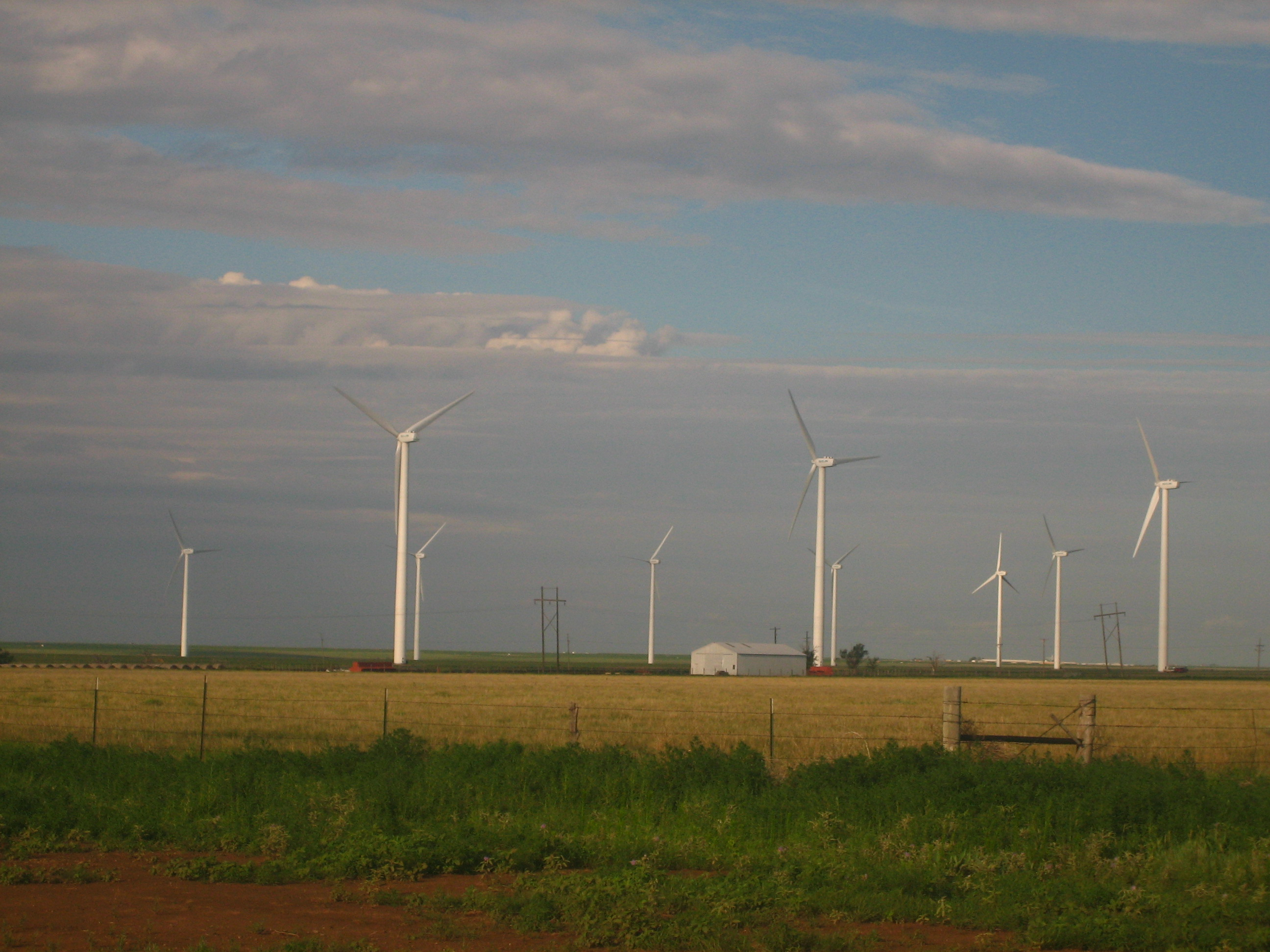
In 2008, landowners typically received $3,000 to $5,000 per year in rental income from each wind turbine, while farmers continue to grow crops or graze cattle up to the foot of the turbines.

There is competition for wind farms among farmers in places like Iowa or ranchers in Colorado. In 2007, farmers, with no investment on their part, typically received $3,000–5,000 per year in royalties from the local utility for siting a single, large, advanced-design wind turbine.

Landscape and ecological issues may be significant for some wind farm proposals, and environmental issues are a consideration in site selection. Communities which support renewable energy projects may oppose local development due to perceived environmental harms. This includes sound pollution and visual concerns.

Worldwide experience has shown that community consultation and direct involvement of the general public in wind farm projects has helped to increase community approval, and some wind farms overseas have become tourist attractions, like the Ten Mile Lagoon Wind Farm.

Perceived impacts by communities that oppose wind power claim reduced property values, decreased tourism, increased traffic, or increased economic inequality. Although research has shown no measurable evidence, the perception of these can impact the acceptance of wind power in an area.

== Offshore wind power ==
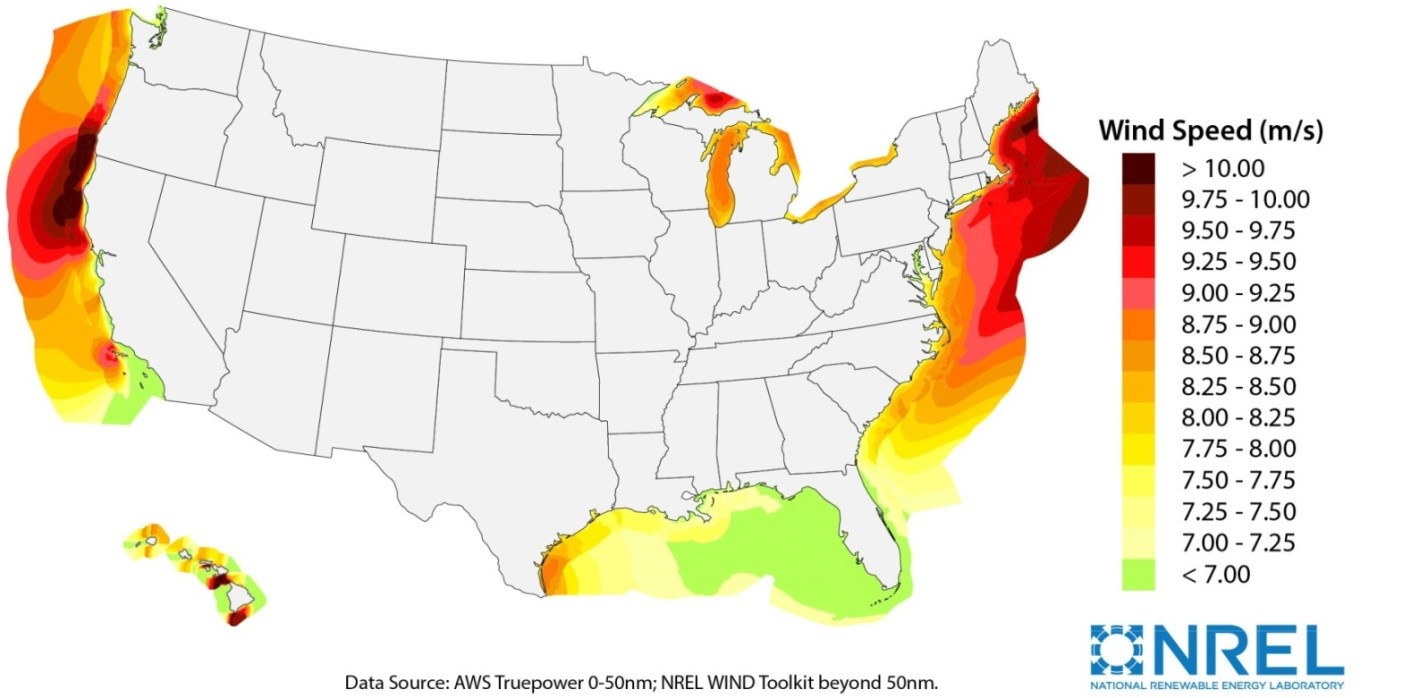
Offshore wind power potential in the United States

Offshore development is hindered by relatively high cost compared to onshore facilities. The United States has very large offshore wind energy resources due to strong, consistent winds off the long U.S. coastline.

The 2011 NREL report, Large-Scale Offshore Wind Power in the United States, analyzed the offshore wind energy industry. According to the report, offshore wind resource development would help the country to achieve 20% of its electric power from wind by 2030 and to revitalize the manufacturing sector. Offshore wind could supply 54 gigawatts of capacity to the nation's electrical grid, thereby increasing energy security. It could also generate an estimated $200 billion in new economic activity and create thousands of permanent jobs. NREL's report concludes that "the development of the nation's offshore wind resources can provide many potential benefits, and that offshore wind energy could play a vital role in future U.S. energy markets".

Coastal residents have opposed offshore wind farms because of fears about impacts on marine life, the environment, electric power rates, aesthetics, and recreation such as fishing and boating. Residents cite improved electric power rates, air quality, and job creation as positive impacts they would expect from wind farms. Because the bases of offshore turbines function as artificial reefs, studies have shown that after the initial disturbance of construction, local fish and shellfish are positively affected. Because wind turbines can be positioned at some distance from shore, impacts to recreation and fishing can be managed by careful planning of wind farm locations.

Five exploratory leases for wind power production on the Outer Continental Shelf offshore from New Jersey and Delaware were issued in June 2009 by the Secretary of the Interior. The leases authorize data gathering activities, allowing for the construction of meteorological towers on the Outer Continental Shelf from six to 18 miles (29 km) offshore. Four areas were being considered. On February 7, 2011, Salazar and Steven Chu announced a national strategy to have offshore wind power of 10 GW in 2020, and 54 GW in 2030. In 2021 the Biden Administration announced a target of 30 GW of offshore wind by 2030. In the first quarter of 2024, there was a significant increase in the installed offshore wind capacity in the U.S., rising from 42 megawatts (MW) to 242 MW.

=== New England ===
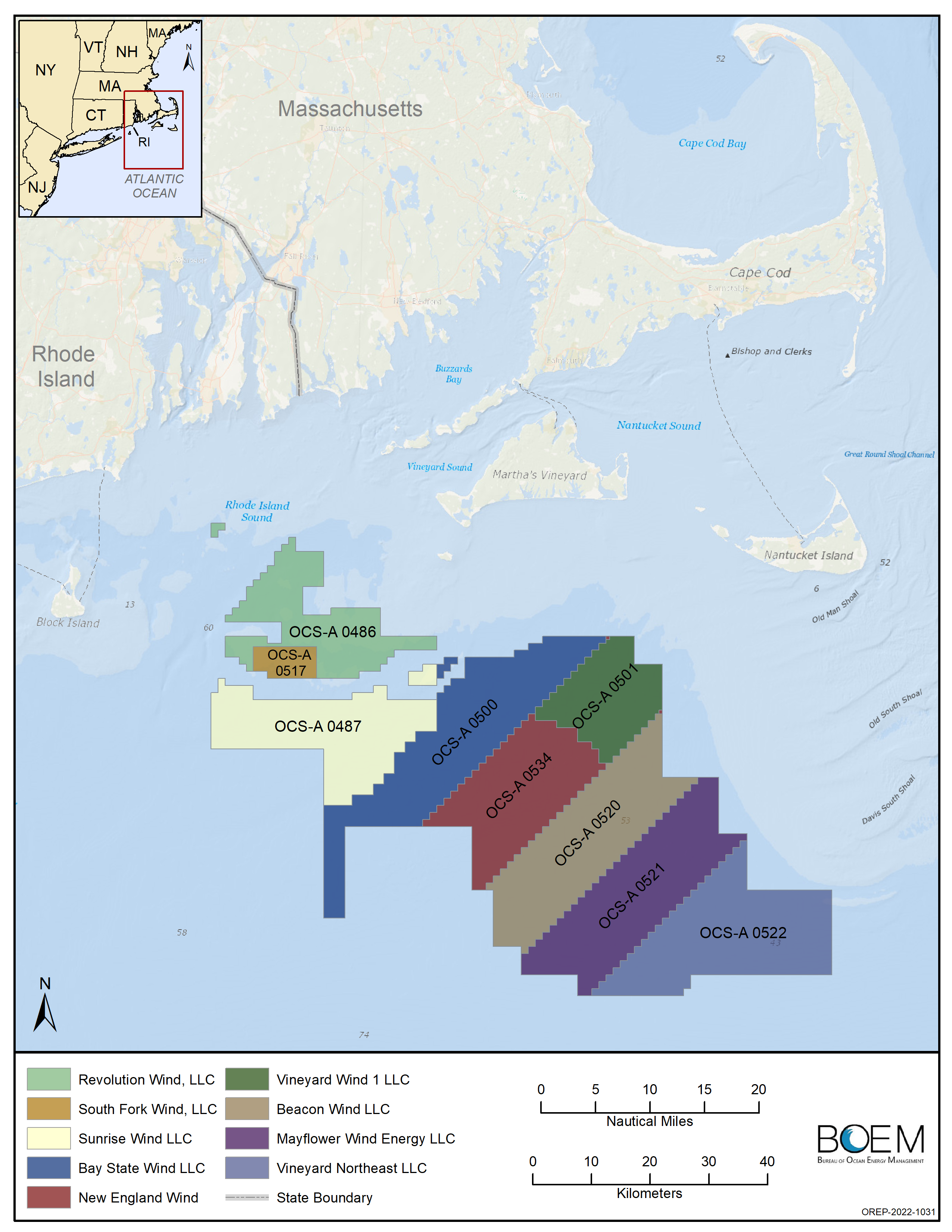
Designated wind power leasing parcels in federal waters off the coasts of Massachusetts and Rhode Island, with project names as of 2022

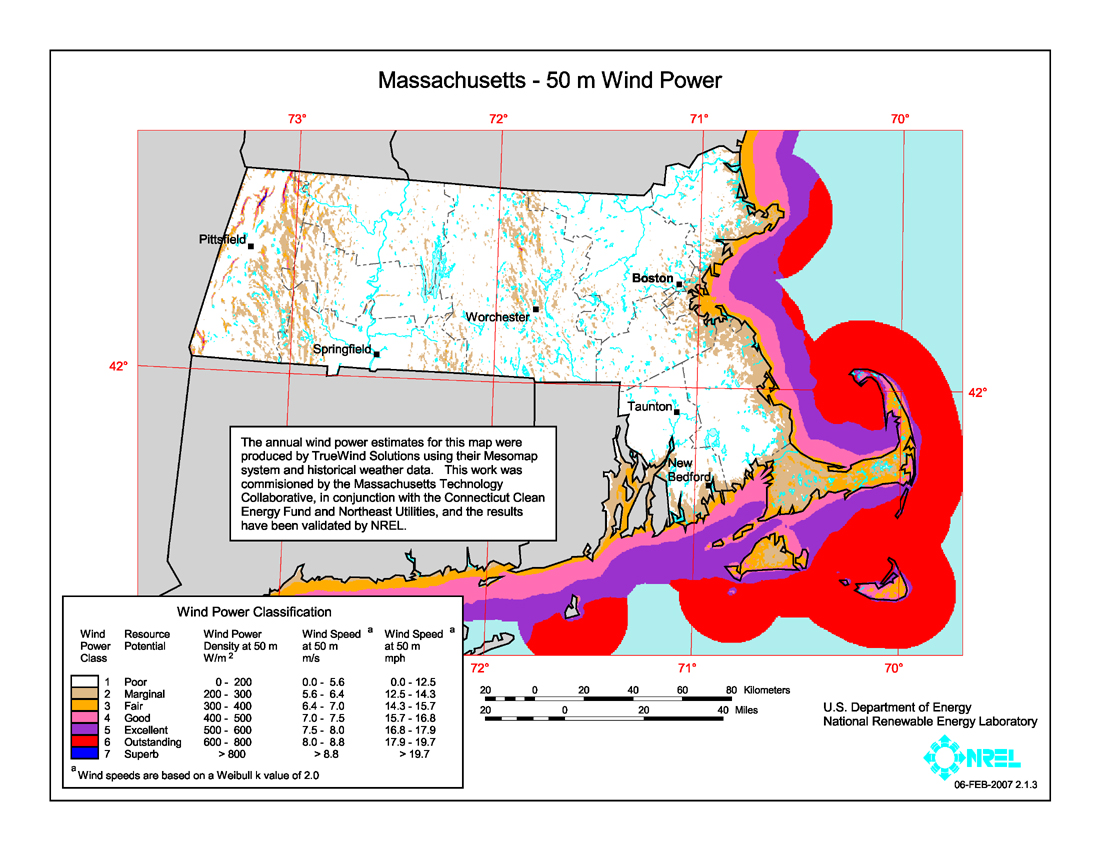
Massachusetts and Rhode Island have strong offshore wind resources.

Rhode Island and Massachusetts state officials picked Deepwater Wind to build a $1.5-billion, 385-megawatt wind farm in federal waters off Block Island. The 100-turbine project could provide 1.3 terawatt-hours (TW·h) of electric power per year – 15 percent of all electric power used in the state of Rhode Island. In 2009, Deepwater signed an agreement with National Grid to sell the power from a smaller $200-million, 30-MW wind farm off Block Island, at an initial price of 24.4 ¢/kW·h. Construction of the Block Island Wind Farm, a five turbine project began in April 2015 and was completed in December 2016 to become the first offshore wind farm in the United States.

Cape Wind started development around 2002, but faced opposition and eventually ceased before being realized. The floating VolturnUS operated in Penobscot Bay near Castine from June 2013 to November 2014. Maine Aqua Ventus intends to have an 11 MW floating turbine in operation off the coast of Monhegan Island by the end of 2023.

Construction began on the 804 MW Vineyard Wind off-shore project on November 18, 2021, after a long fight for approval. Power from the first turbine started flowing into the ISO New England grid on January 2, 2024. The project was completed in March 2026. A second large offshore project, SouthCoast Wind (formerly Mayflower Wind), is in development, among others.

=== Mid Atlantic ===
To promote wind power in New Jersey, in 2007 the state awarded a $4.4 million contract to conduct an 18-month Ocean/Wind Power Ecological Baseline Study, becoming the first state to sponsor an ocean and wind power study before allowing renewable energy developers to study and build off its shores. The study focused on a designated area off the coast to determine the current distribution, abundance and migratory patterns of avian species, fish, marine resources and sea turtle use of the existing ecological resources. The results of the study were released in June 2010. The study concluded that the effects of developing offshore windfarms would be negligible.

In 2008, new federal rules greatly expanded the territory offshore wind parks can be built. Previously, projects were only allowed in shallow state waters within 3 nautical miles (5.6 km) of shore. The edge of U.S. territory is about 200 nautical miles (370 km) out. Increased distance from the coast diminishes their visibility. Waters off the coast of the United States are deeper than in Europe, requiring different designs.

Ocean Wind is a proposed utility-scale offshore wind farm with a capacity of 1100MW to be located on the Outer Continental Shelf approximately 15 miles (24 km) off the coast of Atlantic City, New Jersey. If built it will be the largest in the U.S. In September 2020, New Jersey officials halted the Ørsted Ocean Wind Project citing concerns about misrepresented economic benefits of offshore wind, including construction of monopoles, utilization of women- and minority-owned businesses, union labor, possible negative effects on the fishing industry.

Coastal Virginia Offshore Wind (CVOW) is an offshore wind energy pilot project located about 27 miles (43 km) off the coast of Virginia Beach, Virginia. The two-turbine, 12-MW pilot project, constructed in 2020, is the second utility scale offshore wind farm operating in the United States. Dominion Energy and Ørsted US Offshore Wind collaborated on the project.

=== Great Lakes ===
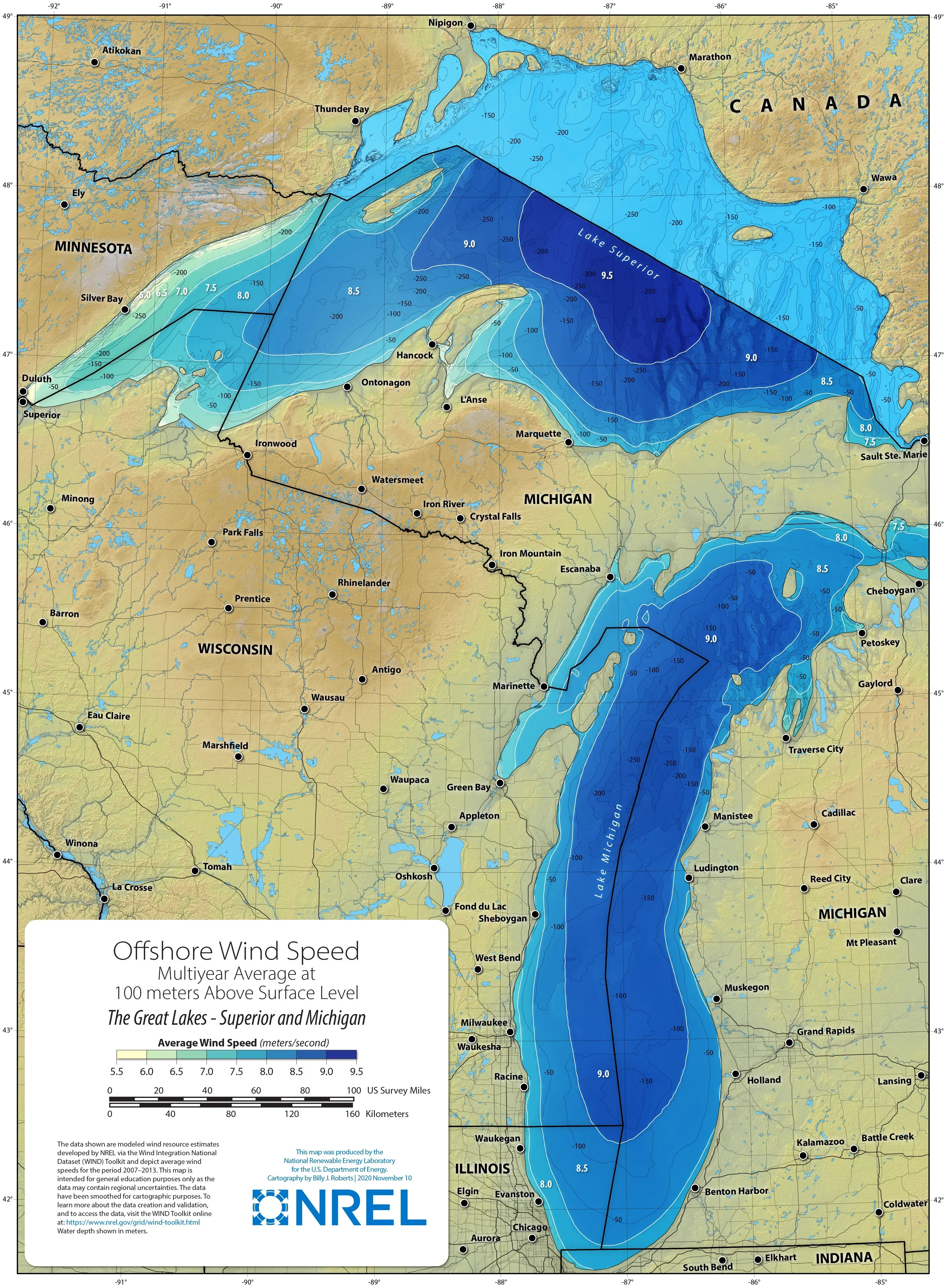
Great Lakes wind potential for Lake Superior and Lake Michigan

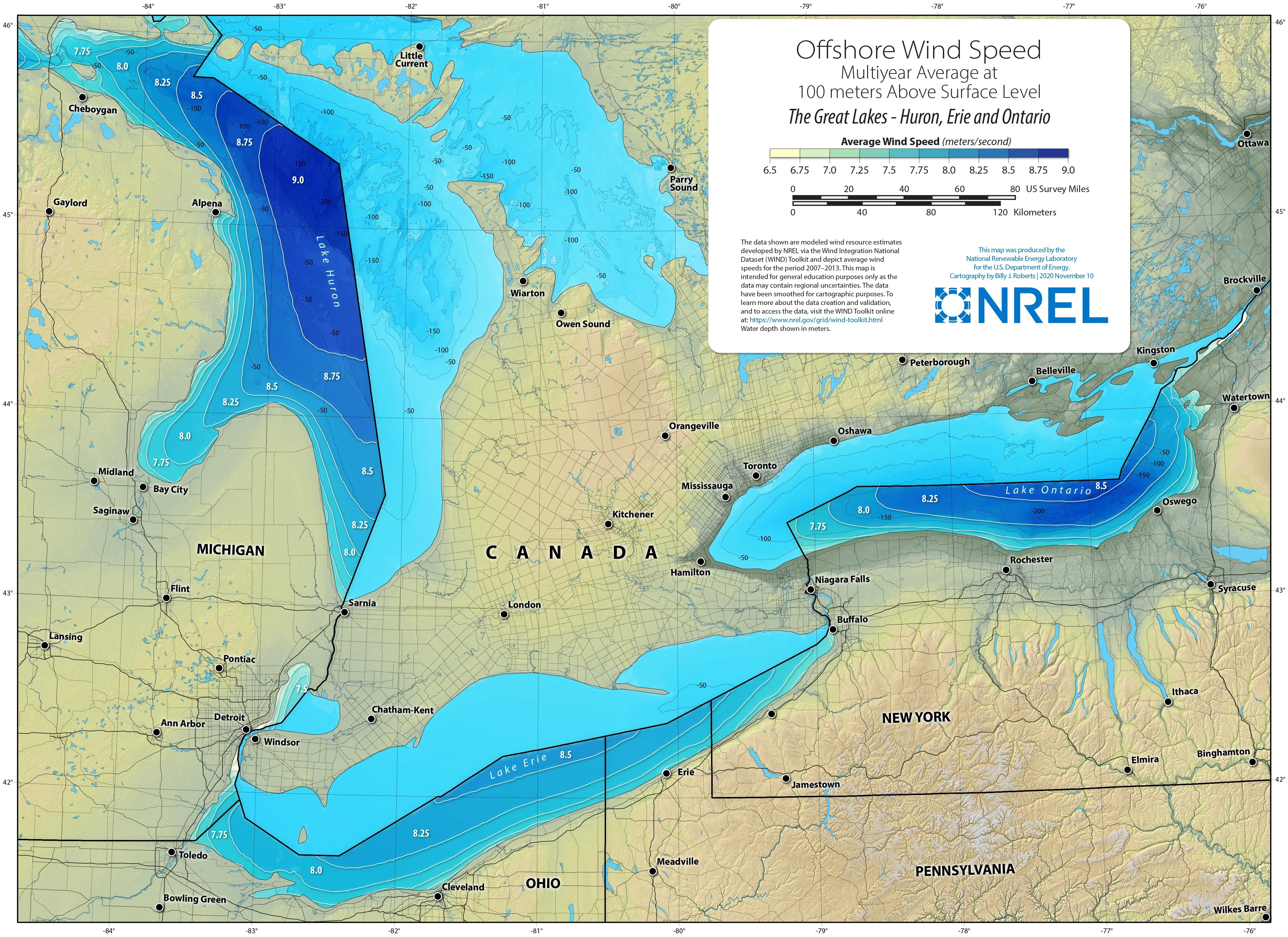
Wind potential for lakes Huron, Erie, and Ontario

The Great Lakes have offshore wind potential of 160 gigawatts for fixed bottom wind turbines and 415 gigawatts for floating wind energy systems. Challenges include not being able to navigate a wind turbine installation vessel to the Great Lakes Waterway through the St. Lawrence Seaway, Welland Canal, or Soo Locks. Special heavy equipment vessels and offshore wind ports would likely need to be built within the Great Lakes shores to create the supply chain necessary to build and install larger offshore wind turbines. Freezing ice is another challenge which hasn't been dealt with before with offshore wind farms because they have been built in saline sea water. A planned pilot project of six fixed bottom wind turbines on Lake Erie, Icebreaker, was put on hold in December 2023.

== Wind energy meteorology ==
Upper: the propagation of transient waves. Lower: the time and spatial variation of the related capacity factor values (CF) at 100m. The power curves and technical parameters for the GE 2.5 MW turbines is used to calculate the instantaneous capacity factor.

Winds in the Central Plains region of the U.S. are variable on both short (minutes) and long (days) time scales. Variations in wind speed result in variations in power output from wind farms, which poses difficulties incorporating wind power into an integrated power system. Wind turbines are driven by boundary layer winds, those that occur near the surface of the earth, at around 300 feet. Boundary layer winds are controlled by wind in the higher free atmosphere and have turbulence due to interaction with surface features such as trees, hills, and buildings. Short term or high frequency variations are due to this turbulence in the boundary layer.

Long term variations are due to the passage of transient waves in the atmosphere, with a characteristic time scale of several days. The transient waves that influence wind in the Central U.S. are large scale and this results in the power output from wind farms in the region being somewhat correlated and not entirely independent. Large scale distribution of wind farms significantly reduce short term variability, limiting the relative standard deviation of the capacity factor to about 45%. The correlation is highest in summer and lowest in winter.

== Environmental impacts and regulations ==
=== Bird protection ===
U.S. President Donald Trump's opposition to wind power involves repeated claims that "windmills" "kill the birds", but cats in the U.S. actually kill on the order of 10,000 times as many birds as wind turbines.

The US federal government has jurisdiction to prevent bird and bat deaths by wind turbines, under the Endangered Species Act, the Migratory Bird Treaty Act, and the Bald and Golden Eagle Protection Act. Under the 2009 Bald and Golden Eagle Protection Act, the Interior Department could issue permits to allow "non-purposeful take" for activities where eagle deaths were considered unavoidable; however, as of December 2013, no take permits had been issued to wind energy developers. The United States Fish and Wildlife Service has published voluntary guidelines for design and siting of wind turbines to minimize bird and bat deaths.

In 2013, the Obama administration was accused of having a double standard to protect the wind industry from Bald and Golden Eagle Protection Act prosecutions, while vigorously pursuing violations by oil companies and owners of power lines. The administration refused to divulge the number of raptor deaths reported to it by wind companies, saying that to do so would reveal trade secrets. The government also ordered federal law enforcement field agents not to pursue bird-death prosecutions against wind companies without prior approval from Washington. The policy was said to be an environmental trade-off to promote renewable energy.

In November 2013, the federal government obtained its first criminal conviction of a wind power operator for killing protected birds in violation of the 1918 Migratory Bird Treaty Act. Duke Energy plead guilty, and was fined $1 million, for the deaths of 160 birds, including 14 golden eagles, at two wind farms in Wyoming. The Justice Department charged that Duke had designed and sited the turbines knowing that they would kill birds; Duke noted that it had self-reported the bird deaths, and that US Fish and Wildlife Service guidelines for reducing bird deaths by wind turbines had not been issued when the turbines were built. After they were charged, Duke implemented a radar detection system, at a cost of $600,000 per year, designed to turn off turbines when approached by large birds; the company noted that the system was working, as no golden eagle deaths had been observed in more than a year of operation since the radar was installed.

In December 2013, the US Fish and Wildlife Service announced that it would issue 30-year permits to wind energy projects to allow for eagle deaths; previously, permits had been available for only five years, but none were issued to wind projects. Under the 30-year permits, wind power developers would be required to report eagle deaths, and the permits would be reviewed every five years. The measure was intended to remove what was seen as legal uncertainty discouraging wind energy investments. The government said that an environmental review was not needed for the change, because it was only an administrative change. The new regulation was welcomed by the American Wind Energy Association, which said that wind power caused less than two percent of human-caused eagle fatalities, and pointed out that the rules would require extensive mitigation and monitoring of eagle deaths. The extension of eagle taking permits from 5 to 30 years was opposed by a number of conservation groups, including the American Bird Conservancy, the Nature Conservancy, the Sierra Club, the Audubon Society, and the Humane Society of the United States.

More than 30,000 wind turbine locations are within federally protected bird habitats, out of which almost 24,000 lie in the migratory corridor of the whooping crane and almost 3000 in the breeding grounds of the endangered greater sage-grouse. According to Dr. Michael Hutchins, the director of the American Bird Conservancy's Bird Smart Wind Energy Campaign, wind turbines present a threat to the nation's birds, and that the present permitting process is ineffective in addressing the issue. Concern about the bird deaths prompted the American Bird Conservancy and 70 other conservation organizations, to lobby the U.S. Department of Interior to develop a National Programmatic Wind Environmental impact statement which would identify appropriate areas for wind energy development, as well as areas where development should be avoided, but these lobbying efforts failed. Tom Vinson, the American Wind Energy Association vice president for regulatory affairs noted the ambiguity in estimation and extrapolation of various data and also questioned the credibility of the assumptions of organizations such as American Bird Conservancy in estimating future bird deaths.

Collision risks are primarily influenced by the height of the turbines and tower type. The average death count of birds increases as turbine heights reach 475 to 639 feet. Danger to birds increases because blades at higher altitudes overlap with the average flight height of nocturnally migrating birds.

A 2025 systematic review highlighted the diverse environmental, social, technical, and economic impacts of wind energy developments, emphasizing the importance of integrated assessment frameworks to address challenges such as biodiversity loss, noise pollution, and community acceptance.

=== Offshore wind ===
All offshore wind development requires either federal or state approval and a lease since offshore land is government property. Offshore wind regulation authority has shifted through several federal agencies since the early 2000s. Prior to 2005, offshore wind turbine and farm permits were under the jurisdiction of the US Army Corps of Engineers. In 2005, with the passing of the Energy Policy Act, the Minerals Management Service within the Department of the Interior had authority over wind turbine development on federal waters, like the Outer Continental Shelf, and was responsible for evaluating economic value, potential environmental impacts, and coordinating with federal and state agencies when approving wind power permits. In 2010, the Minerals Management Service was divided into three agencies, of which the Bureau of Ocean Energy Management is responsible for leasing, permitting, monitoring, and regulating offshore wind energy.

The harassment of any marine mammal species in U.S. waters is a violation of the Marine Mammal Protection Act of 1972 (50 CFR 18). Offshore wind developers are required to apply for a letter of authorization or Incidental Harassment Authorization with all the pertinent details of the species under potential threat from their offshore activities, the mitigation measures, and monitoring and reporting obligations. Offshore wind projects must also comply with all regulatory obligations contained in the Federally approved State coastal management plan, under the Coastal Zone Management Act of 1972, to keep in check their effect on coastal resources.

== Statistics ==
United States wind generation (GWh)
Year	Total	% of total	Jan	Feb	Mar	Apr	May	Jun	Jul	Aug	Sep	Oct	Nov	Dec
1990	2,789													
1991	2,951													
1992	2,888													
1993	3,006													
1994	3,447													
1995	3,164													
1996	3,234													
1997	3,288													
1998	3,026													
1999	4,488													
2000	5,593													
2001	6,737		389	431	532	685	635	670	635	577	490	607	470	616
2002	10,353		811	714	852	1,024	1,078	1,126	890	977	736	734	656	755
2003	11,185		632	745	1,036	1,093	1,006	1,047	953	815	895	897	961	1,105
2004	14,144	0.36%	999	1,022	1,291	1,295	1,702	1,397	1,164	1,051	1,090	1,029	932	1,172
2005	17,811	0.36%	1,132	966	1,561	1,698	1,746	1,797	1,421	1,138	1,468	1,446	1,610	1,828
2006	26,589	0.65%	2,383	1,922	2,359	2,472	2,459	2,052	1,955	1,655	1,879	2,442	2,540	2,472
2007	34,449	0.77%	2,452	2,520	3,047	3,172	2,952	2,620	2,158	2,699	2,867	3,377	3,095	3,490
2008	55,363	1.34%	4,273	3,852	4,782	5,225	5,340	5,140	4,008	3,264	3,111	4,756	4,994	6,616
2009	73,886	1.87%	5,951	5,852	7,099	7,458	6,262	5,599	4,955	5,464	4,651	6,814	6,875	6,906
2010	94,652	2.29%	6,854	5,432	8,589	9,764	8,698	8,049	6,724	6,686	7,106	7,944	9,748	9,059
2011	120,177	2.93%	8,550	10,452	10,545	12,422	11,772	10,985	7,489	7,476	6,869	10,525	12,439	10,656
2012	140,822	3.48%	13,631	11,052	14,026	12,709	12,540	11,972	8,823	8,469	8,790	12,636	11,648	14,524
2013	167,840	4.13%	14,739	14,076	15,756	17,476	16,239	13,748	11,094	9,634	11,674	13,635	15,803	13,967
2014	181,655	4.44%	17,911	14,009	17,736	18,636	15,601	15,799	12,187	10,171	11,520	14,508	18,867	14,711
2015	190,719	4.68%	15,162	14,922	15,308	17,867	17,151	13,421	13,675	13,080	13,972	16,380	19,682	20,098
2016	226,993	5.57%	18,466	20,138	21,939	20,799	18,848	16,303	17,618	13,589	16,404	20,335	19,406	23,146
2017	254,303	6.3%	20,779	22,091	25,731	25,378	23,068	20,142	16,120	13,879	17,912	24,369	22,615	22,201
2018	272,667	6.52%	25,599	23,189	26,464	26,431	23,953	24,703	16,447	19,846	18,520	21,194	22,016	24,306
2019	295,882	7.16%	25,165	23,047	26,036	30,217	26,474	23,400	22,470	19,867	24,299	28,144	25,656	27,183
2020	337,938	8.43%	28,121	29,110	29,320	29,752	28,378	30,212	22,866	23,029	23,186	28,823	33,129	32,011
2021	378,197	9.2%	30,060	26,716	39,205	36,158	33,787	26,672	21,716	27,071	28,998	32,215	35,751	39,849
2022	434,297	10.27%	37,416	37,645	43,031	46,167	42,124	33,768	29,495	24,718	27,331	32,745	41,199	38,680
2023	421,141	10.07%	38,358	41,424	43,584	42,746	32,227	27,547	28,005	28,394	28,353	36,020	36,445	38,038
2024	451,904	10.49%	34,791	40,982	45,102	47,088	39,256	38,661	28,304	29,290	29,178	39,592	40,133	39,527
2025	461,577	10,43%	42,711	38,726	49,673	45,483	37,127	36,107	31,890	27,661	26,046	39,518	40,138	46,497
2026	333,367	10,85%	44,434	39,707	52,219	49,136	41,157	41,888	32,184	33,317				
Last entry, % of total			11.12%	11.58%	14.97%	14.86%	13.85%	10,48%	8,26%	7,07%	7,25%	11,54%	12,10%	12,24%

Selected monthly wind generation profiles
United States (2022)	United States (2016)
Texas (2016)	Iowa (2018)
Oklahoma (2015)	California 2015
Illinois 2015	Kansas 2015
Minnesota 2015

Wind electric generation in the United States
Year	Summer capacity (GW)	Electricity generation (TWh)	Capacity factor	Yearly growth of generating capacity	Yearly growth of produced energy	Portion of renewable electricity	Portion of total electricity
2018	94.3	274.95	0.333	7.6%	8%	40%	6.80%
2017	87.54	254.26	0.331	7.8%	12%	37%	6.30%
2016	81.29	226.99	0.319	12.0%	19%	37.2%	5.57%
2015	72.58	190.72	0.300	12.0%	5.00%	35.04%	4.68%
2014	64.85	181.79	0.320	8.13%	8.31%	33.68%	4.44%
2013	59.97	161.84	0.319	1.51%	19.19%	32.15%	4.13%
2012	59.08	140.82	0.272	29.33%	17.17%	28.47%	3.48%
2011	45.68	120.18	0.300	16.71%	26.97%	23.41%	2.93%
2010	39.14	94.65	0.276	14.11%	28.10%	22.15%	2.29%
2009	34.30	73.89	0.246	39.15%	33.47%	17.69%	1.87%
2008	24.65	55.36	0.256	49.21%	60.70%	14.53%	1.34%
2007	16.52	34.45	0.238	45.81%	29.56%	9.77%	0.83%
2006	11.33	26.59	0.268	30.08%	49.30%	6.89%	0.65%
2005	8.71	17.81	0.233	34.83%	25.95%	4.98%	0.44%
2004	6.46	14.14	0.250	7.67%	26.36%	4.02%	0.36%

== See also ==
- List of wind farms in the United States
- Wind ENergy Data & Information (WENDI) Gateway

US renewables:

- Solar power in the United States
- Geothermal energy in the United States
- Biofuel in the United States
- Hydroelectric power in the United States
- List of renewable energy companies in the United States

International:

- Renewable energy by country
