= Wind power in Alaska =

Electricity from wind in one U.S. state

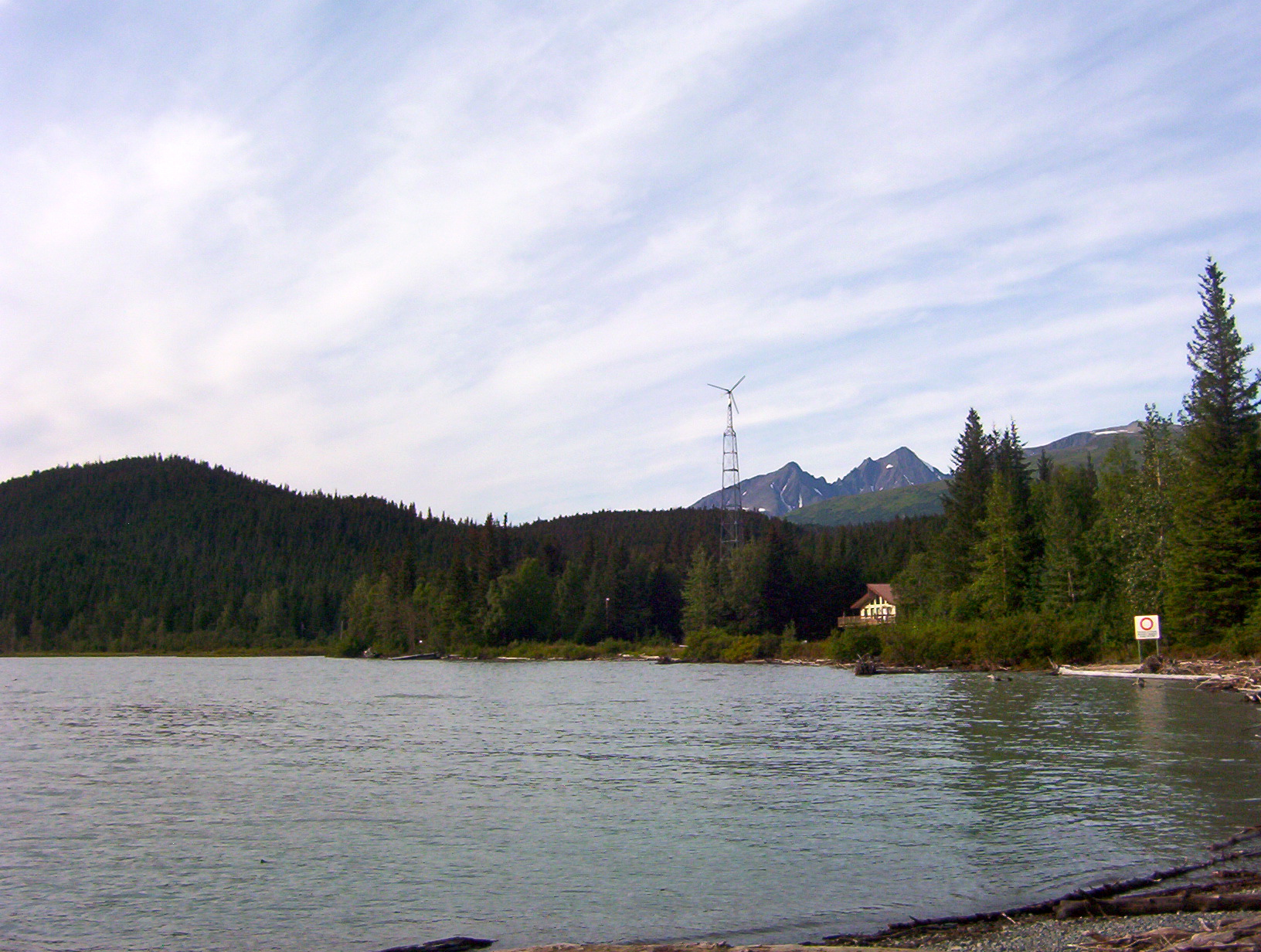
A small wind turbine in Primrose, Alaska

Wind power in Alaska has the potential to provide all of the electricity used in the U.S. state of Alaska. From its installation, in July 2009 through October 2012, the Pillar Mountain Wind 4.5 MW wind farm has saved the use of nearly 3,000,000 US gallons (11,000,000 L) of diesel fuel in Kodiak, Alaska.

== Potential production ==
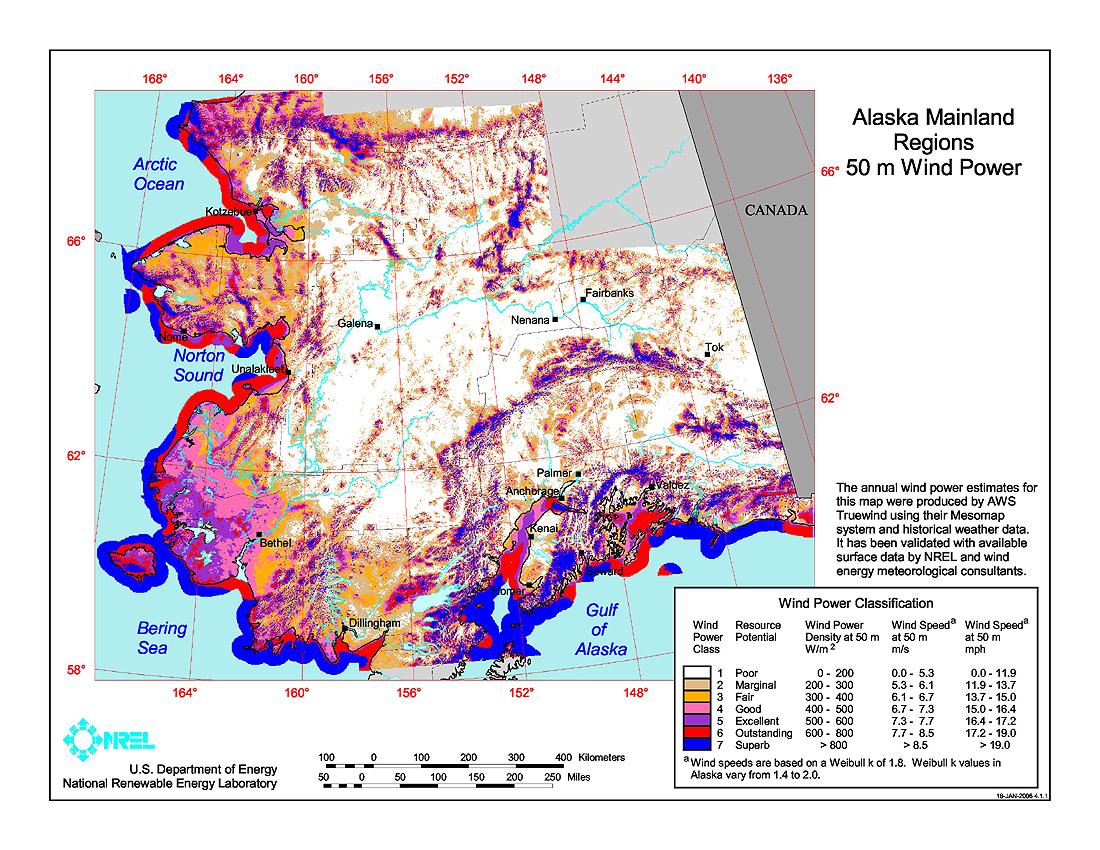
Alaska wind resources

In early 2010, the National Renewable Energy Laboratory released the first comprehensive update of wind energy potential by state since 1993, showing that Alaska has the potential to install 494,700 MW of wind power, capable of generating 1,620,000 million kWh/year. Alaska used 6,291 million kWh in 2011.

== Projects ==
- Eva Creek Wind Project
- Fire Island Wind Project
- Pillar Mountain Wind Project

== Statistics ==
The following is a table comparing the growth of wind power installed nameplate capacity in MW for Alaska and the entire United States by year from 1999 through 2019.

Year	Alaska	US
1999	0.7	2,472
2000	0.8	2,539
2001	0.8	4,232
2002	0.9	4,687
2003	0.9	6,350
2004	1.2	6,723
2005	1.5	9,147
2006	1.7	11,575
2007	1.7	16,907
2008	3.7	25,410
2009	8.5	34,863
2010	8.7	40,267
2011	11	46,916
2012	59	60,005
2013	62	61,107
2014	62	65,880
2015	62	74,471
2016	62	82,171
2017	62	89,078
2018	63	96,487
2019	64	105,583
2020	64	122,478

== See also ==
- Solar power in Alaska
- Wind power in the United States
- Renewable energy in the United States
