= Wind power in Idaho =

Electricity from wind in one U.S. state

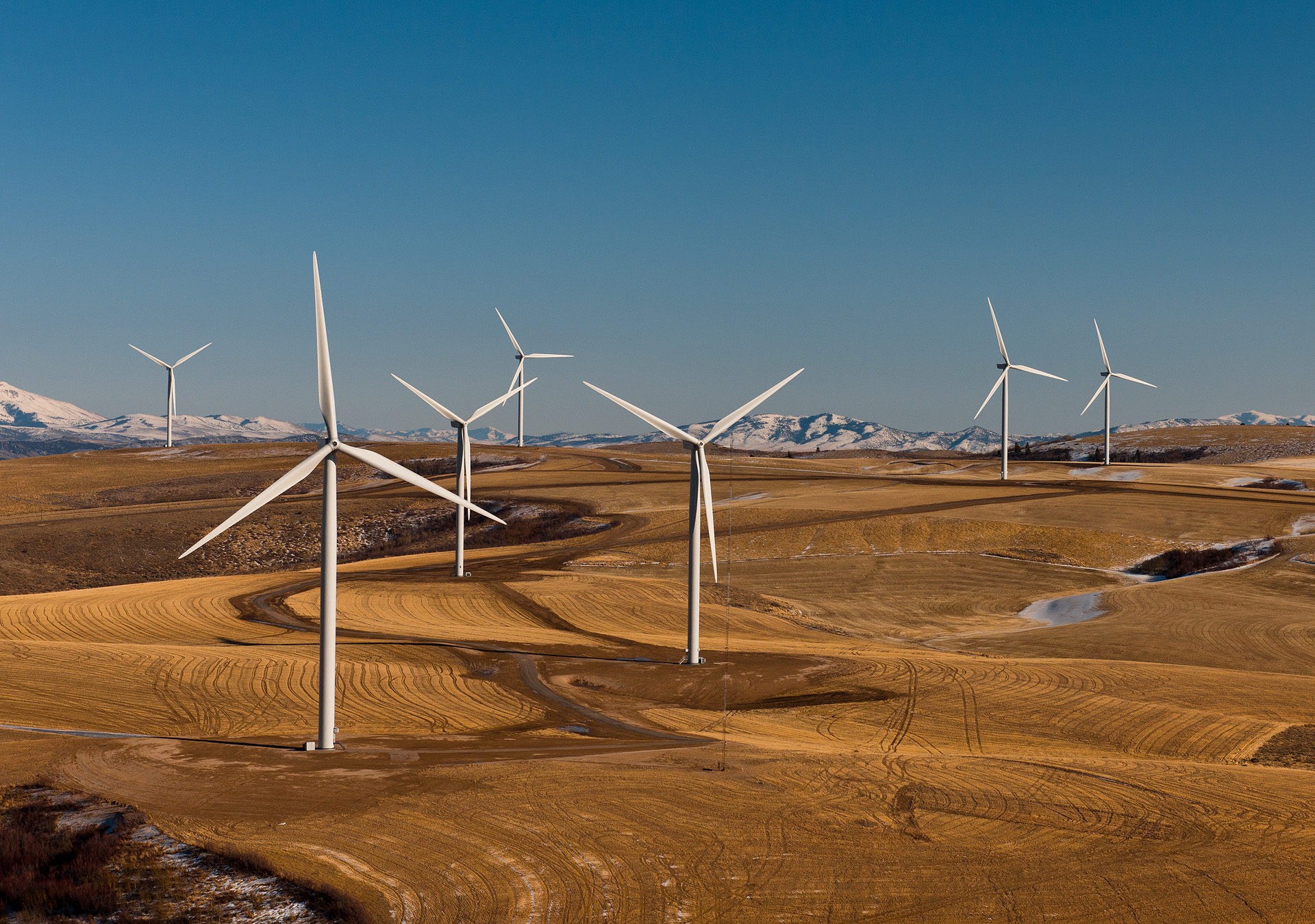
Wind turbines in Idaho

Wind power in Idaho could generate more energy than the state uses.

== Overview ==
At the end of 2016, Idaho had 973 MW of wind power generating capacity installed, accounting for over 15% of its generated electricity.

Idaho wind generation by year	Idaho wind generation capacity by year
Thousands of megawatt-hours generated	Megawatts of wind capacity

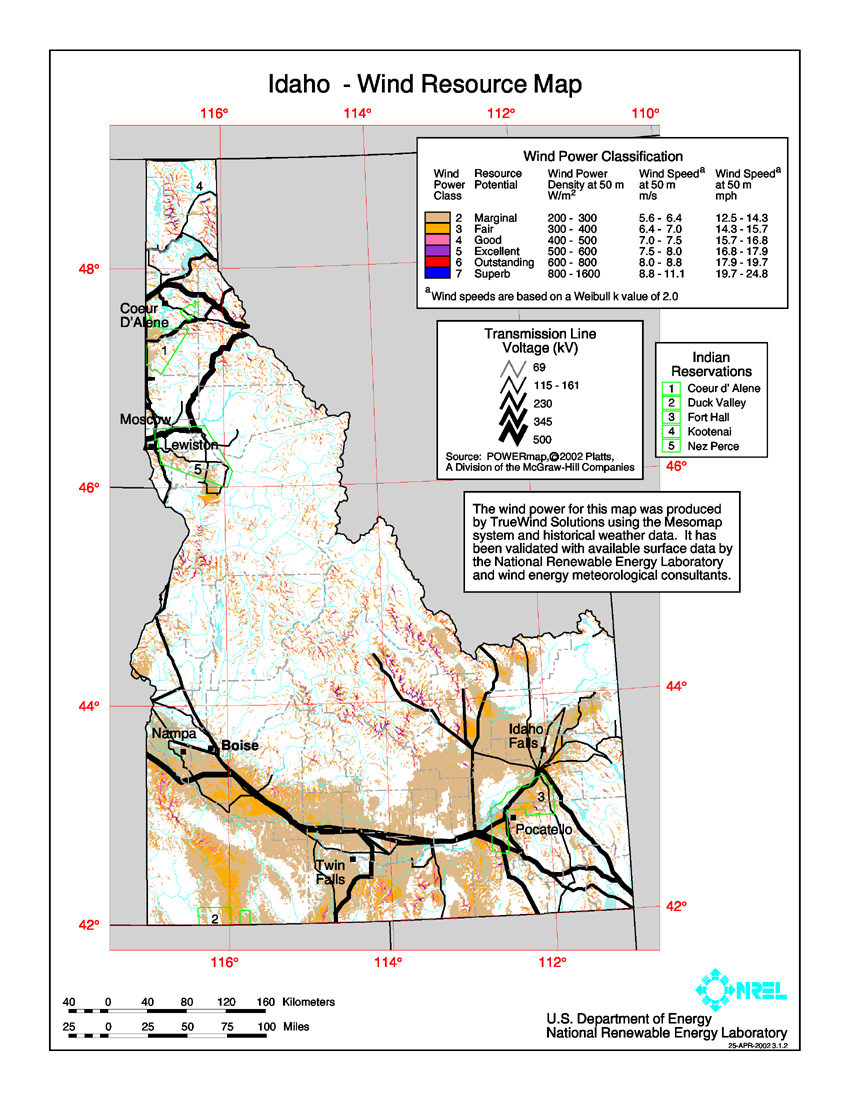
Idaho wind resources

Idaho could potentially install 18,000 MW of wind power, capable of generating 52,000 million kWh/year, according to a study by the National Renewable Energy Laboratory. Idaho used 23,063 million kWh in 2016.

== Wind farms ==
The 125 MW Goshen Wind Farm has been the state's largest wind facility since 2010.

== Wind generation ==
Idaho wind generation (GWh, million kWh)
Year	Total	Jan	Feb	Mar	Apr	May	Jun	Jul	Aug	Sep	Oct	Nov	Dec
2006	169	14	10	18	16	16	14	10	12	9	15	21	14
2007	171	10	16	17	13	16	15	9	17	14	13	17	14
2008	209	20	19	19	18	17	16	11	12	12	18	22	25
2009	315	30	23	32	29	23	18	16	18	21	33	34	38
2010	442	26	20	28	33	34	26	22	23	26	57	69	78
2011	1,306	52	101	158	134	113	123	106	81	65	122	143	108
2012	1,891	169	110	200	132	134	127	104	116	93	160	180	366
2013	2,459	154	216	239	294	207	183	174	185	227	172	243	165
2014	2,806	206	326	301	294	205	240	186	131	192	238	265	222
2015	2,272	122	207	235	223	152	141	148	168	191	182	225	278
2016	2,577	224	251	293	248	193	202	216	151	99	167	234	299
2017	2,546	236	231	243	241	231	174	144	156	162	245	234	249
2018	2,655	234	217	274	277	206	228	182	188	192	202	222	233
2019	2,550	219	217	215	231	213	192	197	178	226	219	222	221
2020	2,770	269	323	232	226	243	233	190	187	150	234	254	229
2021	2,656	224	232	286	258	228	180	142	165	194	216	257	274
2022	2,887	278	283	297	300	250	191	156	149	183	234	295	271
2023	819	237	290	292									

Teal background indicates the largest wind generation month for the year.

Green background indicates the largest wind generation month to date.

Idaho wind generation in 2017

== See also ==
- Wind power in the United States
- Solar power in Idaho
