= Los Vientos Wind Farm =

Wind farm in Texas, USA

- Country: United States
- Location: Texas
- Coordinates: 26.3548°N 97.6757°W
- Status: Operational
- Commission date: 2016
- Owner: Duke Energy

Wind farm
- Type: Onshore

Power generation
- Units operational: 426
- Make and model: Siemens SWT-2.3-108, Mitsubishi Heavy Industries MWT 102, Vestas V110-2.0 MW
- Nameplate capacity: 912 MW

Los Vientos Wind Farm is a 912 megawatt (MW) wind farm in Starr and Willacy counties in South Texas. It is the second largest wind farm in the United States behind the Alta Wind Energy Center in California.

== Facility details ==
The project was constructed in five phases. Construction commenced in 2012 and was completed in 2016. The energy generated by the five projects is purchased by five different customers.

A two year study conducted at the facility by Texas State University, Duke Energy Renewables, and NRG Systems found that an ultrasonic system developed by NRG Systems was able to reduce fatalities of some bat species by more than 50%. In 2019, Duke Energy began installing the deterrent systems at 255 turbines in Los Vientos III, IV, and V. Installation of the systems is expected to take five years.

== Overview ==
Plant	Capacity (MW)	Commissioned	Turbines	Customers
Los Vientos I	200	December 2012	87 Siemens SWT-2.3-108	CPS Energy
Los Vientos II	202	December 2012	84 Mitsubishi Heavy Industries MWT 102	Austin Energy
Los Vientos III	200	May 2015	100 Vestas V110-2.0 MW	Austin Energy
Los Vientos IV	200	August 2016	100 Vestas V110-2.0 MW	Austin Energy
Los Vientos V	110	December 2015	55 Vesta V110-2.0 MW	Garland Power & Light; Greenville Electric Utility System; Bryan Texas Utilities

== See also ==
- Wind power in the United States
- List of onshore wind farms
- Wind power in Texas
- List of power stations in Texas
