= Solar power in Idaho =

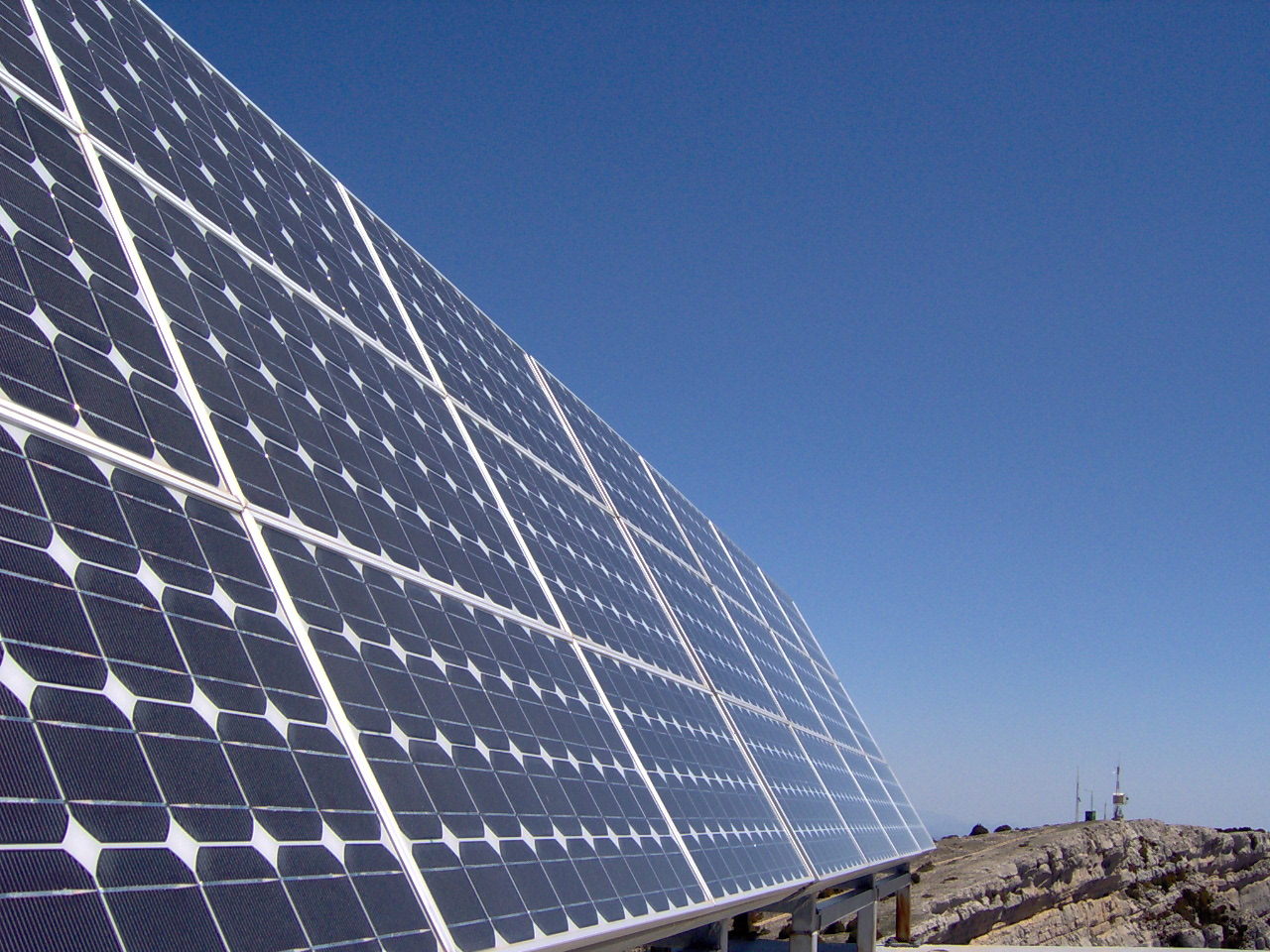
Solar panels

Solar power in Idaho comprised 550 MW in 2019. A 2016 report by the National Renewable Energy Laboratory estimated that rooftops alone have the potential to host 4,700 MW of solar panels, and thus provide 26.4% of all electricity used in Idaho. A large increase in the state's solar generating capacity began starting year 2015 when 461 MW of solar power was contracted to be built in Idaho.

Net metering is limited to 25 kW for residential users, and 100 kW for commercial users, other than for Avista Utilities customers, where the limit for all users is 100 kW.

== Currently operating (Note: As of December 31, 2025) ==
Solar Facilities in Idaho
#	Plant Name	Utility Name	County	Capacity (MW)	Operating Year
1	American Falls Solar	American Falls Solar LLC	Power	20.0	2017
2	American Falls Solar II	American Falls Solar II, LLC	Power	20.0	2017
3	Black Mesa Solar, LLC	Black Mesa Solar, LLC	Elmore	40.0	2023
4	Clif Bar Bakery of Twin Falls	Mondelez Global LLC (Twin Falls)	Twin Falls	1.6	2019
5	Franklin Solar Hybrid	Franklin Solar Idaho	Twin Falls	100.0	2024
6	Grand View Solar Two	Grand View PV Solar Two, LLC	Elmore	80.0	2016
7	ID Solar	AES Distributed Energy	Ada	40.0	2016
8	Jackpot Solar, LLC	Deriva Energy	Twin Falls	120.0	2022
9	Matrix Pleasant Valley	Pleasant Valley Solar, LLC	Ada	200.0	2025
10	Mt. Home Solar 1, LLC	Standard Solar	Elmore	20.0	2017
11	Murphy Flat Solar	Murphy Flat Power, LLC	Owyhee	20.0	2017
12	Orchard Ranch Solar	Orchard Ranch Solar, LLC	Ada	20.0	2017
13	Simcoe Solar	Simcoe Solar	Elmore	20.0	2017

== Statistics ==
=== Installed capacity ===
Source: NREL

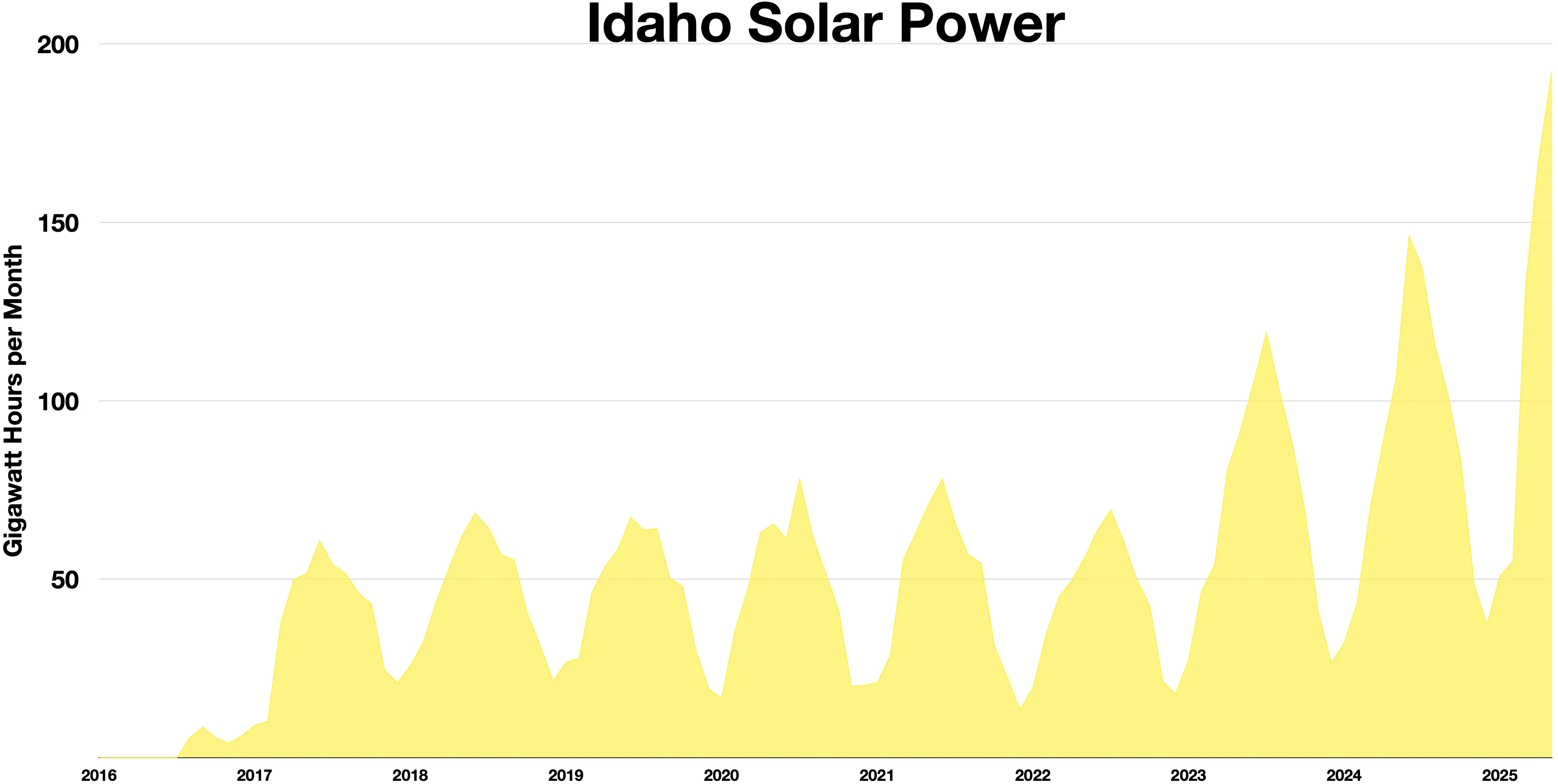
Idaho solar power 2016–2025

Grid-connected PV capacity (MW)
Year	Capacity	Installed	% Change
2009	0.1		
2010	0.2	0.2	100%
2011	0.4	0.2	100%
2012	1	0.7	175%
2013	1.8	0.7	64%
2014	2.6	0.8	44%
2015	4.6	2	76%
2016	300.6	296	6430%
2017	460	160.4	53%
2018	478	18	4%
2019	550.7	72.7	15%
2020	573	22.3	4%
2021	612.5	39.5	%
2022	644	31.5	%

=== Utility-scale generation ===
Utility-scale solar generation in Idaho (GWh)
Year	Total	Jan	Feb	Mar	Apr	May	Jun	Jul	Aug	Sep	Oct	Nov	Dec
2016	30	0	0	0	0	0	0	0	6	9	5	4	6
2017	461	9	10	38	50	52	61	54	52	46	43	25	21
2018	554	26	32	44	53	62	69	64	57	55	40	31	21
2019	556	27	28	46	53	58	68	64	64	51	48	30	19
2020	565	20	36	46	61	65	62	75	61	51	42	24	22
2021	433	23	30	54	62	70	73	64	57				

== Solar Farms ==
The 80 MW_{AC} (108 MW_{p}) Grandview Solar Farm has been the state's largest facility since its commissioning in 2016. In 2019, Idaho Power contracted a power purchase agreement for a 120 MW solar power station in 2022 at 2.175¢/kWh.

== See also ==
- Wind power in Idaho
- Solar power in the United States
- Renewable energy in the United States
