= List of power stations in Kansas =

Sources of Kansas utility-scale electricity generation in gigawatt-hours, full-year 2025:
1. Wind: 29,634 (47.0%)
2. Coal: 19,342 (30.7%)
3. Nuclear: 9,269 (14.7%)
4. Natural gas: 4,099 (6.51%)
5. Solar: 481 (0.76%)
6. Petroleum: 103 (0.16%)
7. Biomass: 55 (0.09%)
8. Hydroelectric: 23 (0.04%)

This is a list of electricity-generating power stations in the U.S. state of Kansas, sorted by type and name. In 2024, Kansas had a total summer capacity of 19.4 GW through all of its power plants, and a net generation of 57,696 GWh. In 2025, the electrical energy generation mix was 47% wind, 30.7% coal, 14.7% nuclear, 6.5% natural gas, 0.8% solar, 0.2% petroleum, 0.1% biomass, and less than 0.1% hydroelectric. Distributed small-scale solar, including customer-owned photovoltaic panels, delivered an additional net 201 GWh to the state's electricity grid in 2025. This is less than half the 481 GWh generated by Kansas's utility-scale solar facilities.

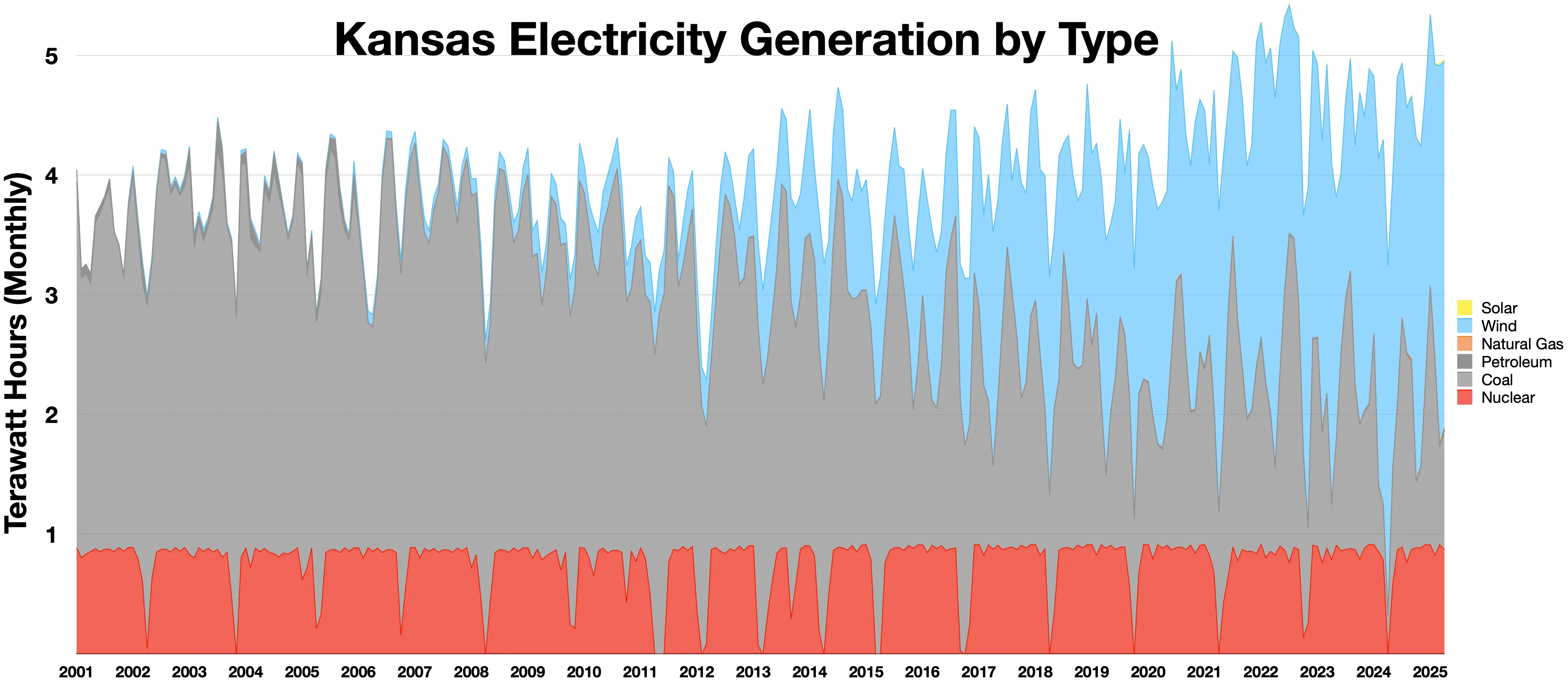
Kansas electricity generation by type

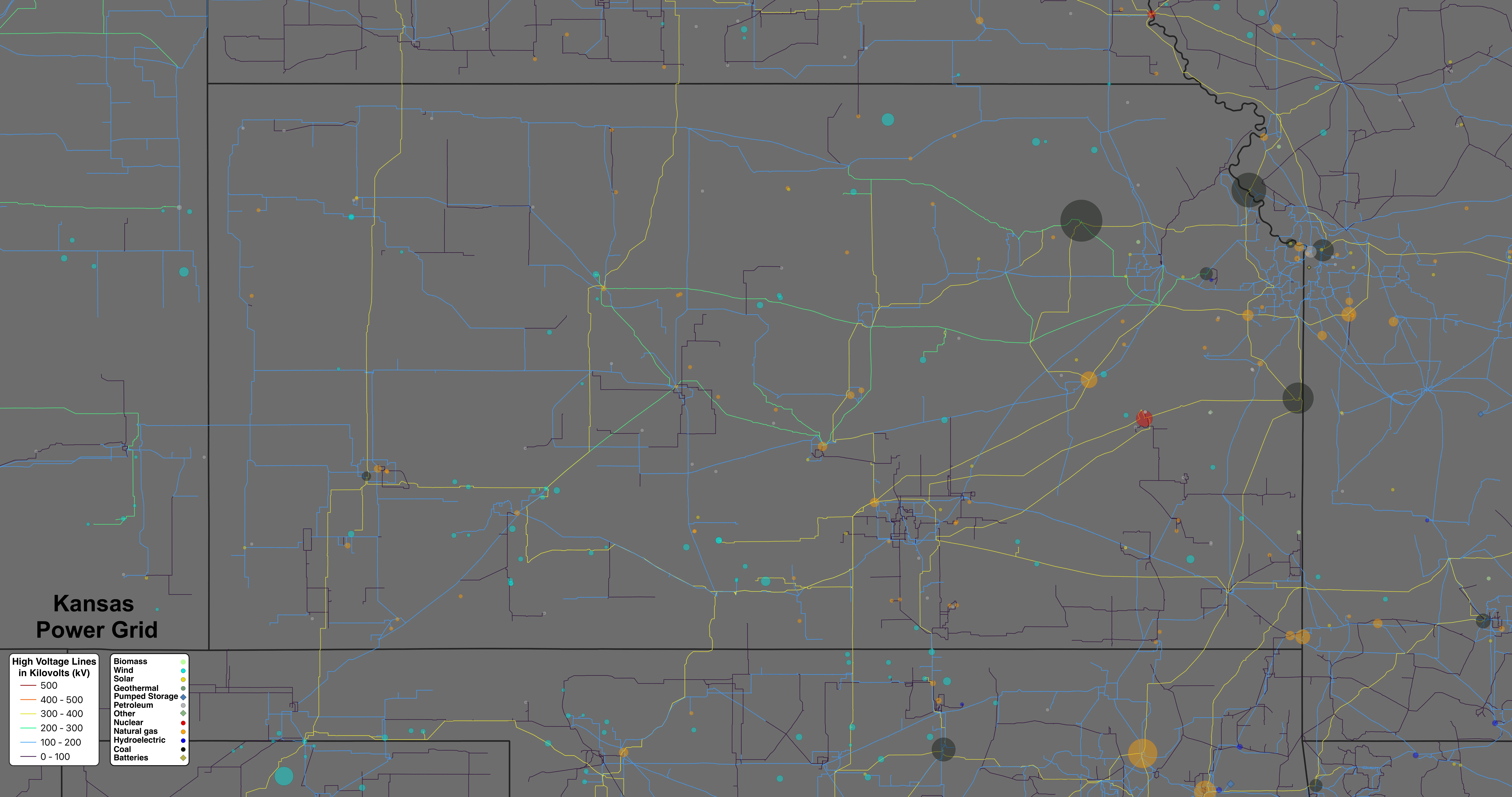
Kansas power grid

== Nuclear power stations ==
Data reported by U.S. Energy Information Administration
Plant name	Location	Coordinates	Capacity (MW)	Generation type	Year completed	Refs
Wolf Creek Generating Station	Coffey County	38°14′21″N 95°41′23″W	1267.7	Steam turbine	1985	

== Fossil-fuel power stations ==
Data reported by U.S. Energy Information Administration

=== Coal ===
Plant name	Location	Coordinates	Capacity (MW)	Generation type	Year completed	Scheduled retirement	Refs
Holcomb	Finney County	37°55′51″N 100°58′21″W	348.7	Steam turbine	1983	TBD	
Jeffrey Energy Center	Pottawatomie County	39°17′11″N 96°07′02″W	2,160	Steam turbine (x3)	1978 (Unit 1 - 720MW); 1980 (Unit 2 - 720MW); 1983 (Unit 3 - 720MW)	TBD (Unit 1); TBD (Unit 2); 2030 (Unit 3)	
La Cygne	Linn County	38°20′53″N 94°38′44″W	1,599	Steam turbine (x2)	1973 (Unit 1 - 873MW); 1977 (Unit 2 - 726MW)	TBD (Unit 1); TBD (Unit 2)	
Lawrence Energy Center	Douglas County	39°00′26″N 95°16′09″W	517	Steam turbine (x2)	1938 (Unit 1); 1952 (Unit 2 - 38MW); 1955 (Unit 3 - 49MW); 1960 (Unit 4 - 114MW); 1971 (Unit 5 - 403MW)	19?? (Unit 1 - closed); 2000 (Unit 2 - closed); 2015 (Unit 3 - closed); 2028 (Unit 4); 2028 (Unit 5 will change to gas fired)	
Nearman Creek	Wyandotte County	39°10′05″N 94°41′51″W	261	Steam turbine	1981	TBD	

=== Natural gas ===
Plant name	Location	Coordinates	Capacity (MW)	Generation type	Year completed	Refs
Anthony	Harper County	37°09′06″N 98°01′52″W	11.1	Reciprocating engine (x3)	1972/1976/1981	
Arkalon Ethanol LLC	Seward County	37°06′38″N 100°48′13″W	3.0	Steam turbine	2008	
Ashland	Clark County	37°11′38″N 99°45′47″W	1.3	Reciprocating engine (x2)	1953/1974	
Augusta Electric Plant No 1	Butler County	37°40′43″N 96°58′19″W	8.5	Reciprocating engine (x5)	1949-1964	
Augusta Electric Plant No 2	Butler County	37°41′10″N 96°57′54″W	20.7	Reciprocating engine (x4)	1968-2005	
Bonanza BioEnergy LLC	Finney County	37°57′31″N 100°50′10″W	2.0	Steam turbine	2008	
Burlingame	Osage County	38°45′18″N 95°50′12″W	4.0	Reciprocating engine (x4)	1963-1980	
Burlington	Coffey County	38°11′36″N 95°45′00″W	5.8	Reciprocating engine (x2)	1955/1983	
Chanute 2	Neosho County	37°41′43″N 95°27′31″W	64.0	Reciprocating engine (x2), simple cycle	1965 (4MW); 2002 (60MW)	
Chanute 3	Neosho County	37°38′15″N 95°28′13″W	20.7	Reciprocating engine (x3)	1985/1986	
Cimarron River	Seward County	37°09′40″N 100°45′43″W	65.0	Steam turbine, simple cycle	1963 (50MW); 1968 (15MW)	
Clay Center	Clay County	39°22′26″N 97°07′38″W	29.7	Steam turbine (x2), reciprocating engine (x6)	1948/1961 (8.0MW); 1958-2005 (21.7MW)	
Clifton	Washington County	39°36′45″N 97°16′40″W	68.0	Simple cycle	1974	
CML&P Generating Facility No. 2	Montgomery County	37°05′35″N 95°35′07″W	56.1	Reciprocating engine (x3)	2017	
Coffeyville	Montgomery County	37°02′14″N 95°36′46″W	30	Steam turbine	1973	
Colby	Thomas County	39°24′11″N 101°02′18″W	16.0	Simple cycle	1970	
East 12th Street	Cowley County	37°14′12″N 96°57′45″W	25.8	Steam turbine	1970	
El Dorado Refinery	Butler County	37°47′34″N 96°52′38″W	38.9	Simple cycle	1996	
Emporia Energy Center	Lyon County	38°26′45″N 96°03′55″W	730.2	Simple cycle (x7)	2008/2009	
Fort Dodge	Ford County	37°43′58″N 99°56′59″W	146.7	Steam turbine	1969	
Garden City	Finney County	37°58′13″N 100°53′44″W	256.3	Simple cycle (x3), steam turbine	1968-1979 (158.4MW); 1973 (97.9MW)	
Gardner Energy Center	Johnson County	38°49′51″N 94°53′25″W	39.2	Simple cycle (x2)	1990	
Girard	Crawford County	37°30′28″N 94°50′21″W	10.8	Reciprocating engine (x4)	1955/1962/1997	
Goodland	Sherman County	39°20′30″N 101°42′19″W	15.4	Reciprocating engine (x7)	1962-1999	
Goodman Energy Center	Ellis County	38°55′49″N 99°21′42″W	103.5	Reciprocating engine (x12)	2008/2016	
Gordon Evans Energy Center	Sedgwick County	37°47′25″N 97°31′18″W	288.9	Simple cycle (x3)	2000/2001	
Great Bend - Sunflower	Barton County	38°24′36″N 98°52′08″W	81.6	Steam turbine	1963	
Hill City	Graham County	39°21′30″N 99°50′30″W	6.9	Reciprocating engine (x6)	1962/1967/1974	
Holton	Jackson County	39°28′25″N 95°43′54″W	6.0	Reciprocating engine (x2)	2001	
Hoisington	Barton County	38°30′47″N 98°46′29″W	13.0	Reciprocating engine (x3)	1961/1966/1981	
Hugoton 2	Stanton County	37°09′51″N 101°20′24″W	0.5	Reciprocating engine	1998	
Hutchinson Energy Center	Reno County	38°05′26″N 97°52′29″W	165.2	Simple cycle (x3)	1974	
Iola	Allen County	37°55′23″N 95°25′32″W	10.0	Reciprocating engine (x2)	1998/2000	
Jameson Energy Center	Finney County	37°57′17″N 100°49′50″W	27.6	Reciprocating engine (x3)	2014	
Kaw	Wyandotte County	39°05′12″N 94°39′05″W	165.7	Steam turbine (x3)	1955/1957/1972	
Kingman Municipal	Kingman County	37°22′59″N 98°04′13″W	1.4	Reciprocating engine (x6)	1962-1993	
McPherson 2	McPherson County	38°21′48″N 97°41′01″W	102.5	Simple cycle (x2)	1973/1979	
McPherson 3	McPherson County	38°23′21″N 97°36′40″W	115.6	Simple cycle	1998	
Meade	Meade County	37°17′07″N 100°19′57″W	5.1	Reciprocating engine (x4)	1951-1972	
Minneapolis, City of	Ottawa County	39°07′10″N 97°42′31″W	6.2	Reciprocating engine (x4)	1955-1972	
Nearman Creek	Wyandotte County	39°10′05″N 94°41′51″W	76.0	Simple cycle	2006	
Osage City	Osage County	38°38′00″N 95°49′40″W	10.1	Reciprocating engine (x7)	1955/2011	
Osawatomie	Miami County	38°31′56″N 94°54′09″W	102.0	Simple cycle	2003	
Osborne	Osborne County	39°26′31″N 98°41′25″W	1.7	Reciprocating engine (x3)	1992/1994	
Ottawa	Franklin County	38°36′56″N 95°16′47″W	30.7	Reciprocating engine (x4), simple cycle	1958-1981 (19.2MW); 1967 (11.5MW)	
Prairie Horizon Agri Energy	Phillips County	39°45′40″N 99°18′21″W	1.7	Steam turbine	2006	
Pratt	Pratt County	37°38′09″N 98°44′36″W	13.0	Steam turbine	1965	
Pratt 2	Pratt County	37°38′08″N 98°44′42″W	15.2	Reciprocating engine (x2)	1994/2004	
Riverton	Cherokee County	37°04′21″N 94°41′55″W	300.2	1x1 combined cycle, simple cycle (x2)	2007/2016 (267.6MW); 1988 (32.6MW)	
Rubart	Grant County	37°33′31″N 101°05′58″W	120.0	Reciprocating engine (x12)	2014	
Russell Downtown	Russell County	38°53′36″N 98°51′25″W	9.4	Reciprocating engine (x3)	1971/1994	
Russell Energy Center	Russell County	38°53′59″N 98°50′22″W	15.0	Simple cycle (x2)	2002	
Sabetha Power Plant	Nemaha County	39°54′18″N 95°48′12″W	4.1	Reciprocating engine	2001	
Sharon Springs, City of	Wallace County	38°53′26″N 101°45′05″W	3.0	Reciprocating engine (x4)	1951-1970	
Stockton	Rooks County	39°26′10″N 99°16′40″W	5.0	Reciprocating engine (x5)	1951-1971	
Wamego	Pottawatomie County	39°11′57″N 96°18′31″W	15.2	Reciprocating engine (x9)	1956-2016	
Wellington 1	Sumner County	37°15′41″N 97°24′21″W	19.5	Steam turbine	1972	
Wellington 2	Sumner County	37°16′04″N 97°20′59″W	21.0	Simple cycle	1989	
West 14th Street	Cowley County	37°14′07″N 97°00′40″W	11.0	Simple cycle	1962	
West Gardner	Johnson County	38°47′15″N 94°59′10″W	408.0	Simple cycle (x4)	2003	
Wichita Plant	Sedgwick County	37°34′53″N 97°25′27″W	43.7	Simple cycle	1982	

=== Petroleum ===
Plant name	Location	Coordinates	Capacity (MW)	Technology	Year completed	Refs
Ashland	Clark County	37°11′38″N 99°45′47″W	3.6	Petroleum liquids^{[A]}	1963/1971/2014	
Augusta Electric Plant No 1	Butler County	37°40′43″N 96°58′19″W	3	Petroleum liquids^{[A]}	1929/1939/2016	
Baldwin City Plant No 1	Douglas County	38°46′28″N 95°11′12″W	4.2	Petroleum liquids	1965/1970	
Baldwin City Plant No 2	Douglas County	38°45′54″N 95°11′34″W	6.4	Petroleum liquids	2004	
Belleville	Republic County	39°49′58″N 97°37′55″W	14.3	Petroleum liquids	1955-2007	
Beloit	Mitchell County	39°27′28″N 98°06′44″W	16.6	Petroleum liquids	1950-1980	
Bird City	Cheyenne County	39°45′29″N 101°31′55″W	4	Petroleum liquids	1965/1966	
Burlington	Coffey County	38°11′36″N 95°45′00″W	5.6	Petroleum Liquids^{[A]}	1962/2003/2005	
Chanute 3	Neosho County	37°38′15″N 95°28′13″W	11.4	Petroleum liquids^{[A]}	1991	
Clifton	Washington County	39°36′45″N 97°16′40″W	2.5	Petroleum liquids^{[A]}	1974	
Coffeyville	Montgomery County	37°02′14″N 95°36′46″W	2.5	Petroleum liquids^{[A]}	2007	
Colby, City of	Thomas County	39°23′40″N 101°03′30″W	14.7	Petroleum liquids	1958-2019	
East 12th Street	Cowley County	37°14′12″N 96°57′45″W	1.6	Petroleum liquids^{[A]}	2002	
Ellinwood	Barton County	38°21′16″N 98°35′00″W	7.2	Petroleum liquids	1948-1971	
Erie	Neosho County	37°34′00″N 95°14′15″W	4.3	Petroleum liquids	1958/2005	
Erie Energy Center	Neosho County	37°34′27″N 95°14′14″W	20	Petroleum liquids	1999	
Garnett Municipal	Anderson County	38°16′11″N 95°14′41″W	11.7	Petroleum liquids	1930-2000	
Goodland	Sherman County	39°20′30″N 101°42′19″W	0.7	Petroleum liquids^{[A]}	1939	
Gordon Evans Energy Center	Sedgwick County	37°47′25″N 97°31′18″W	3	Petroleum liquids^{[A]}	1969	
Herington	Dickinson County	38°39′57″N 96°56′57″W	1.6	Petroleum liquids	2001	
Hoisington	Barton County	38°30′47″N 98°46′29″W	1.1	Petroleum liquids^{[A]}	1996	
Holton	Jackson County	39°28′25″N 95°43′54″W	13.4	Petroleum liquids	1958-1994	
Hugoton 2	Stanton County	37°09′51″N 101°20′24″W	16.8	Petroleum liquids^{[A]}	1964-1997	
Hutchinson Energy Center	Reno County	38°05′26″N 97°52′29″W	61.4	Petroleum liquids^{[A]}	1975/1983	
Iola	Allen County	37°55′23″N 95°25′32″W	14.5	Petroleum liquids	1969-1981	
Jetmore	Hodgeman County	38°04′49″N 99°53′37″W	2.5	Petroleum liquids	2015	
Johnson	Stanton County	37°34′01″N 101°45′04″W	20	Petroleum liquids	2017	
La Crosse	Rush County	38°31′54″N 99°18′30″W	5.5	Petroleum liquids	1962-1975	
Larned	Pawnee County	38°10′34″N 99°06′00″W	16.0	Petroleum liquids	1976/2004	
Lincoln	Lincoln County	39°02′14″N 98°09′11″W	10	Petroleum liquids	1958-2017	
McPherson 2	McPherson County	38°21′48″N 97°41′00″W	102.5	Petroleum liquids^{[A]}	1976	
Meade	Meade County	37°17′07″N 100°19′57″W	1.5	Petroleum liquids^{[A]}	1965	
Minneapolis, City of	Ottawa County	39°07′10″N 97°42′31″W	1.8	Petroleum liquids^{[A]}	1989	
Mulvane 2	Sedgwick County	37°29′27″N 97°13′18″W	8.6	Petroleum liquids	2003	
Oberlin	Decatur County	39°49′18″N 100°31′44″W	5.2	Petroleum liquids	1954-1973	
Osage City	Osage County	38°38′00″N 95°49′40″W	1.4	Petroleum liquids^{[A]}	2001	
Osawatomie City of	Miami County	38°30′06″N 94°57′36″W	6.6	Petroleum liquids	1950-1966	
Osawatomie Power Plant North Sub	Miami County	38°30′05″N 94°57′25″W	6	Petroleum liquids	2018	
Osawatomie Power Plant South Sub	Miami County	38°29′44″N 94°57′09″W	6	Petroleum liquids	2017	
Osborne	Osborne County	39°26′31″N 98°41′25″W	3.2	Petroleum liquids^{[A]}	1957/1963/1967	
Oxford	Sumner County	37°16′33″N 97°09′49″W	4.8	Petroleum liquids	1999/2007	
Pratt	Pratt County	37°38′09″N 98°44′36″W	1.5	Petroleum liquids^{[A]}	1958	
Quindaro	Wyandotte County	39°08′57″N 94°38′17″W	131.4	Petroleum liquids	1974/1977	
Russell Downtown	Russell County	38°53′36″N 98°51′25″W	5	Petroleum liquids^{[A]}	1978/1981	
Sabetha Power Plant	Nemaha County	39°54′18″N 95°48′12″W	14.6	Petroleum liquids^{[A]}	1947-1992	
St Francis	Cheyenne County	39°46′15″N 101°48′36″W	5.1	Petroleum liquids	1953/1964/1972	
St John	Stafford County	37°59′43″N 98°45′37″W	5.0	Petroleum liquids	1965/1982/2002	
Sharpe	Coffey County	38°16′30″N 95°41′02″W	20	Petroleum liquids	2002	
Stafford	Stafford County	37°57′22″N 98°35′57″W	2.5	Petroleum liquids	1973/1983	
Sterling	Rice County	38°12′51″N 98°12′26″W	10.3	Petroleum liquids	1950/2002	
Thunderbird Generator (Tbird)	Lyon County	38°28′08″N 96°15′13″W	1.0	Petroleum liquids	2019	
Washington	Washington County	39°43′50″N 96°58′46″W	8.9	Petroleum liquids	1953-1986	
Waste Water Plant Generator	Cowley County	37°13′40″N 96°59′23″W	1.6	Petroleum liquids	1993	
Wellington 1	Sumner County	37°15′41″N 97°24′21″W	4	Petroleum liquids^{[A]}	2004	

^{A} Multi-fuel plant, listed is "total net summer capacity" by source.

== Renewable power stations ==
Data reported by U.S. Energy Information Administration

=== Biomass ===
Plant name	Location	Coordinates	Capacity (MW)	Fuel	Generation type	Year opened	Refs
East Kansas Agri-Energy	Anderson County	38°16′21″N 95°14′25″W	2.0	Biofuel/ethanol	Steam turbine	2005	
Oak Grove Power Producers	Crawford County	37°37′47″N 94°38′29″W	3.6	Landfill gas	Reciprocating engine (x2)	2010/2013	
Waste Management Rolling Meadows LFGTE	Shawnee County	39°10′29″N 95°43′52″W	5.6	Landfill gas	Reciprocating engine (x7)	2010	

=== Geothermal ===
There were no utility-scale geothermal power facilities in the state of Kansas in 2019.

=== Hydroelectric ===
Plant name	Location	Coordinates	Capacity (MW)	Number of turbines	Year opened	Refs
Kansas River Project (Bowersock Mills)	Douglas County	38°58′26″N 95°14′06″W	7.0	11	1920-1925/2012	

=== Solar ===
Plant	Location	Coordinates	Capacity (MW_{AC})	Year opened	Technology	Refs
BEC Leonardville Solar Farm	Riley County	39°21′43″N 96°55′36″W	0.750	2023	Photovoltaic	
BEC St. George Solar Farm	Pottawatomie County	39°14′02″N 96°27′20″W	1.0	2023	Photovoltaic	
BPU Solar Farm	Wyandotte County	39°09′59″N 94°41′49″W	1.0	2017	Photovoltaic	
City of Pratt Solar	Pratt County	37°42′38″N 98°43′15″W	6.0	2019	Photovoltaic	
Johnson Corner Solar 1	Stanton County	37°32′56″N 101°47′46″W	20.0	2020	Photovoltaic	
Midwest Energy Community Solar Array	Thomas County	39°24′25″N 101°02′22″W	1.0	2015	Photovoltaic	
Prairie Sky Solar Farm	Butler County	37°45′06″N 97°04′28″W	1.0	2017	Photovoltaic	
Westar Cities Solar	Reno County	38°01′10″N 97°58′31″W	1.2	2017	Photovoltaic	

=== Wind ===
Additional data reported by the United States Wind Turbine Database
Plant	Location	Coordinates	Capacity (MW)	Number of turbines	Year opened	Refs
Alexander Wind Farm	Rush County	38°25′29″N 99°30′27″W	50.7	21	2015	
Buckeye Wind Energy Center	Ellis County	39°00′14″N 99°24′51″W	205.7	112	2015	
Buffalo Dunes Wind Project	Grant County; Haskell County	37°37′15″N 101°04′34″W	249.8	135	2013	
Caney River Wind Project	Elk County	37°27′36″N 96°25′12″W	200.0	111	2011	
Cedar Bluff Wind	Ness County	38°41′51″N 99°43′45″W	198.6	111	2015	
Central Plains Wind Farm	Wichita County	38°30′12″N 101°09′41″W	99.0	33	2009	
Cimarron Bend Wind Farm (I, II & III)	Clark County	37°21′18″N 99°59′28″W	599.0	274	2016/2017/ 2020	
Cimarron Wind (I&II)	Gray County	37°52′26″N 100°16′49″W	296.6	129	2012	
Cloud County Wind Farm	Cloud County	39°26′15″N 97°39′52″W	201.0	67	2008	
CP Bloom Wind	Ford County	37°29′11″N 99°55′29″W	178.2	54	2017	
Diamond Vista Wind Project	Marion County	38°33′56″N 97°02′26″W	299.3	95	2019	
Elk River Wind	Butler County	37°34′47″N 96°33′01″W	150.0	100	2005	
Ensign Wind	Gray County	37°36′52″N 100°16′43″W	98.9	43	2012	
Flat Ridge Wind Farm (I&II)	Barber County; Kingman County	37°21′59″N 98°15′40″W	570.1	344	2009/2012	
Fort Hays State University Wind Farm	Ellis County	38°52′27″N 99°24′19″W	4.0	2	2013	
Gray County Wind Energy	Gray County	37°36′48″N 100°22′42″W	112.0	170	2001	
Greensburg	Kiowa County	37°33′00″N 99°20′40″W	12.5	10	2010	
Ironwood Wind	Ford County	37°49′06″N 99°46′31″W	167.9	73	2012	
Kingman Wind	Pratt County	37°35′12″N 98°34′45″W	214.8	120	2016	
Marshall Wind Farm	Marshall County	39°42′04″N 96°21′39″W	73.8	36	2016	
Ninnescah Wind Energy	Pratt County	37°35′12″N 98°34′45″W	208.3	121	2016	
Post Rock Wind Power Project	Ellsworth County	38°50′30″N 98°17′58″W	201.0	134	2012	
Prairie Queen Wind Farm	Allen County	37°58′44″N 95°13′28″W	199.3	75	2019	
Pratt Wind	Pratt County	37°33′00″N 98°48′00″W	243.5	88	2018	
Shooting Star	Kiowa County	37°31′08″N 99°26′47″W	104.0	65	2012	
Slate Creek Wind Project	Sumner County	37°06′53″N 97°14′15″W	150.0	75	2015	
Smoky Hills Wind Farm (I&II)	Lincoln County	38°52′48″N 98°09′37″W	249.3	155	2008	
Solomon Forks Wind Project	Thomas County	39°18′22″N 101°04′28″W	275.6	105	2019	
Spearville (I, II & III)	Ford County	37°51′51″N 99°45′10″W	256.5	162	2006/2010/ 2012	
Waverly Wind Farm	Coffey County	38°15′25″N 95°48′51″W	199.0	95	2016	
Western Plains Wind Farm	Ford County	37°51′17″N 99°40′47″W	280.6	122	2017	

== Storage power stations ==
Data reported by U.S. Energy Information Administration

=== Battery storage ===
There were no utility-scale battery storage facilities in the state of Kansas in 2019.

=== Pumped storage ===
There were no utility-scale pumped storage facilities in the state of Kansas in 2019.

== See also ==
- List of power stations in the United States
- List of wind farms in the United States
