= Solar power in Kansas =

Overview of solar power in the U.S. state of Kansas

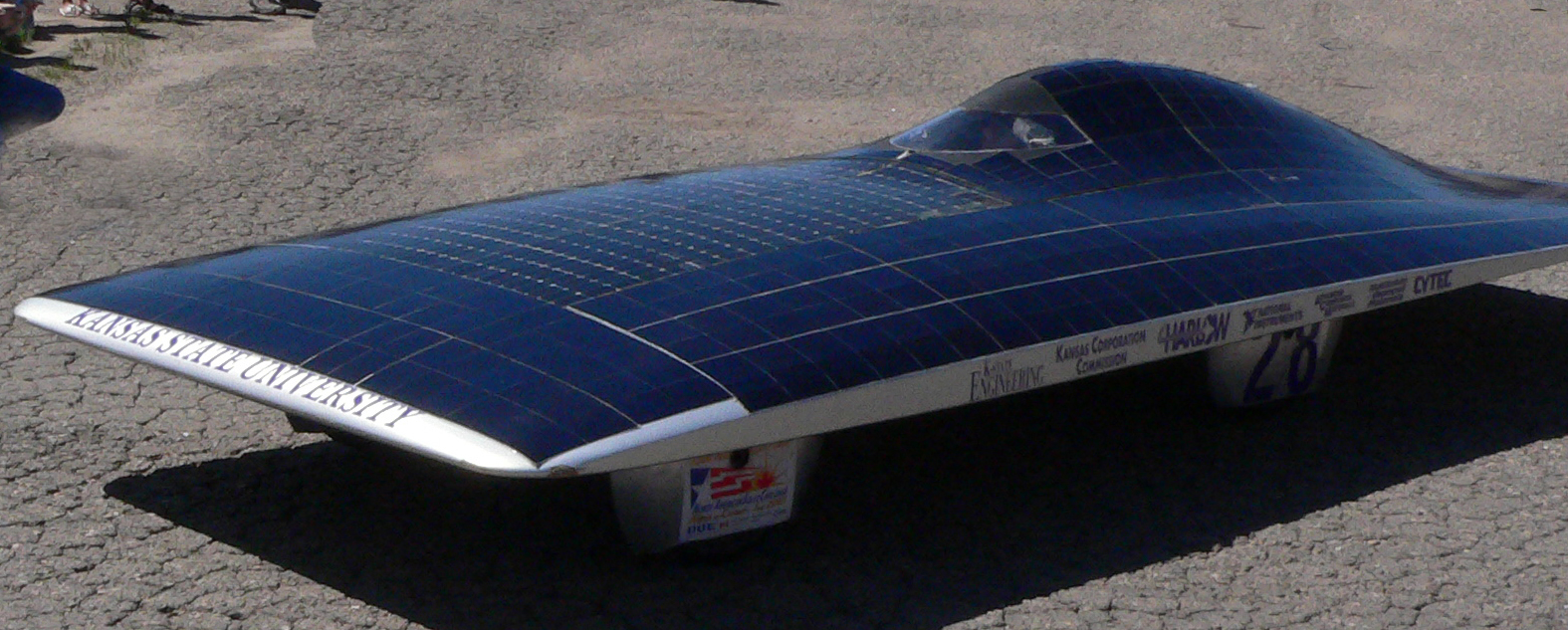
Solar car developed by Kansas State University

Solar power in Kansas has been growing in recent years due to new technological improvements and a variety of regulatory actions and financial incentives.

It is estimated that 41.7% of electricity in Kansas could be provided by 12,500 MW of rooftop solar panels.

In 2015, IKEA installed the largest solar array in the state, 730 kW on the roof of its store in Merriam. In 2011, Kansas's largest solar array, 118 kW, was the rooftop installation at Peeper Ranch in Lenexa. Its output is available online.

== Net metering ==
The state's net metering program allows residential installations of up to 25 kW and 200 kW non-residential on-site electrical generation to roll over any excess generation to the next month, but any excess at the end of the year is lost. Participation is limited to 1% of utility's previous year peak demand. Many of the states have net metering policies that are inadequate for 100% renewable energy. Kansas was given a C for net metering and an F for interconnection policies.

== Plug-in Solar ==
As of 2026, Kansas has yet to legalize plug-in solar.

== HOA restrictions ==
As of 2026, Kansas does not have any regulations preventing homeowners associations from arbitrarily restricting residential rooftop solar. Several bills have been proposed to remedy this, however none have been passed.

== Local restrictions ==
As of 2026, several counties have moratoriums or outright bans on commercial solar development for a variety of reasons, real or perceived. These include moratoriums in Jefferson County and Wabaunsee County, and an outright ban in McPherson County.

== Statistics ==
Source: NREL

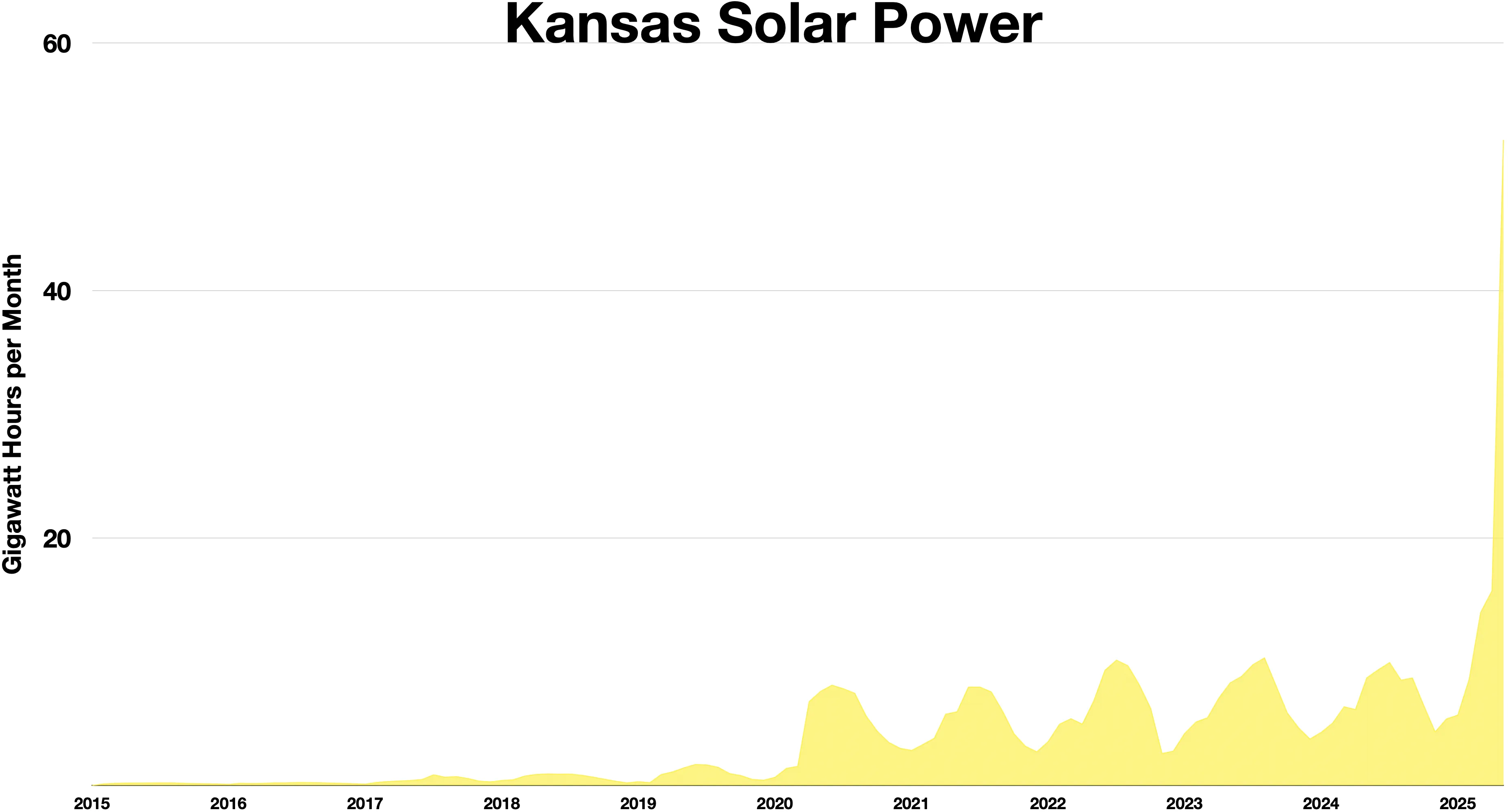
Kansas solar power from 2015 to 2025

Grid-connected PV capacity (MWp)
Year	Capacity	Change	% change
2010	0.1	0.1	>100%
2011	0.2	0.1	100%
2012	0.5	0.3	150%
2013	1.1	0.6	120%
2014	2.3	1.2	109%
2015	4.7	2.4	104%
2016	5.9	1.2	26%
2017	14.9	9	153%
2018	21.9	7	47%
2019	46.7	24.8	113%
2020	81.9	35.2	75%
2021	99.1	17.2	21%
2022	115	15.9	16%
2023	125	10	9%
2024	163	38	30%
2025	292	129	79%
2026	471	179	61%

Utility-scale solar generation in Kansas (GWh)
Year	Total	Jan	Feb	Mar	Apr	May	Jun	Jul	Aug	Sep	Oct	Nov	Dec
2017	4	0	0	0	0	0	0	1	1	1	1	0	0
2018	7	0	0	1	1	1	1	1	1	1	0	0	0
2019	10	0	0	1	1	1	2	2	1	1	1	0	0
2020	56	0	0	0	7	8	8	8	7	6	5	4	3
2021	62	3	3	4	6	6	8	8	7	6	4	4	3
2022	67	3	5	5	5	6	8	9	8	7	6	3	3

== See also ==
- List of power stations in Kansas
- Wind power in Kansas
- Solar power in the United States
- Renewable energy in the United States
