= Cimarron Bend Wind Farm =

Wind farm in Kansas, U.S.

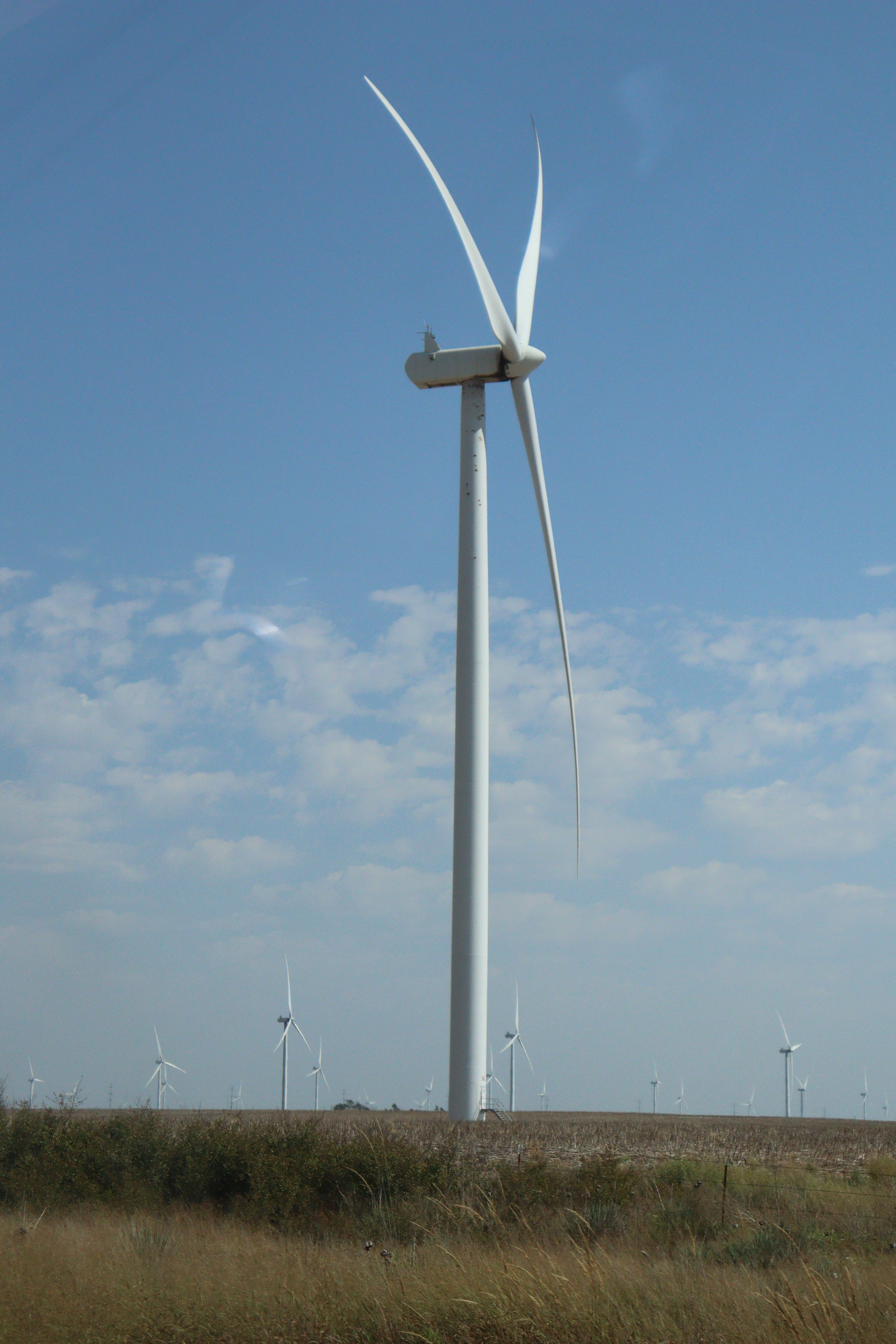
- Official name: Cimarron Bend Wind Farm
- Country: United States
- Location: Clark County, Kansas
- Coordinates: 37°21′18″N 99°59′28″W
- Construction began: April 2016
- Commission date: March 2017
- Construction cost: $610 million (I&II)
- Owner: Enel Green Power
- Operator: Enel Green Power

Wind farm
- Type: Onshore

Power generation
- Units operational: 274 turbines
- Make and model: 200 Vestas V110-2.0 MW; 74 -2.69 MW
- Nameplate capacity: 599 MW
- Capacity factor: 49.8% (average 2018-2020)
- Annual net output: 2,560 GW·h

The Cimarron Bend Wind Farm is a 599 megawatt (MW) wind farm spanning northwest Clark County in the U.S. state of Kansas. It became the second largest wind generating facility in the state upon completion of the first two construction phases in early 2017. The facility allowed the Kansas City Board of Public Utilities (BPU) to obtain more than 45% of its electricity needs from renewable sources.

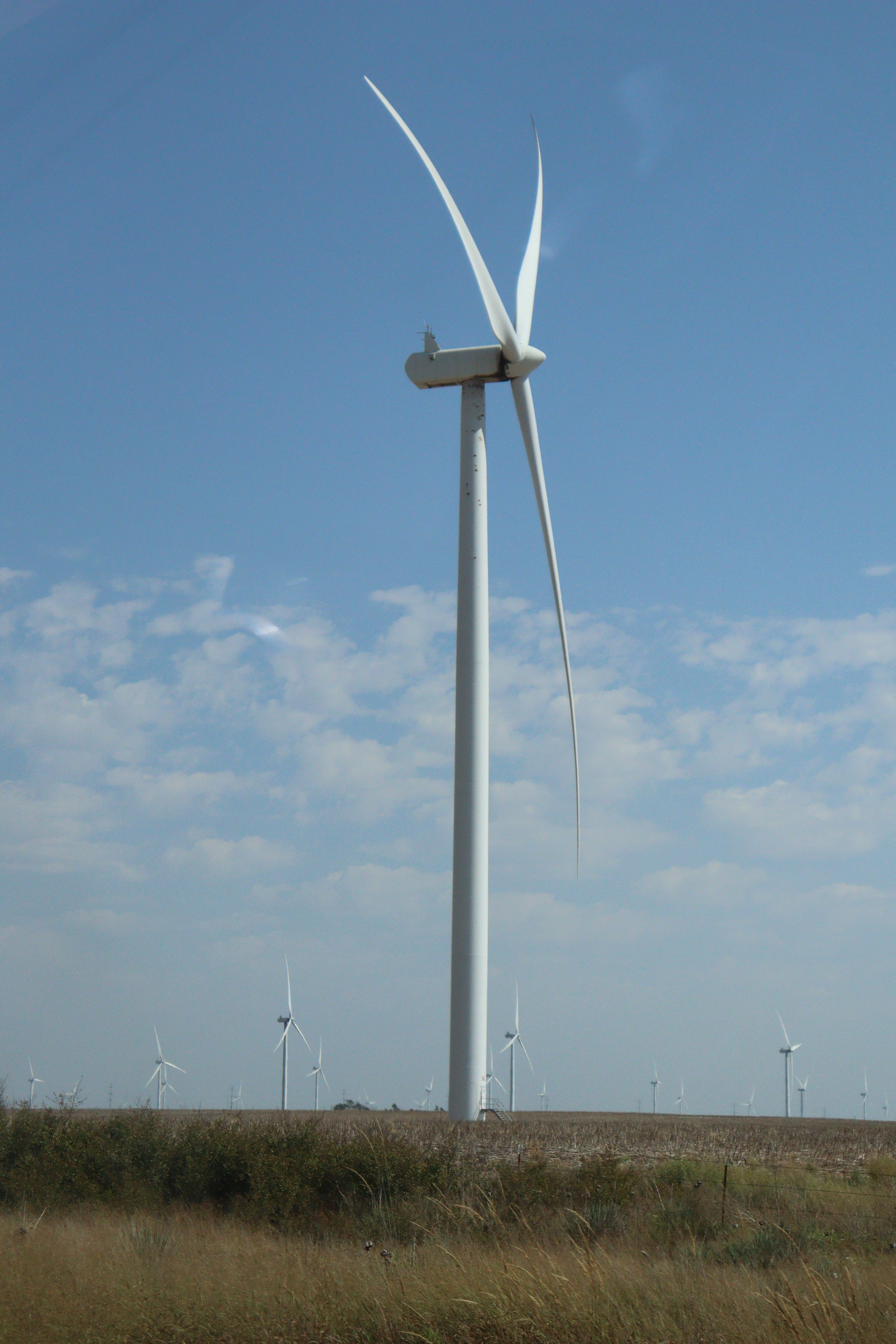
A wind turbine at the Cimarron Bend Wind Farm

== Details ==
The project was developed by the Kansas-based firm Tradewind Energy, which previously built a strategic partnership with the Italian-controlled firm Enel Green Power North America (EGPNA) that resulted in the construction of several wind farms throughout the state, including the Smoky Hills Wind Farm. The electricity and tax credits from the first 200 MW phase are contracted with Google Inc., and those from the second 200 MW phase are contracted with the Kansas City BPU. A third 200 MW phase was also planned for development.

The facility's first two phases span about 60,000 acres of farm and grazing land in the southwest region of the state near the town of Minneola. It includes 200 Vestas V110-2.0 MW wind turbines for which many components were manufactured in Colorado. Construction of the facility started in April 2016 and employed about 350 local workers. Phase I was completed year end 2016 and phase II in late March 2017. The ongoing operation and maintenance activities employ about 15 people.

Construction was financed by Enel Green Power North America Renewable Energy Partners, an equally owned joint venture between EGPNA and GE Capital’s Energy Financial Services. EGPNA obtained further investor financing through tax equity agreements with other U.S. financial institutions including Bank of America, Merrill Lynch, J.P. Morgan Chase, and MetLife.

In early 2019, EGPNA acquired Tradewind Energy and its portfolio of future projects under development. It also purchased GE's interest in their joint venture facilities, including the operating Cimmaron Bend Wind Farm.

The facility was expanded to 599 MW in 2020, making it EGPNA's largest US wind farm.

== Electricity production ==
Cimarron Bend Wind Electricity Generation (MW·h)
Year	Cimarron Bend I (200 MW)	Cimarron Bend II (200 MW)	Cimarron Bend III (199 MW)	Total Annual MW·h
2017	796,118	727,592*	-	1,523,710
2018	787,258	877,905	-	1,665,163
2019	870,347	888,076	-	1,758,423
2020	901,692	908,455	-	1,810,147
Average Annual Production (years 2018–2020) --->				1,744,578
Average Capacity Factor (years 2018–2020) --->				49.8%

(*) partial year of operation
(NR) not yet reported

== See also ==
- Wind power in Kansas
- List of wind farms in the United States
