= Bowersock Dam =

Hydroelectric dam in Lawrence, Kansas

Coordinates: 38.9753°N 95.2353°W

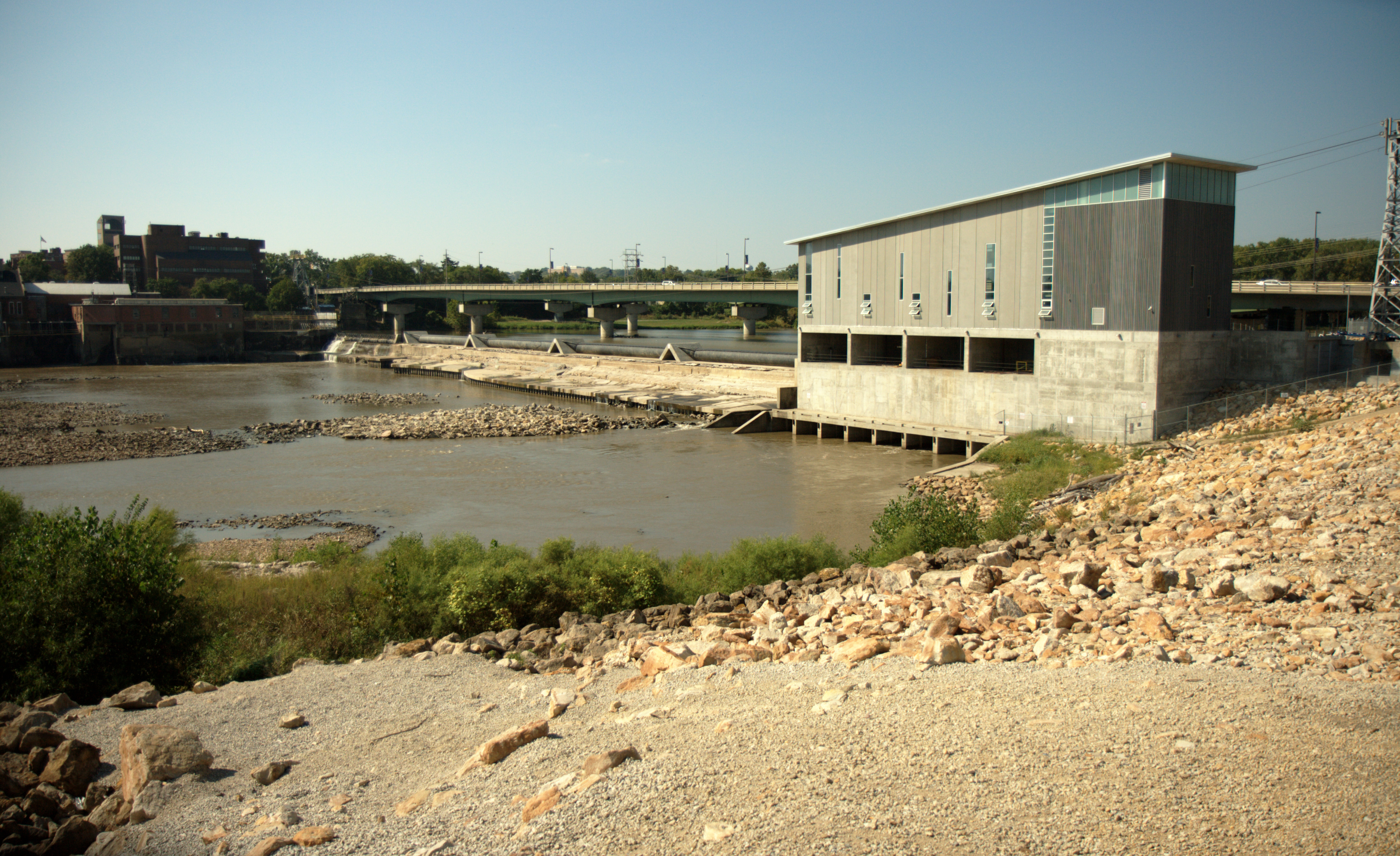
Bowersock Dam from the Northeast

The Bowersock Dam is a run-of-river dam on the Kansas River in Lawrence, Kansas. Constructed in 1874 to provide mechanical power, it now supports the only hydroelectric power plant in the state of Kansas. The dam, which is 655 feet long and approximately 17.08 feet tall, supplies water to two hydroelectric powerhouses, which have a combined installed capacity of seven megawatts. It impounds a 423-acre reservoir, which is used for recreation and as a water source for one of Lawrence's water treatment plants.

== History ==
For the first two decades after Lawrence's founding in 1854, the city's only sources of energy were wood and imported fuel. By the late 1860s, however, limited local timber resources had been depleted, and the city faced an energy crisis. Looking to emulate the success of eastern water-driven industrial cities like Lowell, Massachusetts, local leaders entertained plans to build a stone dam across the Kansas River. The city of Lawrence contracted with engineer Orlando Darling, who founded the Lawrence Land and Water Company (LL&W Co.) to manage the project.

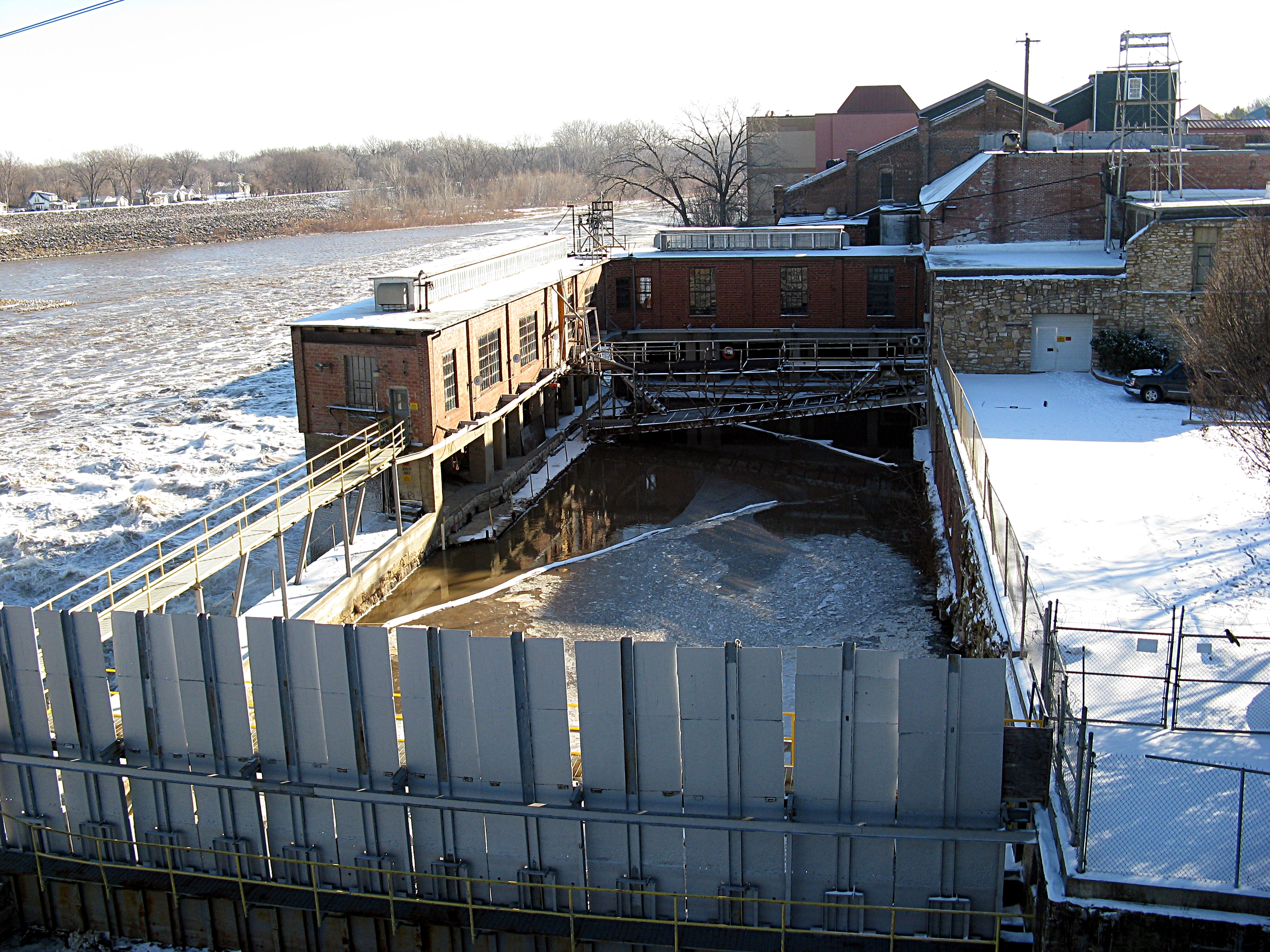
South powerhouse from the Kansas River bridge

Due to structural problems and flood damage, including a destructive ice jam flood in 1873, Darling was unable to fulfill the terms of his contract with the city and resigned his position before the dam could be completed. Although LL&W Co. completed the structure without Darling, floods and slow development continued to plague the company, and it went into receivership in 1878. The property was then purchased by James H. Gower, who conferred it upon his son in law, Justin De Witt Bowersock. Apart from a small break in 1885, the dam withstood floods under Bowersock's leadership, and water power fueled substantial industrial growth in Lawrence in the late 19th century.

After another ice jam severely damaged the original water mill in 1888, Bowersock improved the structure and installed four dynamos, which introduced electricity to Lawrence for the first time. After a severe flood in 1903 destroyed the original mill, Bowersock constructed a new powerhouse designed primarily to generate hydroelectricity, although some businesses in Lawrence still used mechanical waterpower until 1972. While electricity produced by the dam was initially directly distributed in Lawrence, the current operator of the dam, Bowersock Mills and Power Company (BMPC), sells power to the Kansas City Board of Public Utilities.

Later in the 20th century, changes in electrical infrastructure led to decreased demand for hydroelectric power from the dam, and the structure fell on hard times until a 1977 agreement between the BMPC and the city of Lawrence conferred responsibility for dam maintenance on the city. In 2011, BMPC broke ground on a new powerhouse on the north end of the dam, substantially increasing its power output. The new north powerhouse was completed in 2013 and increased the plant's capacity to 7MW.
