= Gray County Wind Farm =

Wind farm in Kansas, United States

Coordinates: 37°36′22″N 100°22′46″W

Gray County Wind Farm near Montezuma, Kansas, was the largest wind farm in Kansas and the largest in the United States not mandated by a state regulatory commission back in 2001. The site consists of 170 Vestas V-47 wind turbines with a total nameplate capacity of 112 MW. Each turbine tower is 217 feet high, with blades 77 feet long, and a generating capacity of 660 kW. Owned and operated by NextEra Energy Resources, Gray County Wind Farm became fully operational in November 2001. Its construction cost an estimated $100 million. The average wind speed at the site is approximately 20 mph. The area is primarily used for farmland.

== See also ==
- Elk River Wind Project
- Smoky Hills Wind Farm
