= Kansas City Board of Public Utilities =

Utilities company in Kansas City, Kansas, US

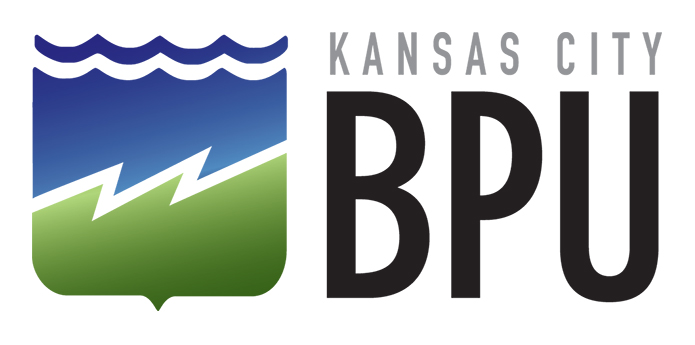
- Company type: Not-for-Profit; Public Utility
- Industry: Electric Utility; Water supply
- Founded: 1909
- Headquarters: Kansas City, Kansas, United States
- Products: Electricity; Water
- Number of employees: 600+ (2016)

The Kansas City Board of Public Utilities (BPU) is a publicly owned, not-for-profit public utility servicing Wyandotte County that is headquartered in Kansas City, Kansas. Overall, BPU provides service to 127.5 square miles of Wyandotte County. Electric services are provided within the Kansas City, Kansas (KCK) area, and water is supplied to KCK, as well as portions of suburban Wyandotte, Leavenworth, and Johnson counties.

BPU is a publicly owned administrative agency of the Unified Government of Wyandotte County/Kansas City, Kansas (UG), and is self-governed by an elected six-member board of directors.

== History ==
In 1909, the citizens of Kansas City, Kansas, authorized the purchase of a privately owned water system to provide the community with better water service. The electric utility was placed in operation in late 1912. Today, BPU operates as a not-for-profit municipal utility and is an administrative arm of the Unified Government of Wyandotte County, Kansas City, Kansas. It is self-governed, with an elected six-member board of directors.

== Energy generation ==
BPU electric plants and delivery systems serve nearly 65,000 customers over 127.5 square miles within the Kansas City, Kansas, area. Power generation facilities consist of three power stations, 29 substations and over 3,100 miles of electrical lines. The Nearman Creek Power Station has a capacity of 315 MW, the Quindaro Power Station can produce 316 MW, and the Kaw Power Station, which is currently inactive, was capable of producing 92 MW.

Energy Generation Facilities include:

- Nearman Creek Power Station
- Quindaro Power Station
- Dogwood Natural Gas Energy Facility
- Smoky Hills Wind Farm
- Alexander Wind Farm
- Cimarron Bend Wind Farm
- Bowersock Hydropower Plant
- Oak Grove Landfill Project
- Community Solar FarmIn 2014 BPU signed a 20-year power purchase agreement for approximately 50% of the wind energy produced at the Alexander Wind Farm in Alexander, Kansas. In April 2016, BPU announced a partnership with Google and Trade Wind Partners to purchase power from the Cimarron Bend Wind Project.

== Water services ==
BPU operates the Nearman Water Treatment Plant in Kansas City, Kansas, serving over 51,000 residents with clean water. Nearman is, in part, notable for two of the nation's largest horizontal collector wells, 1,000 miles of water pipes and three major pump stations. Going 135 feet deep, the horizontal collector is capable of bringing in 54-mgd (millions of gallons per day) of raw water from an underground aquifer.

Once in the horizontal collector, the raw water is then pumped up to the plant where it goes through a complex treatment process that includes six dual-media filtration basins and on-site water-quality testing for turbidity, pH balance, and temperature.

In late 2016, renovations to the facility included valve, hydrant, and customer leak detection programs, water treatment filter upgrades, distribution facility maintenance, water main replacement projects, and a four-million-gallon water reservoir.

== Awards and recognition ==
Also in 2016, BPU was awarded a Directors Award by the American Water Works Association for its water treatment operations. This award is granted to utilities that demonstrate an outstanding commitment to delivering superior quality drinking water.

Outside of the operating awards received, BPU was also recognized in 2016 for the American Public Power Association (APPA) Community Service Award. This award is given to companies who have demonstrated “good neighbor” commitment to the community. BPU won the award for efforts in volunteering, donations, environmental advocacy, and civic leadership.

BPU has received the Reliable Public Power Provider award from the American Public Power Association (APPA).

== See also ==
- Wyandotte County, Kansas
- Kansas City, Kansas
- Johnson County, Kansas
- Wind power in Kansas
- List of power stations in the United States
