= Elk River Wind Project =

Wind farm in Butler County, Kansas

Coordinates: 37.658079°N 96.532793°W

The Elk River Wind Project is a 150 megawatt wind farm near Beaumont in Butler County, Kansas. The Elk River Project subsidiary is owned by PPM Energy and the project has been operating since 2005.

Empire District Electric selected Elk River, and signed a twenty-year agreement with PPM Energy to purchase wind energy from the farm.

== See also ==
- Smoky Hills Wind Farm
