= Wind power in Kansas =

Electricity from wind in one U.S. state

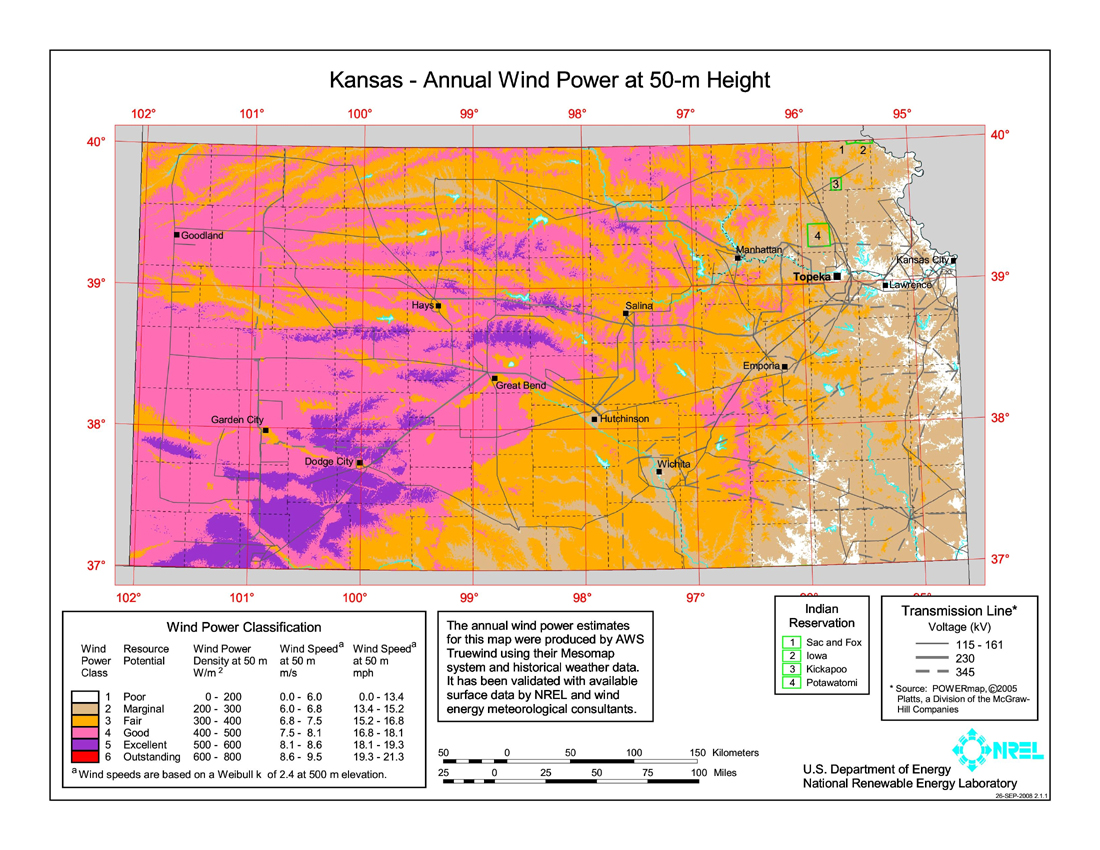
Kansas wind resources

In the U.S. state of Kansas, wind power is the largest source of electricity, generating over 47% of the state's electricity in 2022. Kansas has a high potential capacity for wind power, second behind Texas. The most recent estimates (2012) are that Kansas has a potential for 952 GW of wind power capacity, yet had only about 5.6 GW installed by the end of 2018. Kansas could generate 3,102 TW·h of electricity each year, which represents over 75% of all the electricity generated in the United States in 2011. This electricity could be worth $290 billion per year (at 9.35 cents per kW·h).

== Growth ==
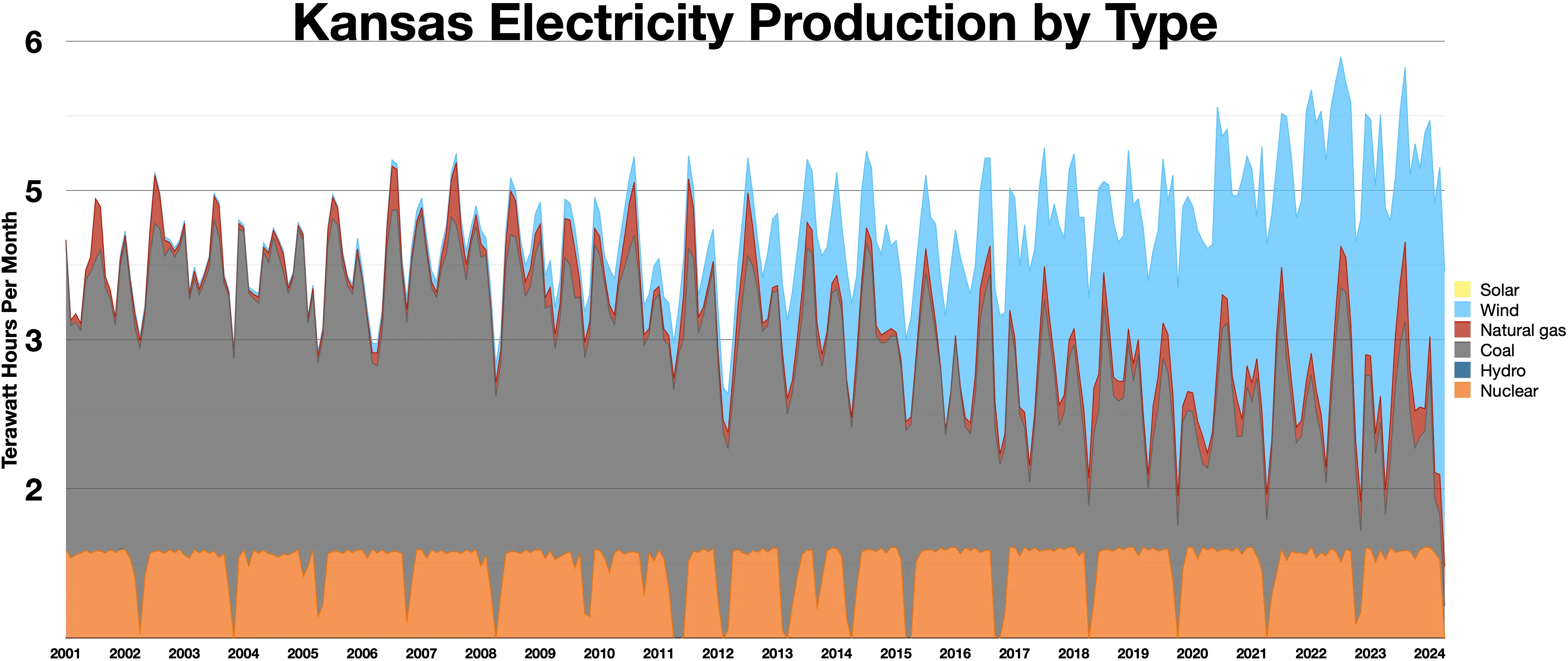
Kansas electricity production by type

Year	Capacity (MW)	
Year	Kansas	US
1999	1.5	2,472
2000	1.5	2,539
2001	113.7	4,232
2002	113.7	4,687
2003	113.7	6,350
2004	113.7	6,723
2005	263.7	9,147
2006	364.2	11,575
2007	364.2	16,907
2008	921	25,410
2009	1,021	34,863
2010	1,074	40,267
2011	1,274	46,916
2012	2,713	60,005
2013	2,967	61,107
2014	2,967	65,880
2015	3,766	74,471
2016	4,451	82,171
2017	5,110	89,078
2018	5,653	96,487
2019	6,128	105,583
2020	7,016	122,478
2021	8,245	135,843

Kansas led the nation in the early 2000s in all measured categories of scaling up renewable electricity generation, with an overall growth in generation of 1,678.5% from 2001 to 2007. This rapid overall growth in renewable energy generation represents an equally large increase of 1,487.9%, as a percent of total state electricity generation. Massive increases in generation are largely the product of wind energy development across the state. In 2001, Kansas had 114 Megawatts (MW) of wind energy generation. By the end of 2011, Kansas had installed 1,224 MW of generation. Wind energy generation in Kansas grew 2,793.5% from 2001 to 2007. This amounts to an average growth of slightly over 75% per year.

== Potential ==
Being centrally located in the midwest, Kansas is squarely placed in the center of America’s wind tunnel, a corridor stretching from North Dakota south into the Texas panhandle, where the vast majority of the nation’s best on-shore wind resources are located. Kansas has the 2nd highest wind potential in the U.S. with an estimated over 952,000 MW possible capacity, capable of generating over 3,101,576 GWh. Texas has the largest wind potential.

With a projected total state peak load of 10,000 MW, Kansas could become a major wind energy exporting state to the south and the east U.S., where renewable generation opportunities are much more constrained.

The Department of Energy’s National Renewable Energy Lab (NREL) projects that if Kansas were to develop 7,158 MW of new wind by 2030 the economic impact for Kansas would total over $7.8 billion in benefit to local economies, landowners, and job creation, creating over 26,000 new jobs.

In 2007, Kansas Governor Sebelius noted in her State of the State address that “our goal is to produce 10 percent of our state’s electricity from wind power by 2010, and 20 percent by 2020.”

Wind power accounted for 19.4% of the electricity generated in Kansas during 2013. By 2016 it accounted for 29.6%. In 2018 it reached 36%, a higher percentage than any other U.S. state. In 2019 it comprised 41.45%, and in 2022, 47.13%.

== Economic benefits ==
Forecasts indicate that for every 1,000 MW of wind developed in Kansas, cumulative economic benefits will be $1.08 billion, with annual CO_{2} reduction estimated at 3.2 million tons, and annual water savings at 1,816 million gallons. These projected benefits could be greatly increased by developing more localized manufacturing, installation, supply and maintenance industry within the State. In the 6 years leading up to 2008, Kansas lost 10,944 manufacturing jobs totaling 6% of the manufacturing workforce. It is estimated that the potential manufacturing benefit for Kansas lies mostly in the southeastern part of the state. Up to 2008, southeastern Kansas experienced the majority of high unemployment rates in the state (i.e., >6%).

== Education ==
Cloud County Community College has a wind energy technology program in Concordia. CCCC is the only college in the state of Kansas with an AWEA-certified wind energy program and only one of seven in the entire United States. They are located just two miles north of the Meridian Way wind farm.

== Wind generation ==
Generation from wind power in 2017 was 36 percent of generation in Kansas.

Kansas wind generation (GWh, million kWh)
Year	Total	Jan	Feb	Mar	Apr	May	Jun	Jul	Aug	Sep	Oct	Nov	Dec
2001	40												40
2002	466	46	47	47	47	46	43	30	33	34	30	32	31
2003	366	29	23	40	40	31	23	31	27	30	26	29	37
2004	358	23	31	37	34	43	26	23	23	34	28	26	30
2005	425	18	19	33	36	30	35	32	17	36	28	36	105
2006	992	88	67	94	97	66	69	63	54	79	105	102	108
2007	1,152	97	93	113	105	98	63	63	91	101	135	103	90
2008	1,760	137	121	150	183	167	124	133	93	124	166	164	198
2009	2,862	220	218	275	270	237	193	169	224	159	305	278	314
2010	3,406	235	190	367	362	284	283	246	258	288	294	345	254
2011	3,720	279	320	328	357	356	358	234	205	218	355	386	324
2012	5,195	416	327	388	358	425	466	355	327	321	461	665	686
2013	9,432	727	687	789	886	869	817	634	597	864	993	845	724
2014	10,844	1,039	765	1,119	1,140	795	919	769	733	845	815	1,075	830
2015	10,999	922	824	828	997	917	812	737	697	989	879	1,152	1,245
2016	14,112	1,061	1,303	1,423	1,300	1,103	984	1,076	884	1,138	1,396	1,222	1,222
2017	18,598	1,407	1,426	1,889	1,953	1,659	1,509	1,194	921	1,552	1,797	1,580	1,711
2018	18,907	1,761	1,549	1,943	1,822	1,450	1,872	914	1,372	1,560	1,402	1,467	1,795
2019	21,126	1,597	1,416	1,870	1,952	1,566	1,473	1,652	1,339	2,205	2,087	2,007	1,962
2020	23,964	1,876	1,921	1,959	2,057	1,887	2,574	1,592	1,710	1,817	2,050	2,412	2,109
2021	25,622	2,145	1,417	2,665	2,492	2,323	1,752	1,534	2,133	2,165	2,135	2,203	2,658
2022	29,477	2,605	2,627	3,022	3,019	2,778	2,346	1,991	1,766	2,128	1,995	2,775	2,425
2023	7,642	2,355	2,475	2,812									

Kansas wind generation in 2011	Kansas wind generation in 2017
Kansas wind generation in 2013

== See also ==
- Solar power in Kansas
- Wind power in the United States
- List of wind farms in the United States
- List of HVDC projects
