= Smoky Hills Wind Farm =

Wind farm in Kansas, United States

Coordinates: 38.972155°N 98.150225°W

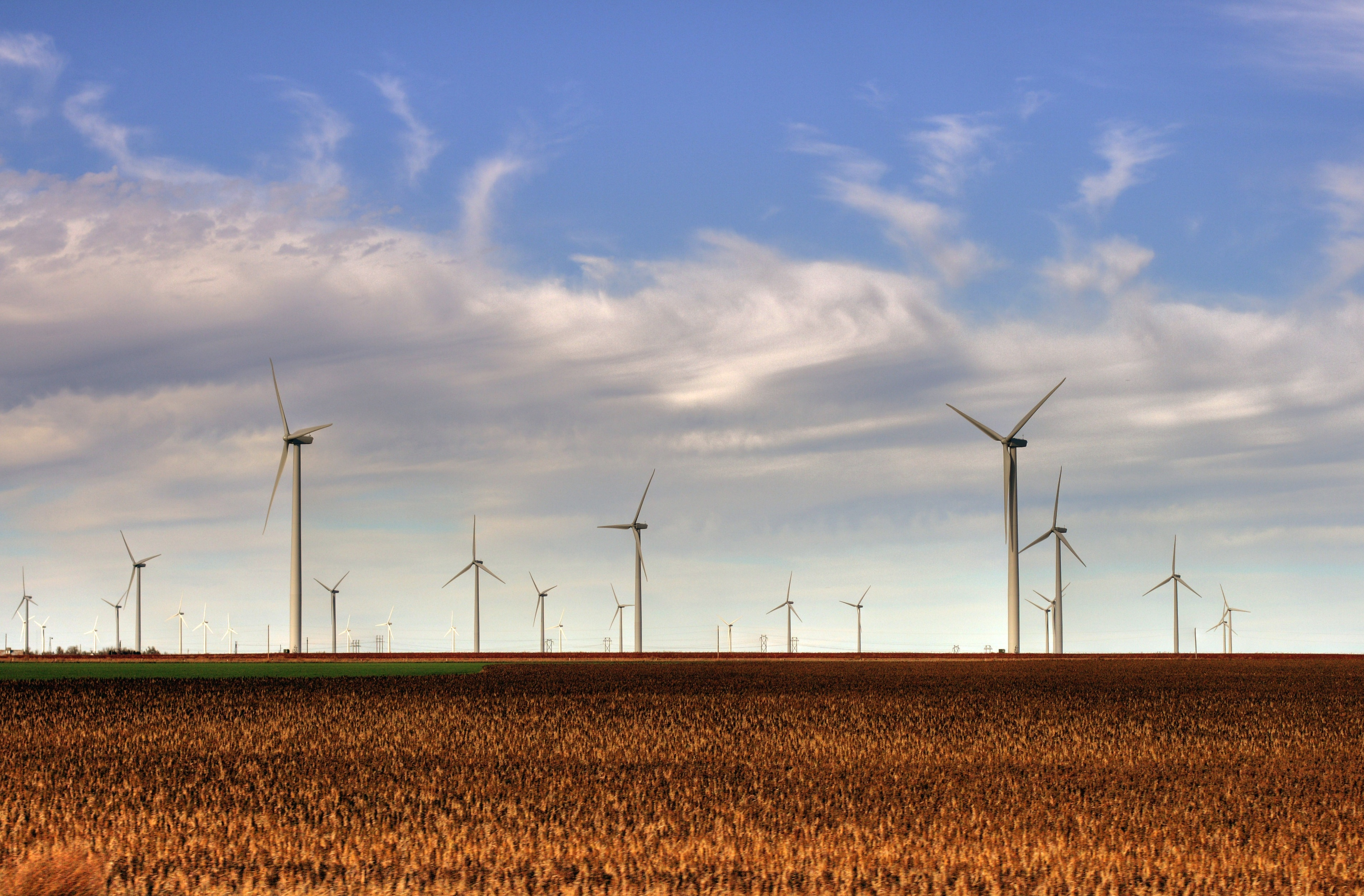
The Smoky Hills Wind Farm as seen from Interstate 70

The Smoky Hills Wind Farm (Phase I & Phase II) is a 250 megawatt (MW) wind farm in Lincoln and Ellsworth Counties, 140 miles west of Topeka in Kansas, north of Ellsworth. The farm is operated by Enel Green Power. Highway K-14 and Interstate 70 pass through parts of the wind farm, with clear views of many of the wind turbines. Phase I of the project uses 56 Vestas V80 1.8 MW wind turbines, produces enough electricity to power some 37,000 average Kansas homes annually, and opened in February 2008. Beginning November 2008, phase II was constructed with 99 GE 1.5 MW wind turbines for an additional 148.5 MW, to bring the total nameplate capacity to 249.3 MW. Phase II was completed and began commercial operation in December 2008.

Smoky Hills Wind Farm from Interstate 70

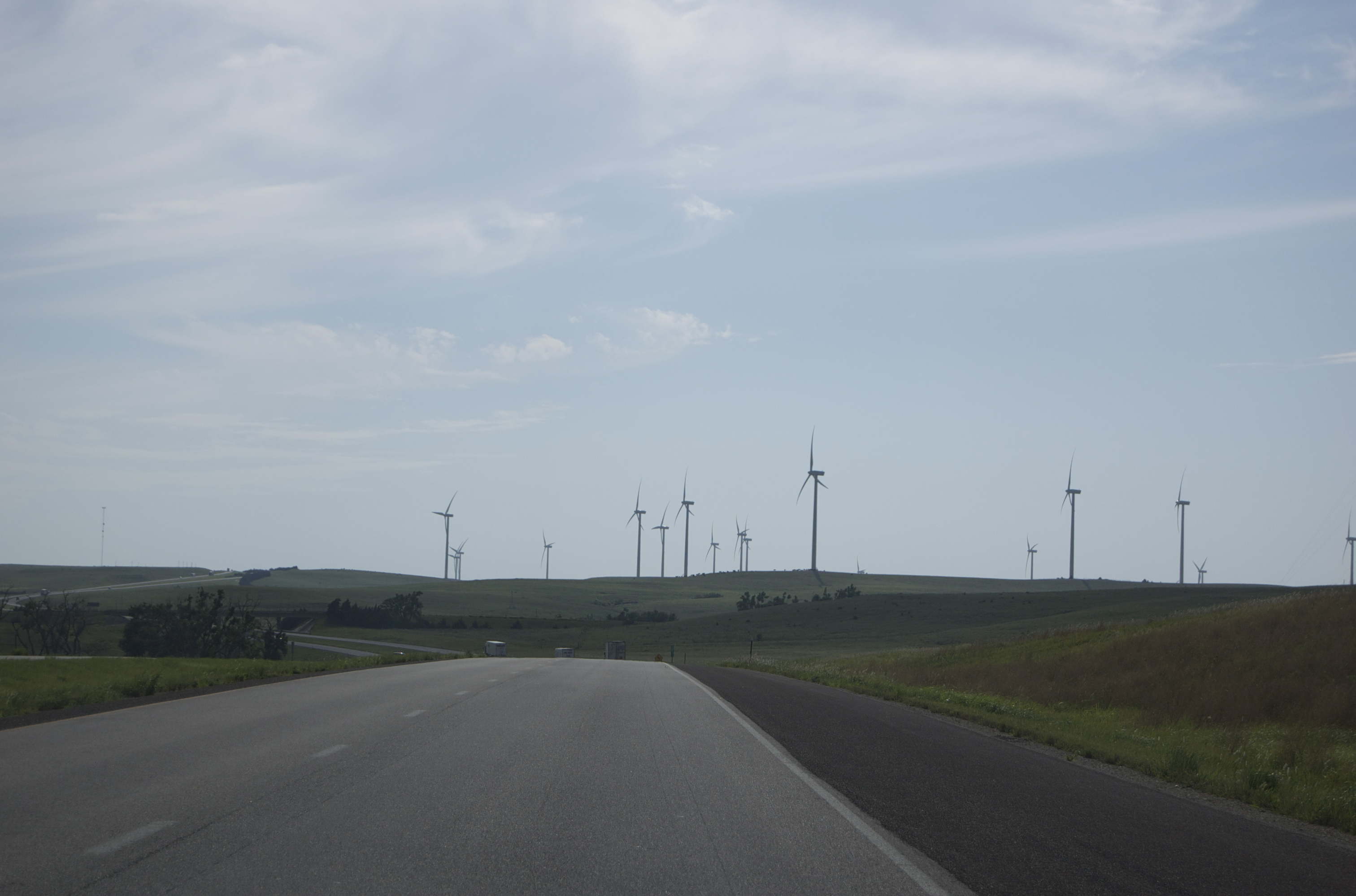

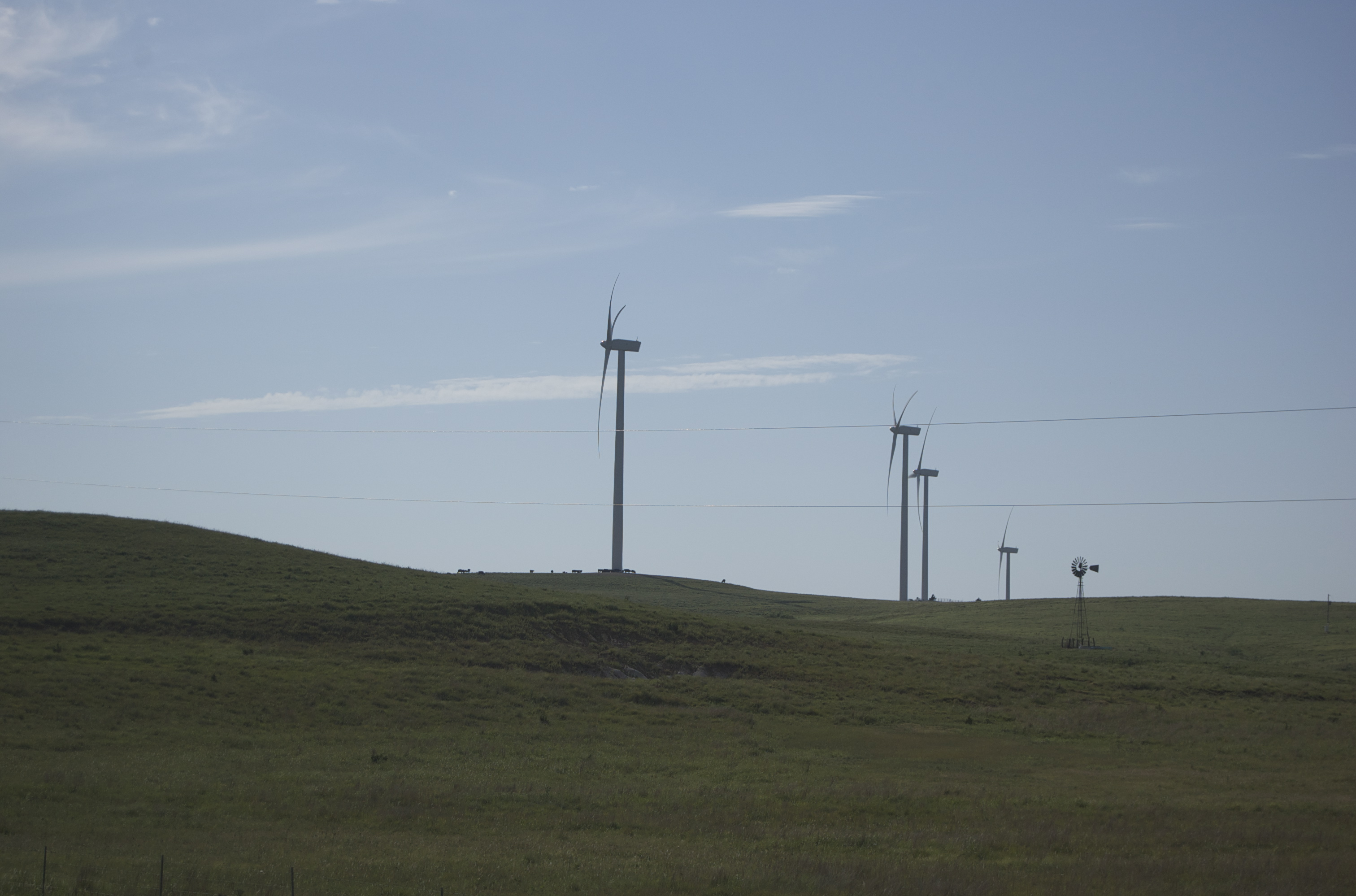

== See also ==
- Elk River Wind Project
